= Evangeline Marrs Whipple =

American philanthropist and writer

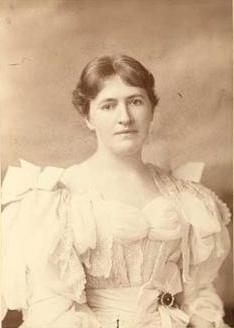
- Born: Evangeline Elizabeth Thurston Marrs; January 15, 1855, or 1857; Wayland, Massachusetts, U.S.
- Died: September 1, 1930 (aged 73 or 75); London, England
- Known for: Philanthropy
- Spouses: Michael Hodge Simpson (m. 1882; died 1884) Henry Benjamin Whipple (m. 1896; died 1901)
- Partner: Rose Cleveland

Evangeline Simpson Whipple (née Marrs; January 15, 1855/1857 – September 1, 1930) was an American philanthropist and author, who was known for her humanitarian activities as a member of the American Red Cross in Europe during the First World War.

== Early life ==
Evangeline Elizabeth Thurston Marrs was born in Wayland, Massachusetts, the only daughter born to Jane Van Poelien Marrs (1832–1906), an immigrant from England, and Dana Francis Marrs (b. 1826), (Note: According to her 1896 wedding announcement to Bishop Whipple, she was the daughter of the late Dr. Francis Marrs.) a machinist and farmer from Ireland. Her older brother was photographer Kingsmill Marrs, who married Laura Norcross (a daughter of mayor Otis Norcross).

== Marriages ==
=== First marriage ===
In 1882, aged 27, according to one source, Evangeline was first married to Michael Hodge Simpson (1809–1884), a wealthy cotton manufacturer from Saxonville, Massachusetts, who was 48 years her senior. As a wedding present, he gave her $1 million (equivalent to $33,362,069 in 2025) in bonds. While the newlyweds went on their honeymoon in Europe, Simpson commissioned a $150,000 (equivalent to $5,004,310 in 2025) mansion to be built in Wayland, overlooking Dudley Pond. Local residents responded badly to their age difference, however, and the couple did not end up spending much time in the mansion. Simpson died of heart failure in 1884 and left an estate of $10–12 million to Evangeline.

=== Second marriage ===
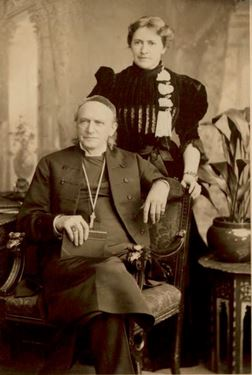
Evangeline, and her second husband, Bishop Whipple, in the late 1890s

As a wealthy widow, Evangeline later began a relationship with Rose Cleveland, the sister of President Grover Cleveland. Rose had served as her brother's White House hostess (First Lady of the United States) from 1885 to 1886 because he was not married when he took office. The relationship between the women continued until Evangeline met Bishop Henry Benjamin Whipple in Florida while she was on vacation. Whipple was the first bishop of Minnesota, known for advocating for Native American rights. He maintained a winter home in Florida, and founded a church in Maitland, Florida. Evangeline was an "intimate friend" of Whipple's first wife Cornelia Wright Whipple, a daughter of Benjamin Wright of Jefferson County, whom he married in 1842 and who died in 1890 from injuries sustained in a railroad accident. Bishop Whipple married Evangeline in 1896, moved to Minnesota, and changed her legal family name to Whipple. Henry Whipple was 36 years her senior.

She then began a period of humanitarianism and philanthropy, working with her husband, a missionary for The Episcopal Church. She greatly expanded the Cathedral of Our Merciful Saviour, provided the fund for the construction of the St. Mary's School for Girls, also in Faribault, and worked to improve education provided to women. Henry Whipple died in 1901. In his honor, Evangeline commissioned several memorials to him, including the bell tower for the Cathedral of Our Merciful Saviour. She stayed in Minnesota following his death and continued supporting the community. In 1902, she traveled to Italy with Rose Cleveland. They corresponded when apart.

== Italy ==
In 1910, Evangeline Whipple left Minnesota for Italy, traveling with Cleveland, to be with her terminally ill brother Kingsmill Marrs, and never returned to the United States. Whipple moved to Bagni di Lucca and the two women spent the next eight years doing philanthropic and civic work, such as building an orphanage. In recognition of their contribution to the city, Bagni di Lucca named a street after Whipple. Whipple often socialized with her friends such as Nelly Erichsen in the three houses that she owned.

After the onset of the Great War, both Whipple and Cleveland volunteered for the Red Cross in Italy, in addition to their friend Erichsen. During the war, Whipple also worked to address the Spanish flu pandemic and transport people displaced due to the war to Bagni di Lucca by providing humanitarian aid. Erichsen contracted Spanish influenza during the 1918 flu pandemic, and died shortly after the end of the war. Cleveland died several days later from the flu after nursing for Erichsen.

Whipple continued to travel around Europe and advocate for women's issues around the continent. In 1928, A Famous Corner of Tuscany written by her was published. It was dedicated to Cleveland.

== Death and legacy ==
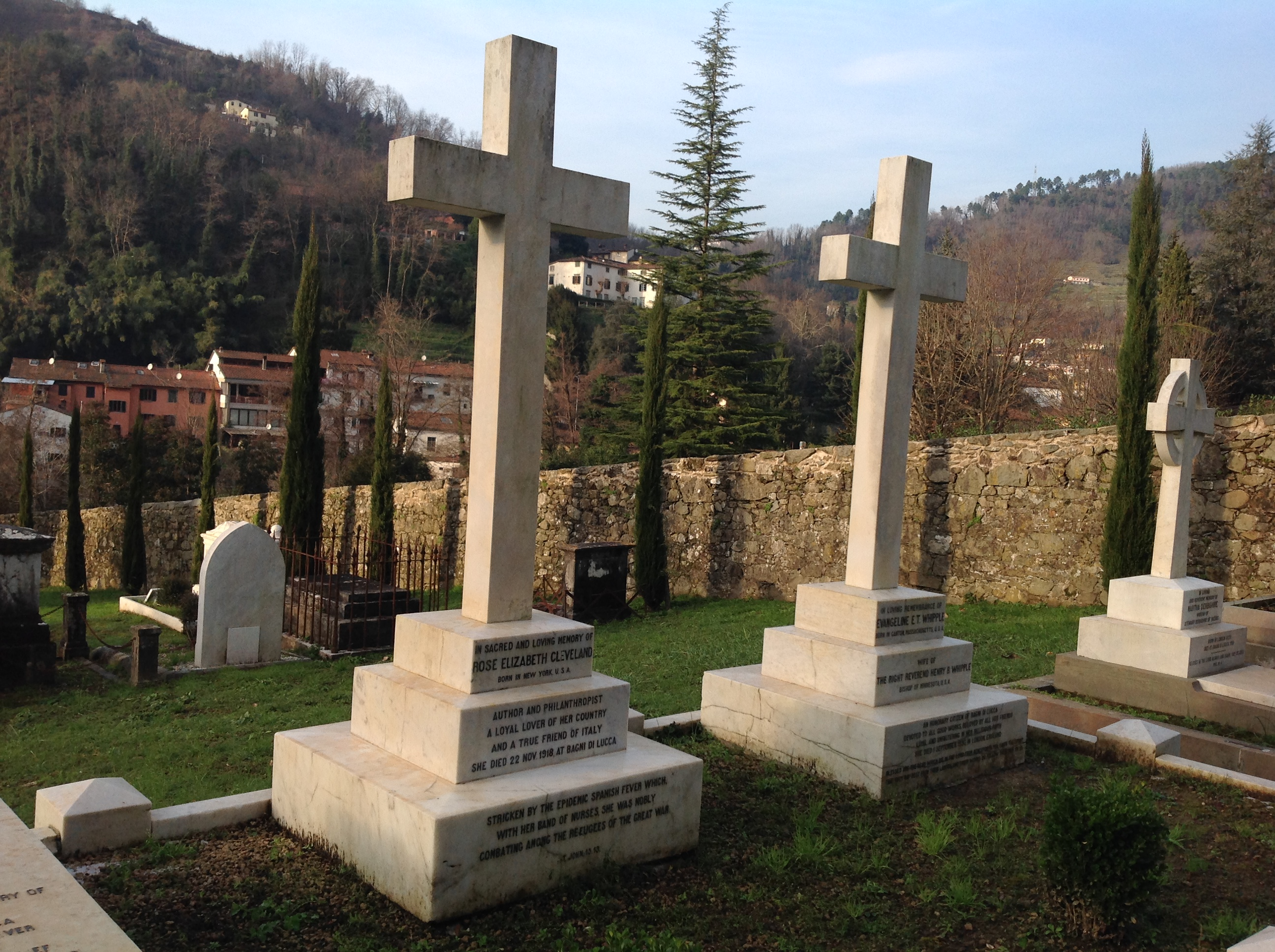
Whipple's and Cleveland's monuments, English Cemetery, Bagni di Lucca, Italy

In 1930, Whipple fell ill while traveling in London, and died shortly thereafter. She was buried alongside Rose Cleveland in the English Cemetery section in Bagni di Lucca. In her will, she left millions of dollars to schools, churches, people, and Native American programs in Minnesota that she worked with. It is believed that she gave a total of what would have been $53 million in 2013 to the St. Mary's School for Girls, now called Shattuck-Saint Mary's.

Archived at the Minnesota Historical Society is the correspondence, described as love letters, between Whipple and Cleveland. It is part of the Whipple–Scandrett collection.

Her influence on the Faribault, Minnesota area was portrayed in the Rice County Historical Society's version of A Night at the Museum that features historical people in a 2013 event. The historical society received a grant from the Minnesota Historical Society in the amount of $9,800 to produce archives of Whipple's life. Tilly Laskey, who traveled to Tuscany to research Whipple's life and is considered the "premier historian" on her legacy, was expected to be commissioned to work on the project called "Hidden in Plain Sight: Recovering Evangeline Marrs Whipple's Minnesota Story Through Archival Research".
