= Cochituate, Massachusetts =

- Census-designated place
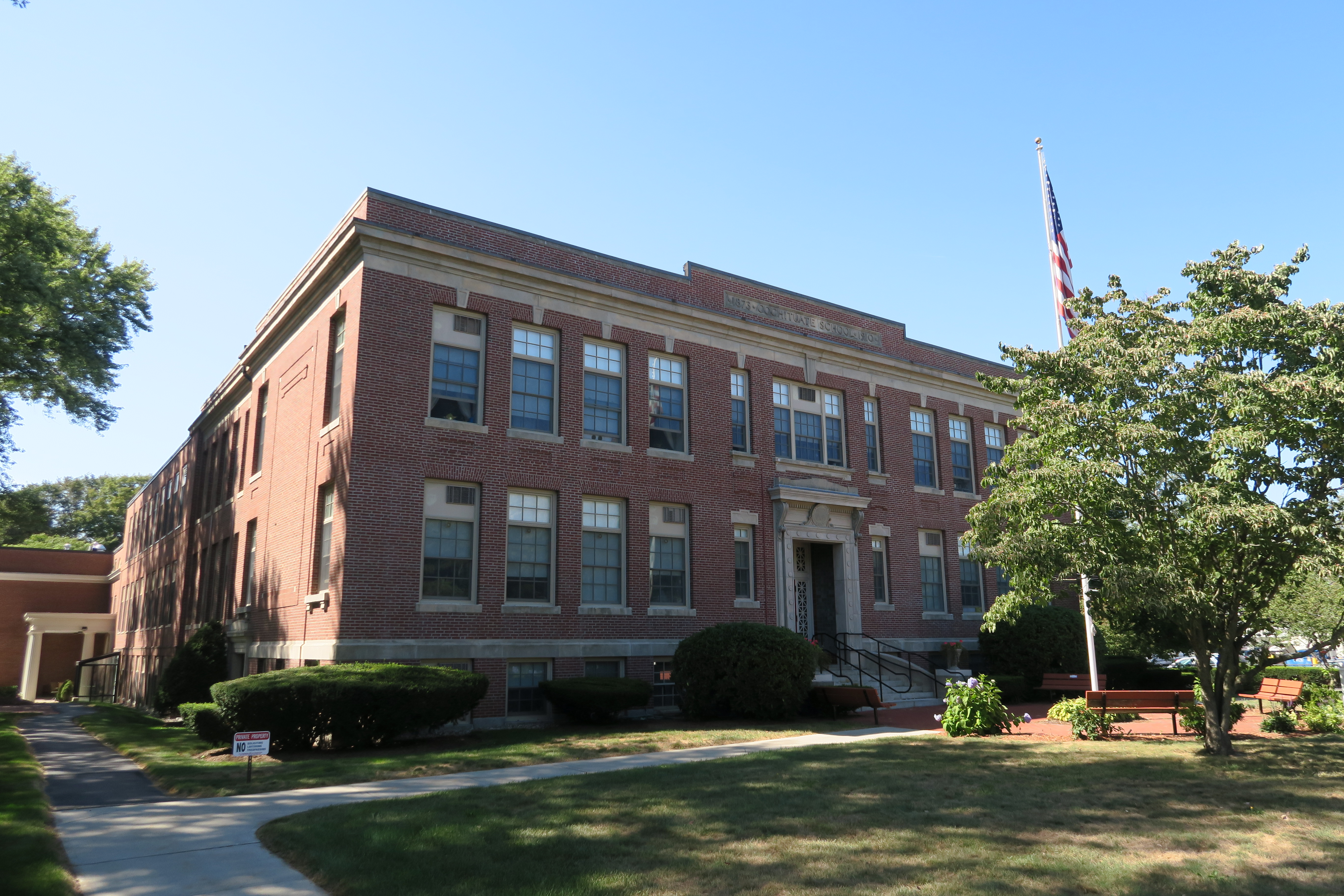
- Cochituate School

- Location in Middlesex County in Massachusetts
- Coordinates: 42°19′40″N 71°21′37″W
- Country: United States
- State: Massachusetts
- County: Middlesex
- Town: Wayland

Area
  - Total: 4.17 sq mi (10.79 km^{2})
  - Land: 3.81 sq mi (9.86 km^{2})
  - Water: 0.36 sq mi (0.92 km^{2})
- Elevation: 174 ft (53 m)

Population (2020)
  - Total: 6,927
  - Density: 1,818.6/sq mi (702.18/km^{2})
- Time zone: UTC-5 (Eastern (EST))
  - Summer (DST): UTC-4 (EDT)
- ZIP code: 01778 (Wayland)
- Area code: 508
- FIPS code: 25-14570
- GNIS feature ID: 0611909

Cochituate (/koʊˈtʃɪtʃuɪt/; koh-CHIT-choo-it) is a census-designated place (CDP) in the town of Wayland in Middlesex County, Massachusetts, United States. The population was 6,927 at the 2020 census, out of 13,943 in the entire town of Wayland.

== Geography ==
Cochituate is located in southwestern Middlesex County at 42°19′40″N 71°21′37″W, in the southern part of the town of Wayland. The southern border of the community is the Natick town line, except at Cochituate's southeastern corner, which extends into the northeastern corner of Natick. Cochituate is bordered to the west by the city of Framingham.

Massachusetts Route 27 passes through Cochituate as its Main Street, leading north 3 miles (5 km) to Wayland Center and south the same distance to Natick Center. Massachusetts Route 30 (Commonwealth Road) passes through the southern part of Cochituate, leading east 9 miles (14 km) to Newton and west 4 miles (6 km) to the center of Framingham. Interstate 90, the Massachusetts Turnpike crosses the southern part of Cochituate in two places; the closest access is Exit 117, 1 mile (1.6 km) to the west in Framingham.

According to the United States Census Bureau, the Cochituate CDP has a total area of 4.17 square miles (10.80 km^{2}), of which 3.81 square miles (9.87 km^{2}) are land and 0.36 square miles (0.93 km^{2}), or 8.57%, are water. It is home to Lake Cochituate and Dudley Pond. Both are used by residents year round; in the summer for boating and fishing, and in the winter for ice fishing. There is a beach where Waylanders can pay for a membership. Lake Cochituate, which consists of four ponds connected by shallow, narrow waterways, is located in the towns of Natick, Framingham, and Wayland, 16 miles (26 km) west of Boston. Lake Cochituate lies in the Sudbury River Basin; Cochituate means "swift river" in the Algonquin language (Wilbur, 1978) and refers to Cochituate Brook (Schaller and Prescott, 1998), which connects the lake to the Sudbury River. The Sudbury River, via the Concord River, is part of the larger Merrimack River watershed.

== Demographics ==
Historical population
Census	Pop.	Note	%±
1980	6,126		—
1990	6,046		−1.3%
2000	6,768		11.9%
2010	6,569		−2.9%
2020	6,927		5.4%
U.S. Decennial Census

=== 2020 census ===
As of the 2020 census, Cochituate had a population of 6,927. The median age was 44.4 years. 24.4% of residents were under the age of 18 and 19.9% of residents were 65 years of age or older. For every 100 females there were 93.9 males, and for every 100 females age 18 and over there were 90.6 males age 18 and over.

100.0% of residents lived in urban areas, while 0.0% lived in rural areas.

There were 2,503 households in Cochituate, of which 38.4% had children under the age of 18 living in them. Of all households, 66.2% were married-couple households, 10.1% were households with a male householder and no spouse or partner present, and 20.7% were households with a female householder and no spouse or partner present. About 20.5% of all households were made up of individuals and 12.7% had someone living alone who was 65 years of age or older.

There were 2,617 housing units, of which 4.4% were vacant. The homeowner vacancy rate was 0.5% and the rental vacancy rate was 5.0%.

Racial composition as of the 2020 census
Race	Number	Percent
White	5,253	75.8%
Black or African American	90	1.3%
American Indian and Alaska Native	2	0.0%
Asian	1,044	15.1%
Native Hawaiian and Other Pacific Islander	0	0.0%
Some other race	86	1.2%
Two or more races	452	6.5%
Hispanic or Latino (of any race)	262	3.8%

=== 2000 census ===
As of the 2000 census, there were 6,768 people, 2,449 households, and 1,851 families residing in the CDP. The population density was 682.3 people/km^{2} (1,767 people/mi^{2}). There were 2,516 housing units at an average density of 253.6 units/km^{2} (657 units/mi^{2}). The racial makeup of the CDP was 90.90% White, 0.93% Black or African American, 0.09% Native American, 6.24% Asian, 0.06% Pacific Islander, 0.24% from other races, and 1.55% from two or more races. Hispanic or Latino of any race were 1.00% of the population.

There were 2,449 households, out of which 38.5% had children under the age of 18 living with them, 64.9% were married couples living together, 8.5% had a female householder with no husband present, and 24.4% were non-families. 19.7% of all households were made up of individuals, and 9.0% had someone living alone who was 65 years of age or older. The average household size was 2.70 and the average family size was 3.14.

In the CDP, the population was spread out, with 27.2% under the age of 18, 3.5% from 18 to 24, 25.5% from 25 to 44, 27.8% from 45 to 64, and 16.0% who were 65 years of age or older. The median age was 42 years. For every 100 females, there were 91.3 males. For every 100 females age 18 and over, there were 85.8 males.

The median income for a household in the CDP was $89,012, and the median income for a family was $101,362. Males had a median income of $71,500 versus $50,223 for females. The per capita income for the CDP was $42,752. About 1.8% of families and 2.2% of the population were below the poverty line, including 1.1% of those under age 18 and 4.3% of those age 65 or over.
