= Mary Arthur McElroy =

First Lady of the United States from 1881 to 1885

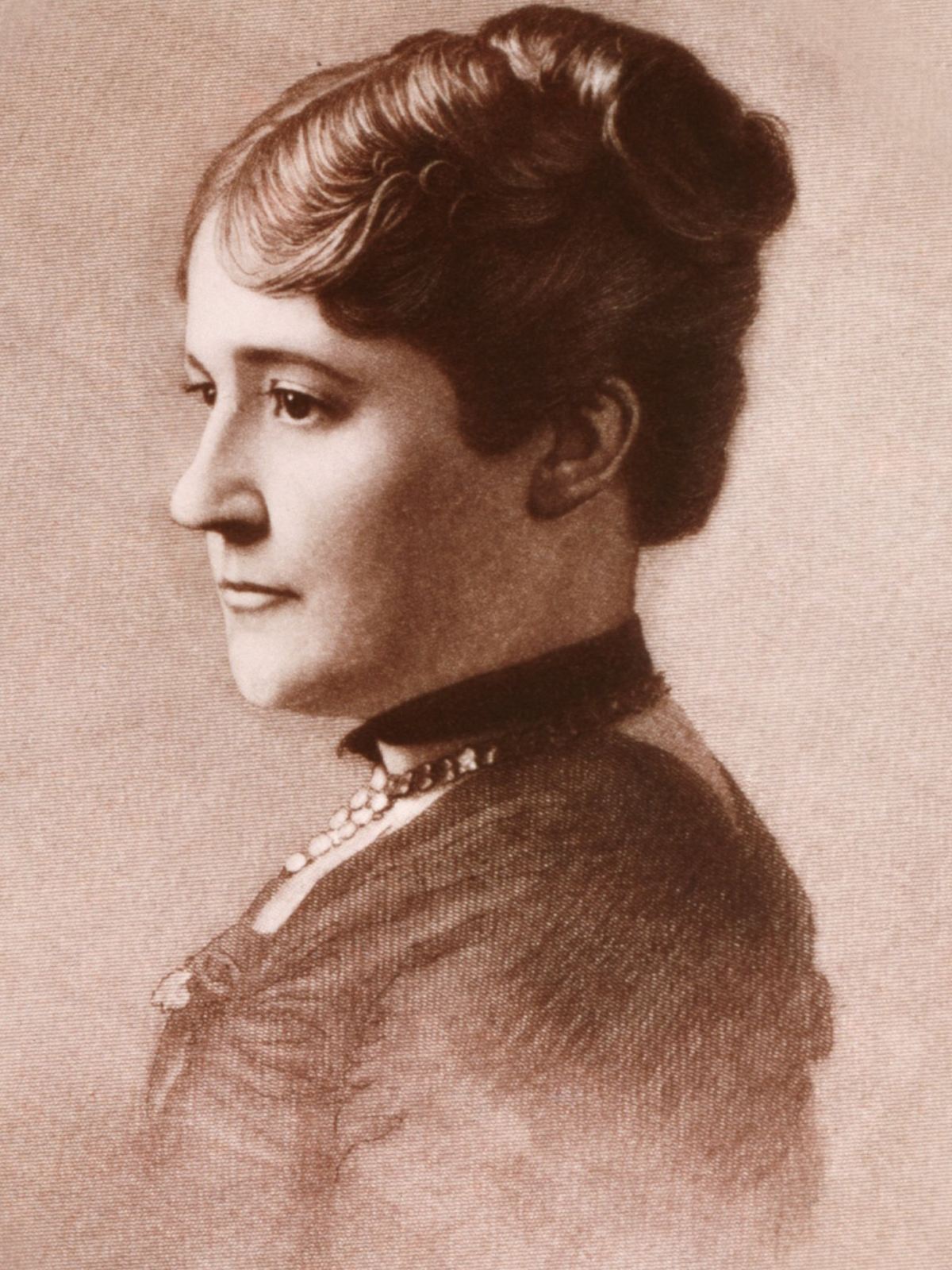
- 1885 portrait

First Lady of the United States
- In role September 19, 1881 – March 4, 1885
- President: Chester A. Arthur
- Preceded by: Lucretia Garfield
- Succeeded by: Rose Cleveland (acting)

Personal details
- Born: Mary Arthur; July 5, 1841 Greenwich, New York, U.S.
- Died: January 8, 1917 (aged 75) Albany, New York, U.S.
- Spouse: John Edward McElroy (m. 1861; died 1915)
- Children: 4
- Parent: William Arthur (father)
- Education: Emma Willard School
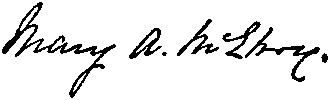
- Signature

Mary McElroy (née Arthur; July 5, 1841 – January 8, 1917) was an American woman known as being the sister of the 21st president of the United States, Chester A. Arthur, for whom she served as a hostess (acting as the first lady) for his administration (1881–1885). She assumed the role because Arthur's wife, Ellen, had died nearly two years earlier.

McElroy was born in New York and attended the progressive Emma Willard School. She married insurance salesman John Edward McElroy and worked for some time as a teacher. When her brother Chester A. Arthur became president, she lived in the White House during winter months to host social events and care for her niece. As acting first lady, McElroy ended the tradition of suspending social events during Lent, and she held large weekly receptions. She was a popular hostess, and contemporary Washington social life celebrated her for her lively receptions.

When her tenure as hostess ended, McElroy returned to her family in Albany, New York, and she later worked in Ireland to preserve the Arthur family homestead. She handled her brother's affairs during his illness and after his death, taking responsibility for his funeral and his presidential legacy. McElroy died in Albany in 1917. She is one of the most obscure first ladies, and relatively little scholarly research about her life exists.

== Early life ==
Mary Arthur was born in Greenwich, New York, the last of nine children born to William and Malvina S. Arthur. Arthur's mother, Malvina Stone, was born in Vermont, the daughter of George Washington Stone and Judith Stevens. Malvina's family was primarily of English and Welsh descent, and her grandfather, Uriah Stone, fought in the Continental Army during the American Revolution. Her father, William Arthur, was born in Dreen, Cullybackey, County Antrim, Ireland; he graduated from college in Belfast and emigrated to Canada in 1819 or 1820. Her mother met her father while William Arthur was teaching at a school in Dunham, Quebec, just over the border from her native Vermont.

McElroy attended the Emma Willard School Seminary in Troy, New York, intending to become a teacher. This school offered an education equivalent to that found in men's schools; she was educated in history, geography, science, and French. At one point, McElroy taught at a private school in Edgecombe County, North Carolina. Little else is known about her career before her work in the White House. On June 13, 1861, she married John Edward McElroy (1833–1915), the son of William McElroy and Jane Mullen. John McElroy was a reverend and an insurance salesman who was the president of the Albany Insurance Company. They lived in Albany, New York, and had four children: May (1862–?), William (1864–1892), Jessie (1867–1934), and Charles (1873–1947). She also assisted in raising the children of her brother Chester A. Arthur when his wife Nell Arthur died in 1880. She was close to Arthur's daughter Nellie, encouraging her to pursue music in honor of her mother.

== Acting First Lady of the United States ==
Her brother Chester was elected vice president in 1880, and he became president after the death of President James A. Garfield in 1881. In January 1883, President Arthur asked her to serve as White House hostess. As Arthur was a widower, there had been no first lady in the White House for the first year of his presidency. Her close relationship with Arthur's daughter reaffirmed his decision to choose her as White House hostess. McElroy accepted the position, though she faced some reluctance, as she was a naturally shy person, and it would require her to leave her family in Albany. McElroy quickly learned the responsibilities of White House hostess, and she described herself when starting as "absolutely unfamiliar with the customs and formalities".

McElroy began her role as acting first lady on January 24 when she participated in a diplomatic corps dinner. McElroy first hosted a reception of her own on January 27 and would host further receptions on Saturdays thereafter. As the nation was mourning President Garfield, Washington's social life was not as active as it would have been. When the winter social season ended in March, a farewell dinner was held in her honor, and she returned to Albany. McElroy returned to the White House on January 1, 1884, to assist in New Year's Day celebrations. McElroy then broke with the tradition of suspending social events during Lent, and she held weekly open-house receptions in the spring during which a hostess would be assigned to each room, culminating in an elaborate luncheon in the family quarters. McElroy also established the tradition of serving tea after White House receptions.

Arthur never gave McElroy formal recognition as a first lady out of respect for his late wife. Despite this, she proved to be a popular and competent hostess. Future First Ladies used the social function procedures she and her brother developed for decades. Her responsibilities typically involved hosting more formal events, as Arthur would host informal dinners himself if families were not attending. McElroy was noted for her hospitality while hosting, using a more personal style with guests. Her oldest daughter May and Arthur's daughter Nell often assisted with these duties; the presence of children "did away with any stiffness" while she was working. When decorating the White House, she often incorporated gas light and heavy use of plants.

McElroy presided over many events and honored former First Ladies Julia Tyler and Harriet Lane by asking them to help her receive guests at the White House. McElroy also held a private luncheon for former first lady Julia Grant. As McElroy was not the president's wife, McElroy had more flexibility regarding social customs and would attend social events in homes other than the White House. McElroy also declined to take up any causes or charity work as many first ladies had done. However, McElroy retained several benefits of her status as White House hostess, including use of the president's box at the theater, transport on U.S. Navy ships, and access to the president's retreat. While serving as White House hostess, supporters of the temperance movement would contact her to enforce a ban on alcohol in the White House, but McElroy declined to take such action.

Her final reception took place on February 28, 1885, five days before the end of the Arthur administration: 3,000 people attended (including Adolphus Greely), and 48 daughters of officials and the social elite assisted her. During the presidential transition period, McElroy befriended her successor Rose Cleveland, who would also be the sister of an unmarried president. They also had in common their hometown of Albany. On her final day as White House hostess, McElroy held a luncheon for Cleveland.

== Later life and death ==
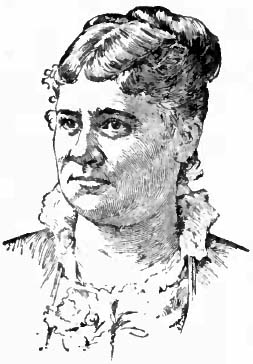
Sketch of McElroy (1914)

When Arthur left the White House, McElroy stayed with him in Washington for several weeks. Before McElroy left to return for Albany, Senator George H. Pendleton and his wife held a farewell reception in her honor. In 1886, McElroy traveled to Ireland to meet family and helped preserve the family homestead as a historic site. In February 1886, Arthur became critically ill, and McElroy left Albany to be with him. After his death later that year, McElroy arranged his funeral and became the legal guardian of his daughter. McElroy also took responsibility for his legacy, organizing his presidential papers and unveiling his statue in Madison Square. In 1889, First Lady Frances Cleveland invited McElroy to a White House luncheon as a guest of honor. McElroy and her husband were supportive of civil rights for African Americans and hosted Booker T. Washington at their home in Albany in June 1900. McElroy opposed the women's suffrage movement, and was a member of the Albany Association Opposed to Women's Suffrage. McElroy died on January 8, 1917, at the age of 75 in Albany and was buried in Albany Rural Cemetery.

== Legacy ==
McElroy has not been the focus of significant historical research. This is partly because of her limited time as a White House hostess and partly because of the relatively little scholarly focus on her brother's presidency. Historians laud her for her quick adaptation to White House life and her talent as a hostess.

In 1982, the Siena College Research Institute asked historians to assess American first ladies; it included McElroy and several other "acting" first ladies. The first ladies survey, which has been conducted periodically since, ranks first ladies according to a cumulative score on the independent criteria of their background, value to the country, intelligence, courage, accomplishments, integrity, leadership, being their own women, public image, and value to the president. In the 1982 survey, out of 42 first ladies and "acting" first ladies, McElroy was the 25th most highly regarded among historians. Acting first ladies such as McElroy have been excluded from subsequent iterations of this survey.

== See also ==
- Bibliography of United States presidential spouses and first ladies

Honorary titles
| Preceded by Lucretia Garfield | First Lady of the United States; Acting; 1881–1885 | Succeeded by Rose Cleveland; Acting |
