= William Arthur (clergyman) =

Irish-born American cleric, father of US President Chester Arthur

The Reverend William Arthur
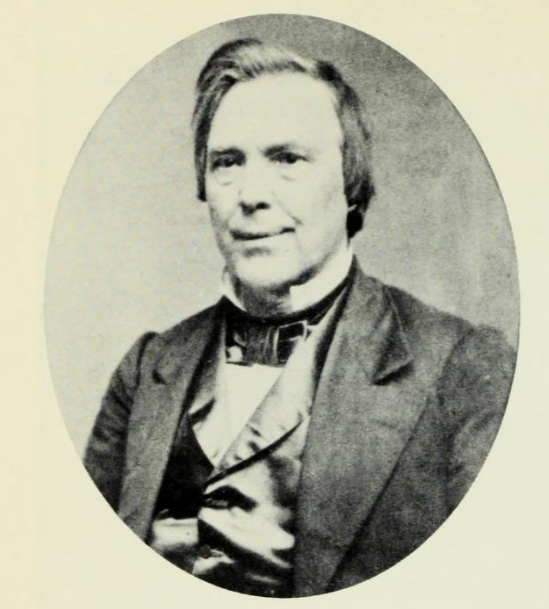
- Born: December 5, 1796; Ballymena, County Antrim, Kingdom of Ireland
- Died: October 27, 1875 (aged 78); Newtonville, New York, United States
- Occupation(s): Author, Baptist minister, abolitionist
- Spouse: Malvina Stone (m. 1821; died 1869)
- Children: 8, including Chester A. and Mary

William Arthur (December 5, 1796 – October 27, 1875) was an Irish-born Baptist minister and abolitionist. He was the father of the twenty-first president of the United States, Chester A. Arthur.

== Life ==
William Arthur was born on 5 December 1796 in Ballymena Borough, County Antrim. His parents names were Alan Arthur and Eliza MacHerg. Alan Arthur was the namesake for his grandson's middle name.

He is widely reported to have been raised at Arthur Cottage in Cullybackey. In 1963 the building was bought by the Government of Northern Ireland, whose Finance Minister Terence O'Neill intended to donate the cottage to the National Trust. However the Trust declined the offer, because the link with William Arthur had not been proven. The building later became a museum in the care of Ballymena Borough Council. In 2023, the website of the successor Mid and East Antrim Borough Council was asserting without reservation that Arthur Cottage "is the ancestral home of Chester Alan Arthur, the 21st President of the United States of America".

William Arthur graduated from Belfast College, came to the United States, studied law for a short time, and was then called to the Baptist ministry. After preaching in Vermont and western New York, he was settled as pastor of the Calvary Baptist church of Albany, New York, where he remained from 1855 to 1863. He later moved to Schenectady, where he published a magazine called The Antiquarian and General Review, to whose pages he contributed much curious learning on a variety of topics. He published an Etymological Dictionary of Family and Christian Names (New York, 1857), which was favorably received.

During the last ten years of his life he lived in retirement, preaching occasionally, and giving much time to literary pursuits. Arthur was noted for his attainments in the classics and in history. William Arthur died on 27 October 1875 in Newtonville, New York.

His son, Chester A. Arthur would serve as President of the United States.
