= Newtonville School =

- U.S. National Register of Historic Places
- Location within New York Location within the United States
- Location: 543 Loudon Rd., Newtonville, New York
- Coordinates: 42°43′16″N 73°45′19″W
- Area: less than one acre
- Built: 1925
- Architectural style: Colonial Revival
- NRHP reference No.: 00001155
- Added to NRHP: September 22, 2000

Newtonville School is a historic school building located at Newtonville in Albany County, New York. It was built in 1925 and consists of a one-story, gable-roofed brick main block with a one-story, rectangular hipped roof wing. It is in the Colonial Revival style and features a wood portico with two slender, fluted Doric order columns. Atop the roof is an octagonal wood cupola with a copper roof. The school was converted to administrative use in 1954.

It was listed on the National Register of Historic Places in 2000.
