= Casparus F. Pruyn House =

Historic house in New York, United States

- U.S. National Register of Historic Places
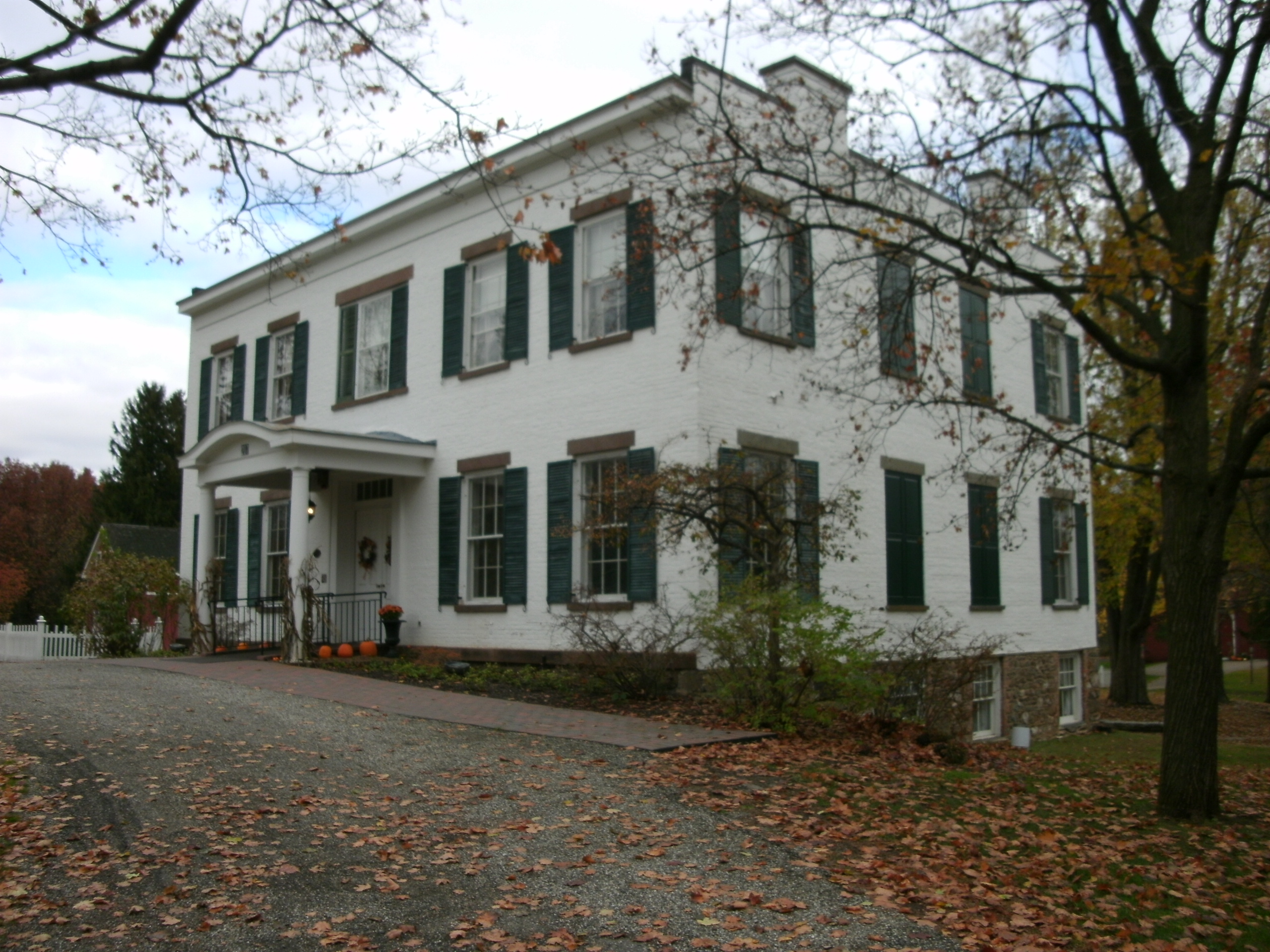
- Casparus F. Pruyn House, November 2010

- Location within New York Location within the United States
- Location: 207 Old Niskayuna Rd., Newtonville, New York
- Coordinates: 42°43′55″N 73°46′43″W
- Area: 5 acres (2.0 ha)
- Architectural style: Greek Revival, Federal
- MPS: Colonie Town MRA
- NRHP reference No.: 85002744
- Added to NRHP: October 3, 1985

Casparus F. Pruyn House is a historic home located in the hamlet of Newtonville within the town of Colonie in Albany County, New York. It is a two-story, rectangular five bay wide, center entrance dwelling in a late Federal and early Greek Revival style. It was built between 1824 and 1836. Pruyn was rent collection agent for Stephen Van Rensselaer and, after Stephen's death, William Van Rensselaer who had inherited the "East Manor" in Rensselaer County. From 1839 to 1844 Pruyn resided at the Patroon Agent's House and Office at Rensselaer and was a central figure in the Anti-Rent War at Rensselaerswyck. Also on the property are a contributing carriage house, privy, and smoke house. It is open to the public as the historical and cultural arts center for the Town of Colonie. The Verdoy Schoolhouse was moved to the grounds in 1996.

It was listed on the National Register of Historic Places in 1985.
