= Rose Cleveland =

First Lady of the United States from 1885 to 1886

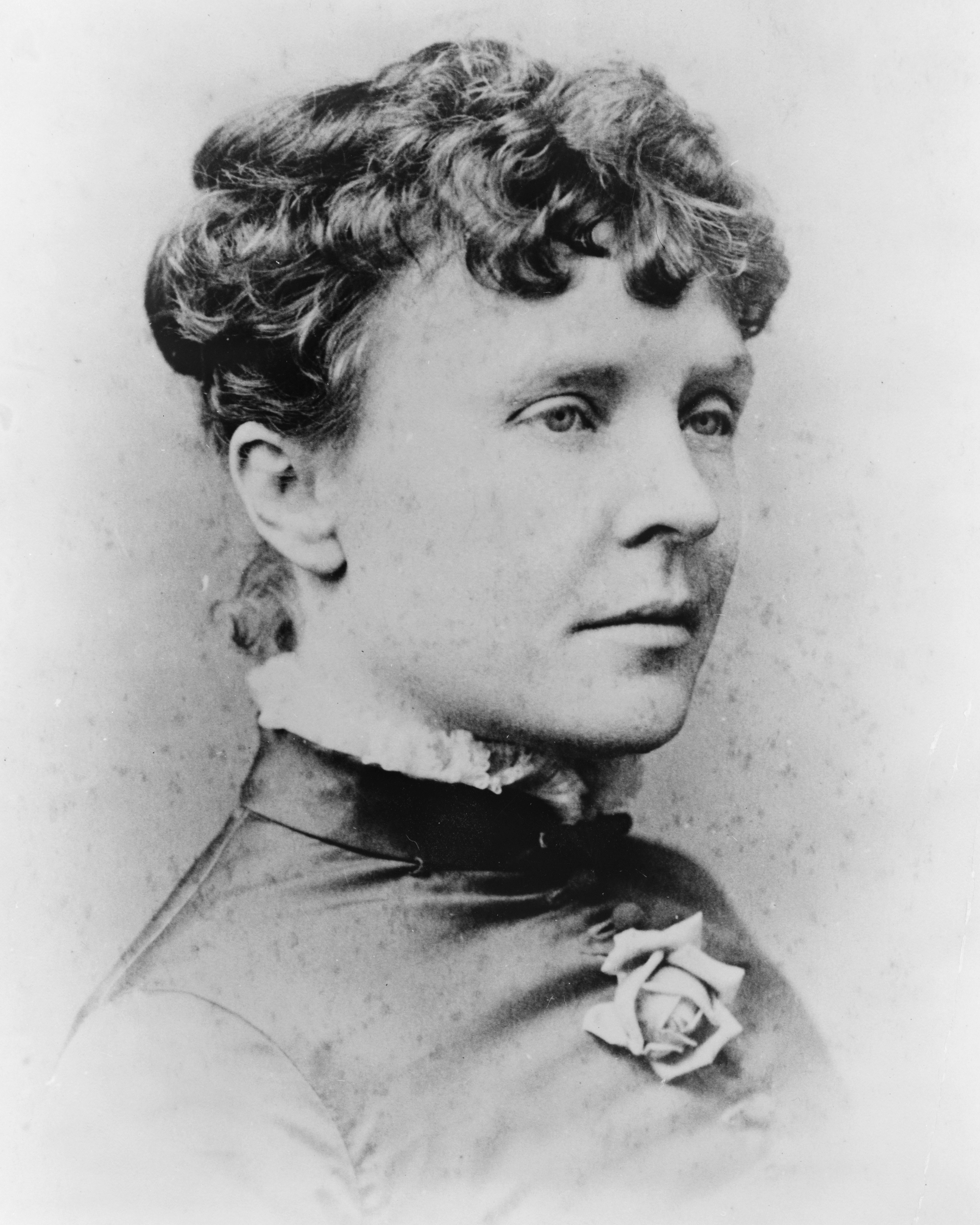
- Cleveland c. 1910s

First Lady of the United States
- In role March 4, 1885 – June 2, 1886
- President: Grover Cleveland
- Preceded by: Mary McElroy (acting)
- Succeeded by: Frances Cleveland

Personal details
- Born: Rose Elizabeth Cleveland; June 13, 1846 Fayetteville, New York, US
- Died: November 22, 1918 (aged 72) Bagni di Lucca, Tuscany, Kingdom of Italy
- Parent: Richard Falley Cleveland (father)
- Relatives: Grover Cleveland (brother)
- Education: Houghton Seminary

Rose Elizabeth Cleveland (June 13, 1846 – November 22, 1918) was an American author and lecturer. She was acting First Lady of the United States from 1885 to 1886, during the presidency of her brother, Grover Cleveland, who married in 1886.

Receiving an advanced education in her youth, Cleveland defied gender norms and pursued a career in a variety of literary and academic positions. When her unmarried brother was elected president, she acted in the role of first lady until his marriage to Frances Folsom. She used the role of first lady to galvanize support for women's suffrage, expressing little interest in more typical household management tasks.

After leaving the White House, Cleveland wrote several fiction and nonfiction works, many relating to women's rights. She was editor of a literary magazine for several months, and she continued teaching and lecturing. She met Evangeline Marrs Simpson in 1889, and the two became romantic partners, interrupted for several years by Simpson's marriage to Henry Benjamin Whipple. After reuniting, they moved to Italy in 1910, where Cleveland spent her final years helping war refugees during World War I and then Spanish flu patients, before contracting the disease herself and dying in 1918.

== Early life ==
Rose Elizabeth Cleveland was born in Fayetteville, New York, on June 13, 1846. The ninth and youngest child of Reverend Richard Falley Cleveland and Ann Neal Cleveland, she was known as "Libby" within her family. The Cleveland family arrived in the present-day United States with Moses Cleveland, who settled in the Massachusetts Bay Colony in 1635 after emigrating from Ipswich, England. From her mother's side, Cleveland was descended from Anglo-Irish and German Quaker families. As a young child, Cleveland rejected gender norms where she encountered them and engaged in an active lifestyle outdoors. Cleveland and her siblings were raised as Presbyterian, and she would remain devoted to the religion her entire life. The Clevelands were poor, and their father struggled to support the family. In 1850, he moved the family to Clinton in New York's Oneida County so he could work as a district secretary for the American Home Missionary Society. In 1853, they moved to Holland Patent, New York. Their father died shortly afterward; Rose was seven years old. She stayed in their Holland Patent home, called "The Weeds", with her mother as her siblings began moving out.

By the start of the American Civil War, when Cleveland was 14 years old, all of her siblings had moved out except for her 18-year-old sister Susan. Their brother Grover paid for them to go to college. Cleveland attended Houghton Seminary in Clinton from 1864 to 1866 and studied Greek and Latin literature. Shortly after graduating, she took a position at the school teaching history and literature. The following year, in 1867, she taught literature, math, and Latin at the Lafayette Collegiate Institute in Lafayette, Indiana. She then taught at a girls school in Muncy, Pennsylvania, in the late 1860s before returning to "The Weeds" in Holland Patent. She returned to Houghton Academy to again teach history, and she also taught Sunday school. She taught American history in New York City. Cleveland also delivered public lectures in the state of New York, speaking about topics including history and women's rights. The Magazine of American History published her lectures, and she was active in its editorial process.

Two of Cleveland's brothers, Frederick and Louis, were lost at sea in 1872 while on a ship from Nassau. Eventually, her time in Holland Patent was spent caring for her mother until her death in 1882. Cleveland inherited The Weeds from her mother. Her brother Grover was elected to be the governor of New York in 1882. Cleveland declined a teaching job in New York City so that she could assist him at the Executive Mansion. During this time, she published her first two poems in The Independent. Cleveland was with her brother at the Executive Mansion when he learned that he had been elected president, and she stood by him during his presidential inauguration.

== Acting first lady of the United States ==
When Grover became president of the United States in 1885, he had no wife to serve as first lady, so he asked Cleveland to fulfill the role. She accepted the position despite having little interest in it; she preferred academic life to social life. As was typical of first ladies of the time, Cleveland was responsible purely for domestic aspects of the White House, including the organization of social events. She most commonly held receptions in the Blue Room. Cleveland grew bored with White House reception lines and once said that to pass the time she would conjugate Greek verbs in her head. She was sometimes assisted by her sister, Mary Hoyt.

Cleveland was more academically-inclined than most women of her era. She was not interested in the small talk expected of her during social events, and writer Harry Thurston Peck said that her conversations were "decidedly allusive and interspersed with classical quotations". Her education served her well in the White House, where knowledge of history and languages was an asset when speaking to dignitaries from around the world. Shortly after her time as acting first lady began, Cleveland published her first book: George Eliot's Poetry, and Other Studies. The press did not treat her seriously as an intellectual because she was a woman, but her national renown as first lady helped sales, and she ultimately earned $25,000 (equivalent to $896,000 in 2025) in royalties across twelve published editions.

Among Cleveland's friends while she lived in the White House was the historian Laura Carter Holloway. Holloway was Cleveland's editor for George Eliot's Poetry, and Other Studies and later wrote a book on first ladies of the United States. Cleveland also befriended her predecessor Mary Arthur McElroy; both were the sisters of presidents who became White House hostess.

To protect Cleveland's privacy, the president kept the press from taking pictures of her, meaning that descriptions of her were often second-hand. She was described by contemporaries as "masculine" and as a "bluestocking". Many who knew her found her firm demeanor to be intimidating. She held a love of fashion and opted for bright dresses. Cleveland was generally well-liked by the public for what they saw as a moral lifestyle. In Washington, she was addressed as "Miss Rose". Her seriousness and respectability contrasted with her brother, particularly after he was discovered to have fathered a child out of wedlock. She was also praised for her ability to remember everyone who she interacted with. The increased attention she received as a public figure meant that false rumors spread about her, including that she was to be married to Representative Benjamin Le Fevre or to a clergyman.

Cleveland kept up-to-date on political issues. She held strong progressive opinions, and she continued to express them while she was acting as first lady. She supported the temperance movement, banning wine in the White House. Cleveland supported women's rights, publicly advocating women's suffrage and promoting the Women's Anthropological Society, which advocated the inclusion of women in science. She lived by the ideal of the New Woman that was advocated by the feminist movement of the time and was sympathetic to the Victorian dress reform movement that sought to move away from traditional conservative dresses, but her own deviation from the norm was limited to wearing low-cut dresses that exposed her shoulders—still a controversial choice. Cleveland also supported Indigenous sovereignty in the United States. She still held other prejudices common of the time, advising her brother not to appoint a significant number of Catholics to government positions. Later correspondences also indicate discriminatory views toward African Americans and the working class.

While she was acting as first lady, Cleveland became the subject of a ballad by Eugene Field in which she asked President Cleveland about whether he intended to marry. When her brother's bride, Frances Folsom, arrived in Washington on June 1, 1886, Cleveland met her and her mother at the train station and escorted them to the White House. Cleveland approved of the marriage, in large part because it meant that she could return to her previous life. She helped organize their wedding, and she left the White House after they were married, though she often returned in a social capacity.

== Later life ==
=== Literary and academic career ===
A month after Cleveland left the White House, she moved to Chicago to become the editor of the magazine Literary Life. Her brother urged her to decline, fearing that the magazine only wished to take advantage of her relation to the president. He offered her an annual sum of $6,000 (equivalent to $215,000 in 2025) to not take any such position. She refused any income from her brother, wishing to be financially independent. To be the editor of a magazine was rare for women at the time. Cleveland served as editor for only a few months before leaving, as she fell ill and the magazine was having financial problems. To complicate matters further, her family home, The Weeds, had caught fire.

In 1887, Cleveland moved to New York City to teach history at Sylvanus Reed's School for Girls. She rarely went out while teaching at the boarding school, instead focusing on her writing. Her brother Grover disapproved of the career. She left the following year after a disagreement with Reed regarding salary. In the final days of Grover's presidency, the first lady held a lunch in Rose's honor. Cleveland made several trips to Europe over the following years. Her prominence allowed her to socialize with celebrities and important political figures. Cleveland continued to express her political beliefs after leaving the White House. In 1887, she published a short story that was critical of women's fashion, which she believed was detrimental to women's health, while in 1909, she signed the national petition supporting women's suffrage.

=== Relationship with Evangeline Marrs Whipple ===
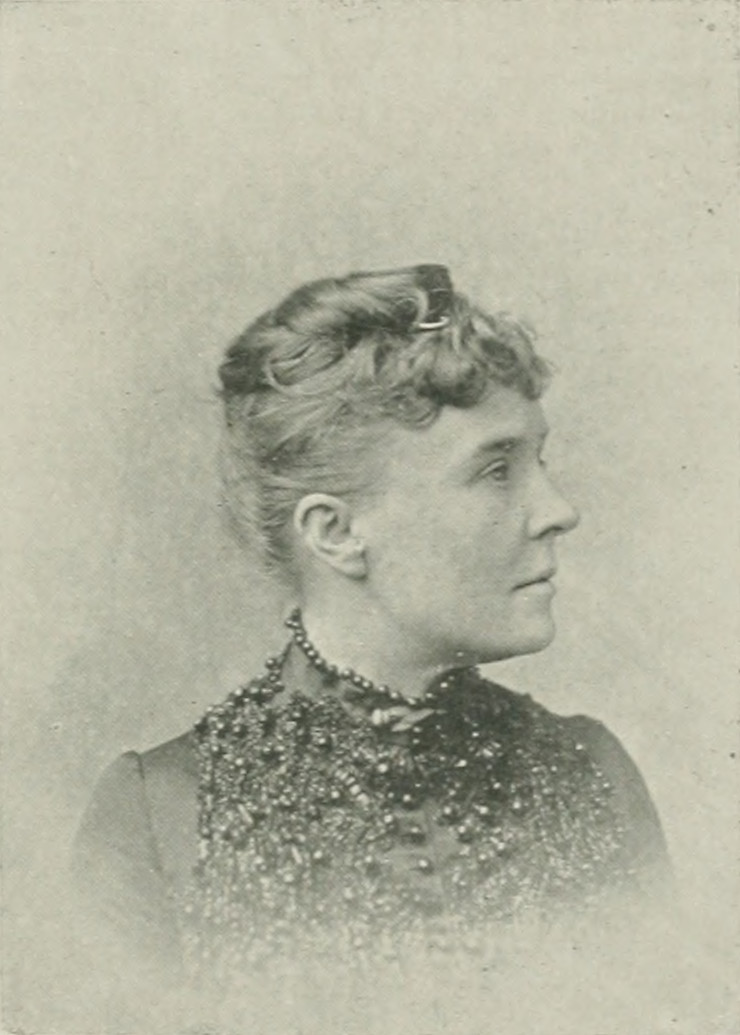
Cleveland in A Woman of the Century (1893)

Florida was a favorite destination for Cleveland, and she traveled there each year starting in 1888. She kept an orange grove in Dunnellon that became profitable shortly after these trips began. While staying in Florida in 1889, Cleveland met Evangeline Marrs Simpson and began a romance with her. The two had similar interests and educational backgrounds. Both were wealthy; Simpson was widowed after marrying into wealth while Cleveland enriched herself through her writing career. Their relationship had a sexual element beyond what was typical of the era's romantic friendship where same-sex couples had intimate but non-sexual relationships.

The earliest known letter between Cleveland and Simpson was sent on April 13, 1890. Their correspondences became more explicitly sexual over time. Cleveland was in constant anticipation of these letters and always demanded further contact from Simpson. The relationship was known by their families, but there is no indication that the public knew of its romantic nature. The couple took trips together, both within the United States and in Europe, between 1891 and 1893. They built a group of friends ten to twenty years their junior that accompanied them, including Evelyn Ames Hall, the daughter of Governor Oliver Ames of Massachusetts and wife of artist Frederick Garrison Hall, and Amelia Candler Gardiner, the daughter of Congressman John W. Candler of Massachusetts. They were also sometimes accompanied by two other friends, Adelaide Hamlin Thierry and Katherine Willard Baldwin.

The more explicitly romantic aspect of Cleveland and Simpson's relationship ended in 1892, when Simpson was engaged to the bishop Henry Benjamin Whipple. Their contact with one another decreased in 1893. Cleveland felt betrayed by Simpson's decision to marry. She traveled to Europe for a year to escape the situation before returning to the United States to work as a teacher. Cleveland began spending more time with their friend Evelyn Ames in 1895, and the two may have had a romantic relationship.

Cleveland urged Simpson not to go through with the wedding, but the wedding of Evangeline Marrs Simpson and Henry Benjamin Whipple took place on October 22, 1896. Cleveland decided on a trip to Europe afterward, and Ames joined her on the Normannia on December 5, 1896. Cleveland's correspondences with her friend, now named Evangeline Whipple, were formal and emotionless. Cleveland and Ames visited the home of Ames' sister, Islesboro, Maine, in 1898. They later purchased two houses there and co-owned a 220-acre farm. Cleveland returned to The Weeds in 1899, living there with Ames. She founded the Florida Audubon Society along with the Whipple and Marrs families in 1900 and served as a vice president for the group.

The bishop died on September 16, 1901, and Cleveland again hoped for a romance between her and Whipple. They began visiting one another and traveling the United States together in 1902. Their correspondence became frequent again, and a romantic element returned to their relationship by 1905. Whipple chose not to live with Cleveland this time, staying in Minnesota where she had lived with the bishop. Cleveland managed her Islesboro farm and her Dunnellon grove until 1907, when arthritis and a lack of energy made it too difficult to manage them both, and she sold the grove with Whipple's assistance.

=== Life in Bagni di Lucca, Italy ===
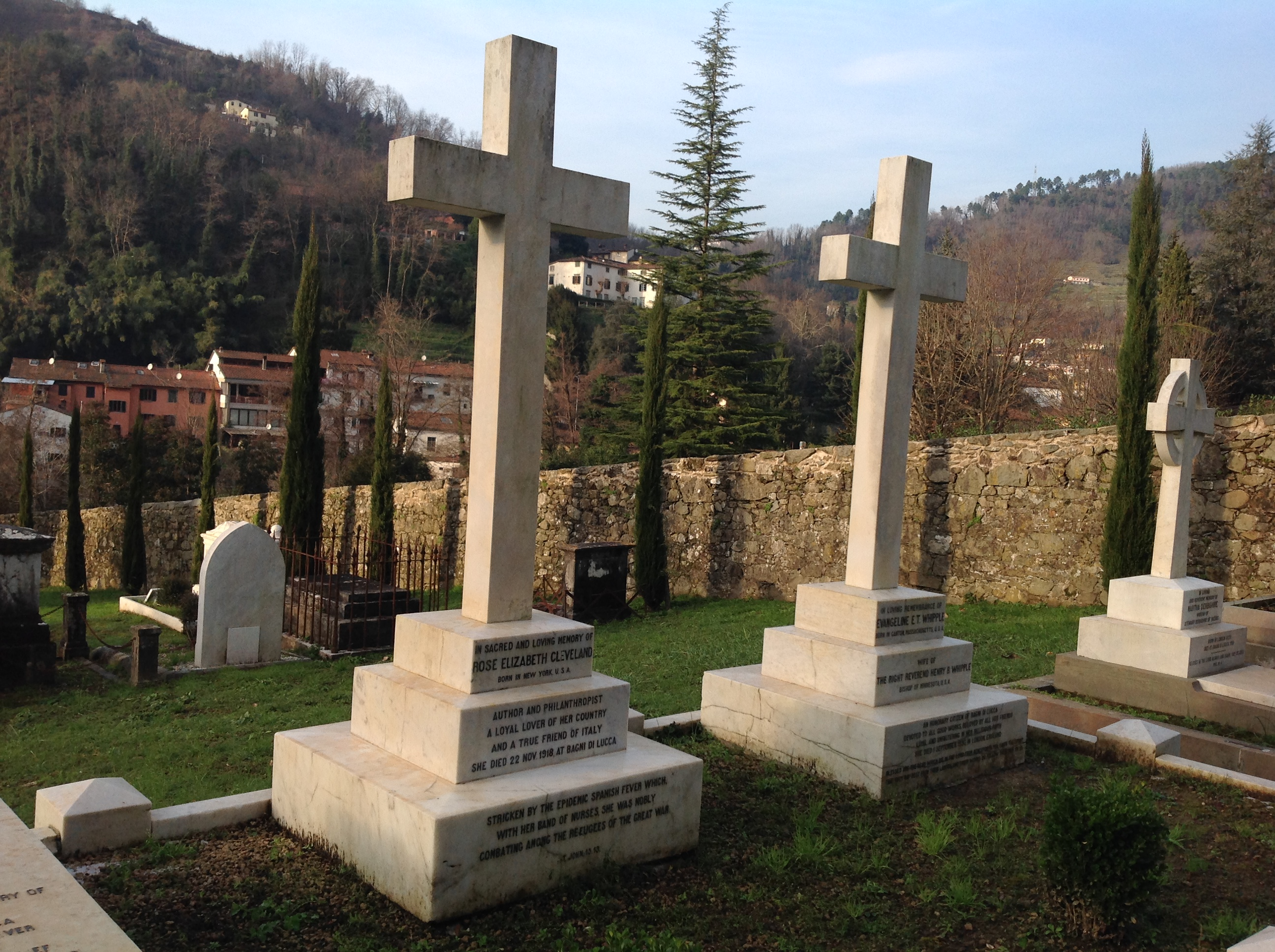
The graves of Cleveland and Whipple in Bagni di Lucca, Italy

When Whipple's brother fell ill in Italy in 1910, Cleveland accompanied her there to care for him. They boarded the SS Saxonia on July 20, and they stayed in Florence until the brother died in 1912. They chose to remain in Italy afterward, settling in Bagni di Lucca in Tuscany. Cleveland felt less of an inclination to express her beliefs about society through writing while living in Italy, as social norms were more relaxed in a way that allowed expats to have same-sex relationships. By 1914, they were joined in Bagni di Lucca by the English artist Nelly Erichsen.

Cleveland, Whipple, and Erichsen contributed to the war effort during World War I, both before and after Italy's entry into the conflict. She and Whipple petitioned the American consulate to let them travel between Italy, France, Switzerland, and the United Kingdom. Cleveland worked to recruit more physicians and nurses to help refugees during the war. Bagni di Lucca was overwhelmed by refugees from Gorizia and Veneto, with the town of about 2,000 people receiving about 1,000 refugees, and the three women took charge of managing the influx.

In 1918, Cleveland and Whipple founded a girls school in Bagni di Lucca. The Spanish flu occurred that year, and the women worked with the mayor to organize the town's response. Erichsen contracted the disease and died days later on November 15, 1918. Cleveland contracted the flu while caring for Erichsen and died on November 22, 1918. Cleveland's funeral was attended by many of the refugees whom she had helped during World War I and the Spanish flu, as well as the American consul and the mayor of Bagni di Lucca. Her coffin was draped with the 13-star flag of the United States, and the mayor ordered all businesses closed for the day. Whipple was buried beside Cleveland upon her own death from pneumonia and kidney failure twelve years later.

== Legacy and study ==
Cleveland's romantic letters to Whipple were acquired by the Minnesota Historical Society as part of their collection on Henry Benjamin Whipple. The set included correspondences from 1890 to 1910, though only a few letters exist from the final five years. As the letters were sexual in nature and documented a same-sex relationship, the Minnesota Historical Society chose to remove them from the collection and seal them away until 1980. An anonymous researcher at the historical society became aware of the letters in March 1978 and sent a tip to the Gay Task Force of the American Library Association. The Gay Task Force had the historian of sexuality Jonathan Ned Katz negotiate the release of the letters, and they were unsealed the same year.

Several studies have been written analyzing Cleveland's relationship with Whipple. The first was in December 1978 when Paula Petrik, a graduate student at Binghamton University, studied Cleveland's letters in her term paper. They were then discussed by historians John D'Emilio and Estelle Freedman in Intimate Matters: A History of Sexuality in America and by Katz in a 1989 article in The Advocate. Biographer Rob Hardy wrote about their relationship in his article "The Passion of Rose Elizabeth Cleveland" in 2007. A biography of Cleveland was published in 2014. Her letters to Whipple were published as a full collection in 2019. Study of their relationship has primarily focused on its timeline and periodization.

== Written works ==
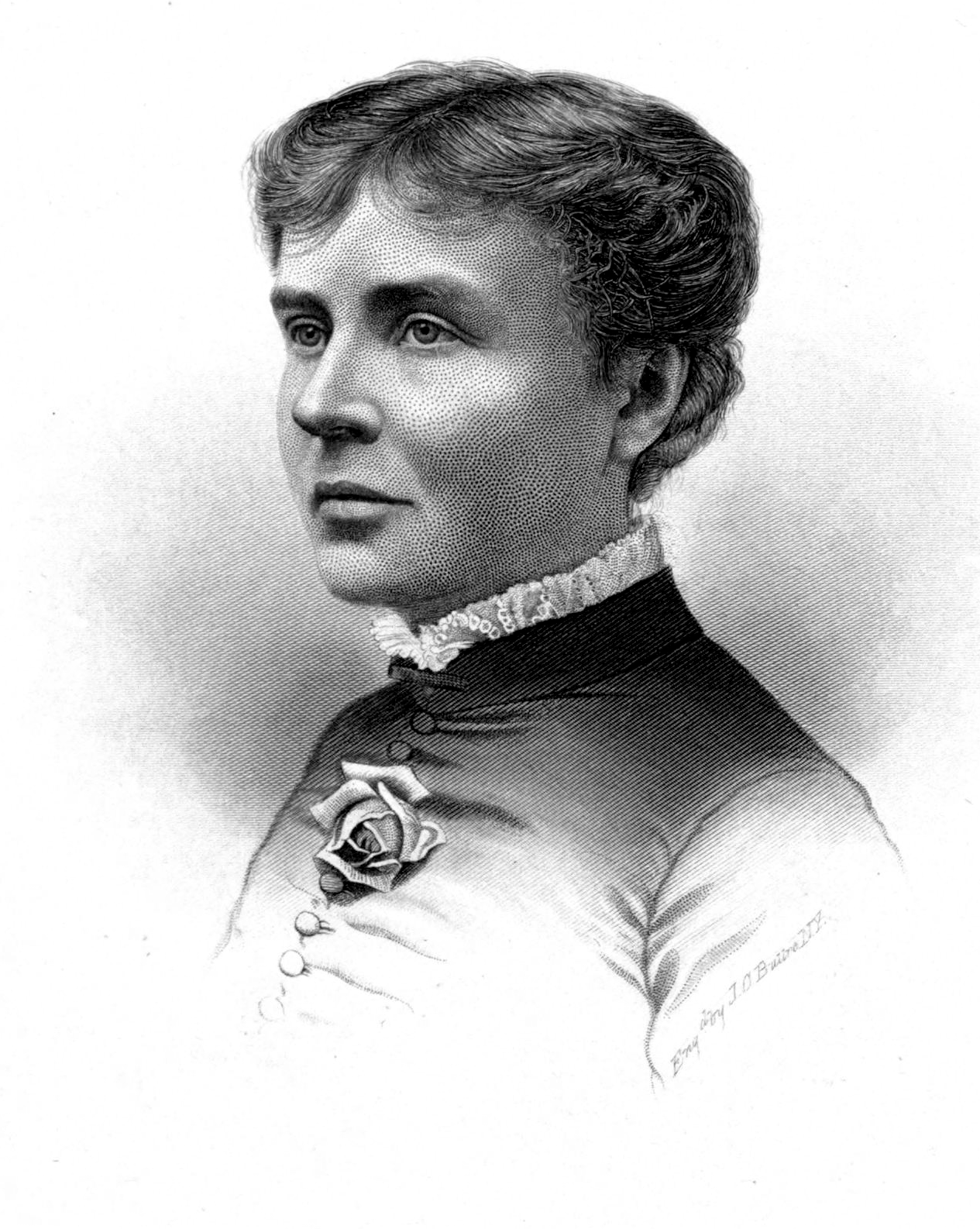
An etching of Cleveland that appeared in George Eliot's Poetry, and Other Studies (1885)

Rose Cleveland wrote or contributed to multiple literary works in her lifetime. Her writings often explored themes of women's rights and social norms surrounding gender and sexuality. She wrote multiple works of fiction about a doctor treating an unknown illness. In some cases, the illness is an allegory for subjugation of women.

The works written or co-written by Cleveland include:

- Sketches of History– An 1885 collection of lectures
- George Eliot's Poetry, and Other Studies – An 1885 collection of literary analysis essays
- The Long Run – An 1886 novel
- "The Dilemma of the Nineteenth Century" – A satirical 1886 poem about women's rights, published in Lippincott's Monthly Magazine
- "Woman in the Home" – An 1886 essay about women's rights, published in The Chautauquan
- "Robin Adair" – An 1887 short romance story, published in Godey's Lady's Book; Cleveland used the story to criticize women's fashion
- How to Win: A Book for Girls – An 1887 book co-authored by Cleveland with suffragist Frances Willard
- "My Florida" – An 1890 essay encouraging readers to visit Florida

Cleveland also contributed to writings by others:

- You and I: Or Moral, Intellectual and Social Culture – An 1886 collection of essays about etiquette with an introduction written by Cleveland
- Literary Life – A literary magazine of which Cleveland was the editor for several months in 1886
- American Magazine of History – A magazine with which Cleveland was involved
- The Social Mirror – An 1888 updated edition of You and I with a modified introduction written by Cleveland
- Our Society – An 1893 etiquette book that uses a variation of Cleveland's introduction from You and I and The Social Mirror
- Soliloquies of Augustine – Translated by Cleveland in 1910 with annotations

Cleveland wrote poetry for Whipple, and rather than describing their love, she told of her inability to find words that describe it. Cleveland's romantic letters to Whipple were collected and preserved, but much of Whipple's correspondence to Cleveland has been lost.

== Notes ==
Honorary titles
Preceded by Mary McElroy; Acting	First Lady of the United States; Acting; 1885–1886	Succeeded by Frances Cleveland
