= Nelly Erichsen =

English painter and illustrator (1862–1918)

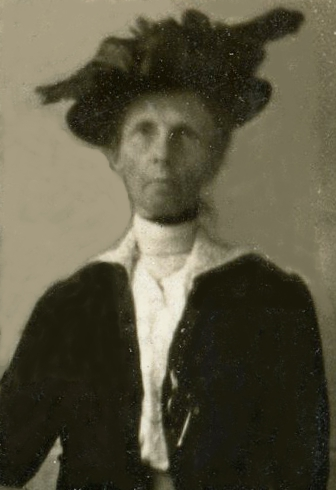
- Born: 9 December 1862; Newcastle upon Tyne, UK
- Died: 15 November 1918 (aged 55); Bagni di Lucca, Italy
- Resting place: English Cemetery at Bagni di Lucca
- Occupations: Illustrator, painter, writer

Nelly Erichsen (9 December 1862 – 15 November 1918) was an English illustrator and painter. She was born in Newcastle upon Tyne, into a wealthy professional Danish family. After studies at the Royal Academy of Arts in the 1880s, she pursued a successful career as an illustrator and writer, working with a number of publishing firms including J. M. Dent and Macmillan, and jointly publishing travel books with Janet Ross, a prominent member of the Anglo-Tuscan pre-War community. In July 2018, Nelly Erichsen - A Hidden Life, a biography of Erichsen by Sarah Harkness was published.

== Biography ==
=== Family history ===
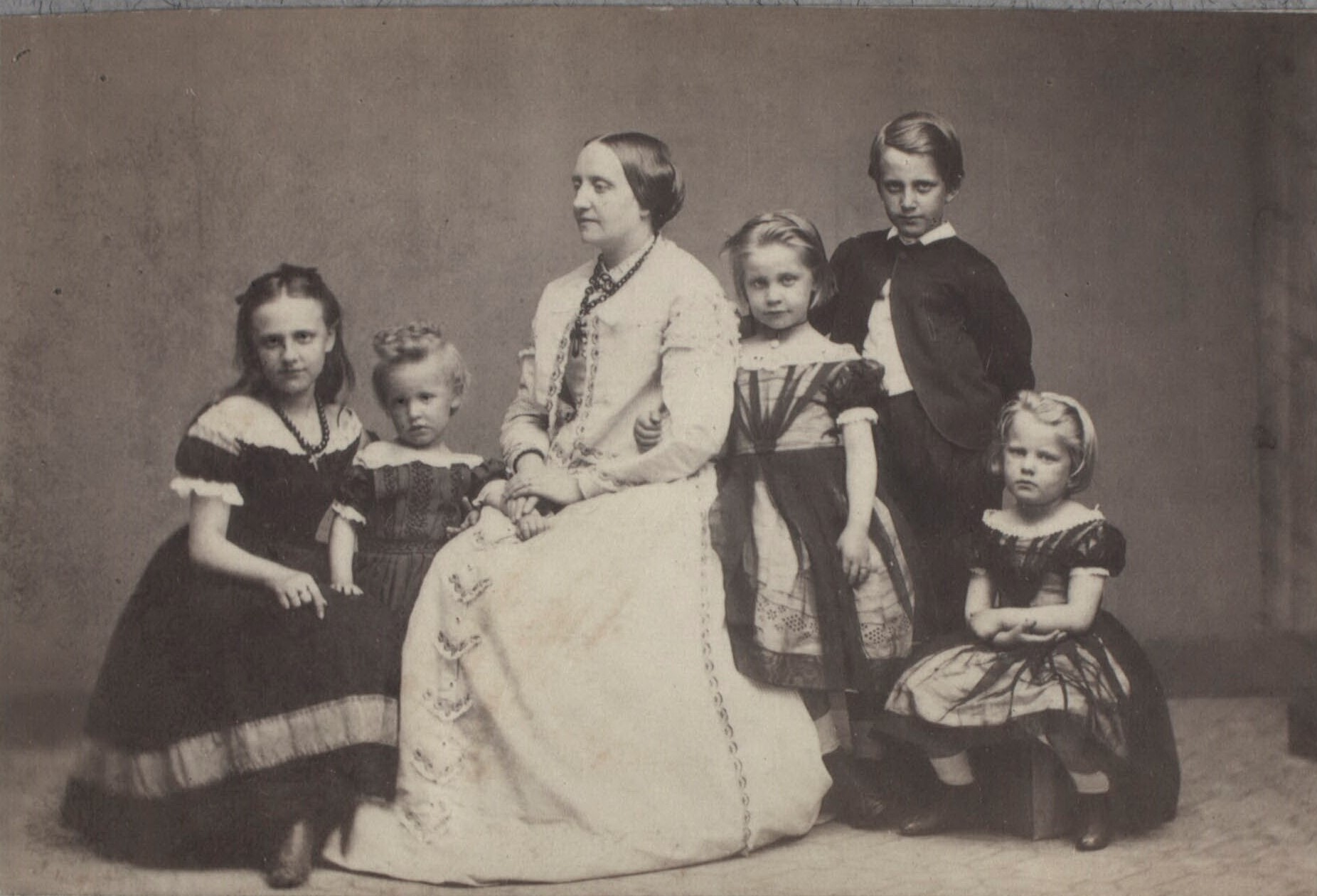
Anna Dorothea Erichsen with her children

Nelly Erichsen was born on 9 December 1862 in Newcastle upon Tyne, the fourth of six children. Her father was Herman Gustav Erichsen, born in Copenhagen in October 1826 who, after a 'commercial education' and travelling in Europe, came to Newcastle as a young man of just 22. Nelly's mother, Anna Dorothea Suhr, who was also born in Denmark, in 1827, was the sister of Ole Berendt Suhr.

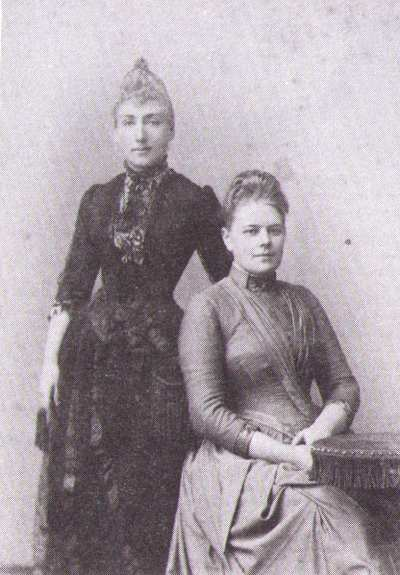
Erichsen and her cousin Ida Marie Suhr in 1884

In the late 1860s Herman, originally a general trader, invested in the formation of the Great Northern Telegraph Company and became that company's representative in England until the time of his death, moving his family to live in Tooting, South London. Herman was a successful businessman, with shareholdings in other telegraph businesses and companies in his native Denmark. He died on 6 December 1889, aged 63. Nelly Erichsen was fluent in Danish and kept a close relationship to her parents' home country. Her sister Alice Erichsen was a translator of Danish literature into English.

=== Artistic career ===
In the 1881 census, Erichsen, aged 19, is described as an art student at the Royal Academy Schools, though before the institution had any permanent lecturers. Her first student exhibit at the Royal Academy was in 1884, entitled The Deserted Homestead. Whilst a student, she resided on New Court, Lincoln's Inn, London, (now Carey Street within the London School of Economics campus) and the Royal Academy exhibited four more of her works in 1885:

- A Descendant of the Danes
- No truly, she is too disdainful
- Briars and Brambles
- A Study

Erichsen quickly gained some financial independence as a professional artist, including commissions to produce illustrations accompanying short stories in the English Illustrated Magazine. By 1890, she was working from Trafalgar Studios on Manresa Road in Chelsea. Those studios later became part of the South-Western Polytechnic Institute and Day School, a forerunner of the Chelsea College of Art and Design. In 1893, Erichsen exhibited a painting at the Royal Academy Summer Exhibition entitled Phyllis. Erichsen's painting The Orchard was reviewed in The Burlington Magazine for Connoisseurs. Other paintings from this time included The Magic Crystal, which showed Pre-Raphaelite influences.

At this time, Erichsen was friends with Bertha Newcombe, a member of the Fabian Society, and it was through her that she met George Bernard Shaw, playwright and co-founder of the London School of Economics. In 1894, Erichsen engraved plates for a J.M. Dent limited edition of the novels of the Scottish author Susan Edmonstone Ferrier.

From 1891 to 1897, Erichsen was a consistent contributor to the Royal Academy exhibitions, including the following works:

- The Magic Crystal (1891)
- Out of the deep have I cried unto thee (1892)
- The Emperor's New Clothes (1897)

Erichsen's works occasionally appear at auction. The highest recorded price for an Erichsen was paid at Sothebys in 2009 for the large oil "Going Home" which sold for £23,750.

By 1900, Erichsen was living in Italy. She is one of two illustrators, with M Helen James, for The Story of Assisi, by Lina Duff Gordon, published by J.M. Dent and printed by Turnbull and Spears, Edinburgh. The following year, she contributed to Florentine Villas by Janet Ross, Duff Gordon's aunt. Also in 1901, she was the sole illustrator for The Story of Rome, written by Norwood Young, another in the J.M. Dent series. This series proved very popular – The Story of Rome reached its fifth edition in 1905, and The Story of Assisi remained in print until at least 1909 and remains available today in reproduction hardcover form. Erichsen co-wrote at least two books in the "story of" series, The Story of Pisa (1909) and The Story of Lucca (1912).

In 1903, Erichsen worked with Edmund Garratt Gardner on The Story of Florence. Five years later she illustrated The Highways and Byways of Derbyshire, written by J. B. Firth. She is credited in the book's preface: "I am also more particularly indebted to Miss Erichsen not only for the charm of her illustrations but for numerous interesting details relating to persons and places".

September 1909 saw Erichsen living in Chipping Campden. She joined a community of craftsmen that was gathering there under the leadership of C.R. Ashbee – a well-known Chelsea architect, with some of his best work in Cheyne Walk, Chelsea, who was also a designer of metalwork and jewellery, a poet and writer. He was a founder of the Essex House Press, inspired by William Morris' Kelmscott Press. Chipping Campden was associated with the Arts and Crafts Movement from 1902 when Ashbee moved there with the Guild and School of Handicraft which he had founded in 1888. Erichsen was likely drawn there through an association with F. L. Griggs, one of the foremost illustrators and etchers of his day. Griggs was one of the first etchers to be elected to fellowship of the Royal Academy and like Erichsen was an illustrator for the Macmillan Highways and Byways Series.

=== Final years in Italy ===
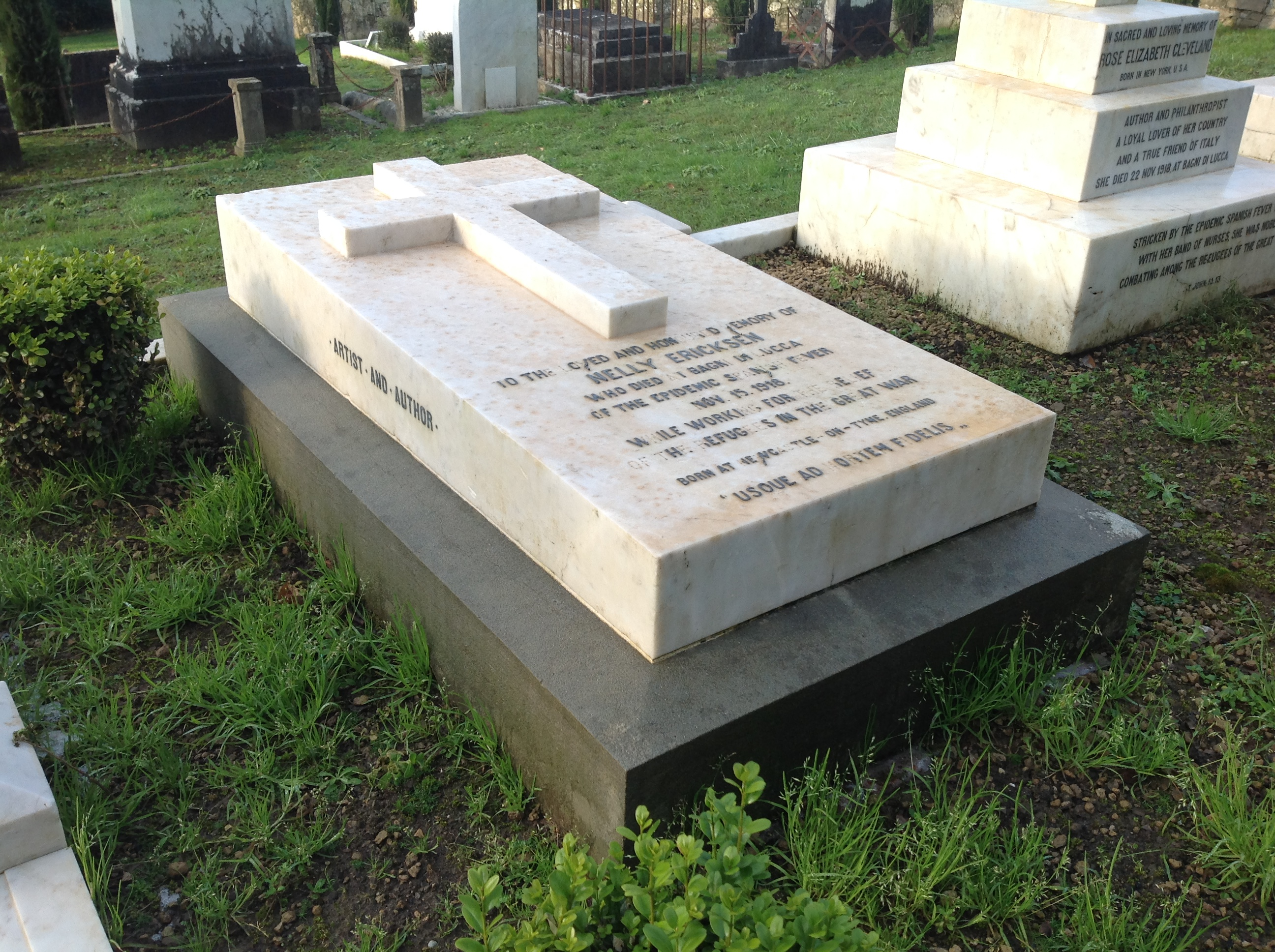
Cimitero Inglese, Bagni di Lucca, Nelly Erichsen (1862–1918)

From 1912 until November 1918, Erichsen was living in the quiet Tuscan spa town of Bagni di Lucca with two companions, Evangeline Marrs Whipple and Rose Cleveland. Whipple was the widow of the American Episcopal Bishop Henry Whipple, known for his evangelical work among the native Indian population. Rose Cleveland was the youngest sister of Grover Cleveland, President of the United States. Rose served as her brother's First Lady 1885–1886 before Cleveland married. Whipple and Cleveland had first met in the winter of 1889–1890, and resumed their romantic relationship in 1901 (after the death of Henry Whipple), moving from the US to Italy in 1910.

During the First World War, and especially after the intervention of the United States, the three women became organisers of aid work for the families of soldiers, particularly after the huge losses of the Battle of Caporetto (now Kobarid, Slovenia) in 1917. A penniless group of refugees was invited to Bagni di Lucca, and Whipple organised and financed a boarding school for their children under the auspices of the Stigmatine Sisters, which took in around one hundred children.

In 1918, both Rose Cleveland and Nelly Erichsen were killed by the 1918 flu pandemic which decimated the post-war world. Evangeline Whipple died in London in 1930, but was buried in Bagni di Lucca next to the tombs of the two friends who had preceded her.
