= United States Post Office (Newtonville, New York) =

- Newtonville Post Office
- U.S. National Register of Historic Places
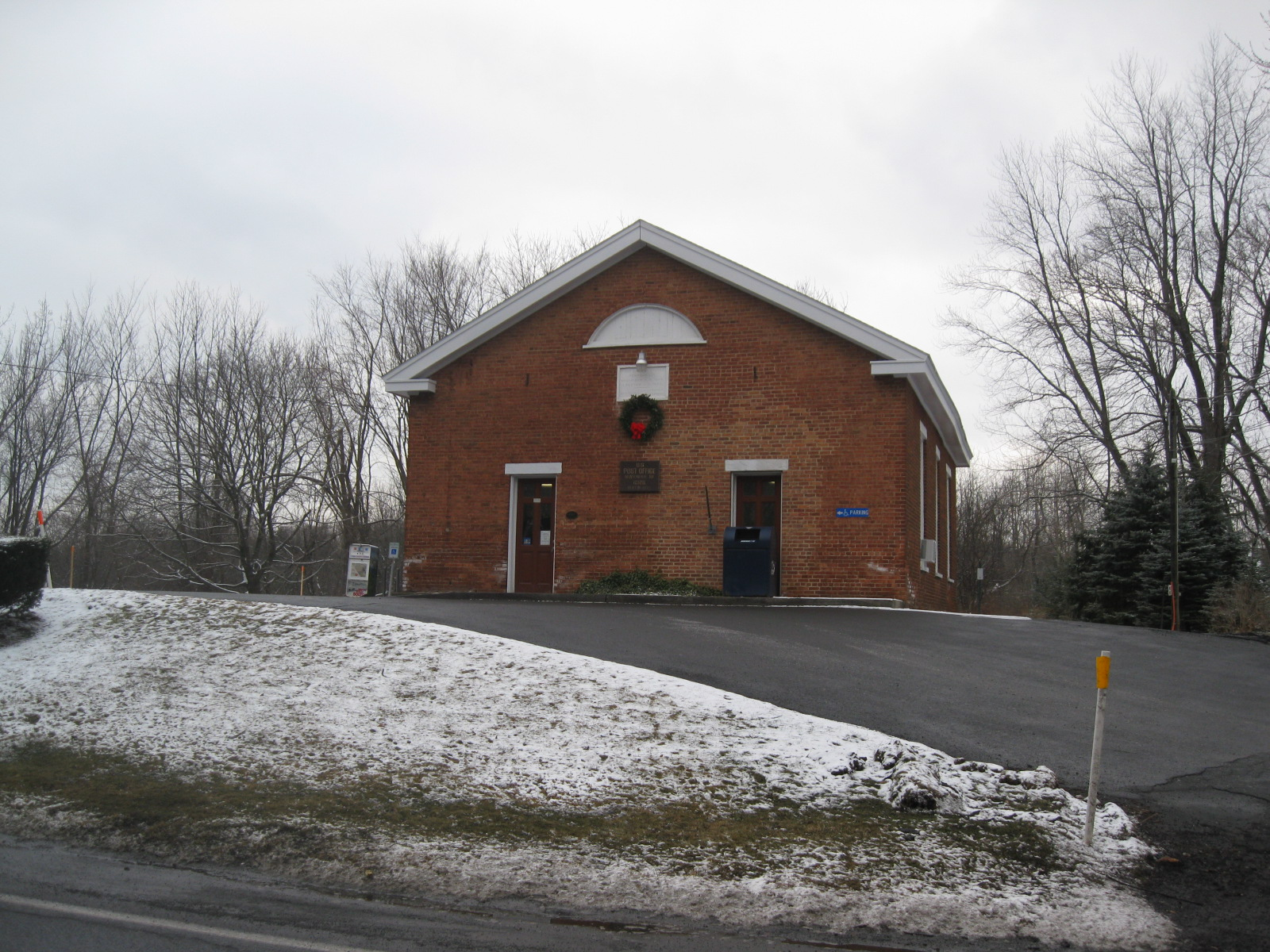
- Post Office in 2010

- Location within New York Location within the United States
- Location: 552 New Loudon Rd. (NY 9), Newtonville, New York
- Coordinates: 42°43′20″N 73°45′26″W
- Area: 5.5 acres (2.2 ha)
- Built: 1852
- NRHP reference No.: 73001162
- Added to NRHP: March 14, 1973

Newtonville Post Office is a historic post office building located at Newtonville in Albany County, New York, United States. It was built in 1852 as the First Baptist Church. It is a one-story, rectangular red brick building with a gable roof. The Rev. William Arthur, father of President Chester Alan Arthur lived at Newtonville from 1855 to 1863 and according to tradition is believed to have preached in the church. Church use ceased in the late 19th century and the building was used as a school, bus garage, farm machinery sales office, and after 1940 as a post office. It was listed on the National Register of Historic Places in 1973.
