= Neil Robinson (motorcyclist) =

Irish motorcycle racer

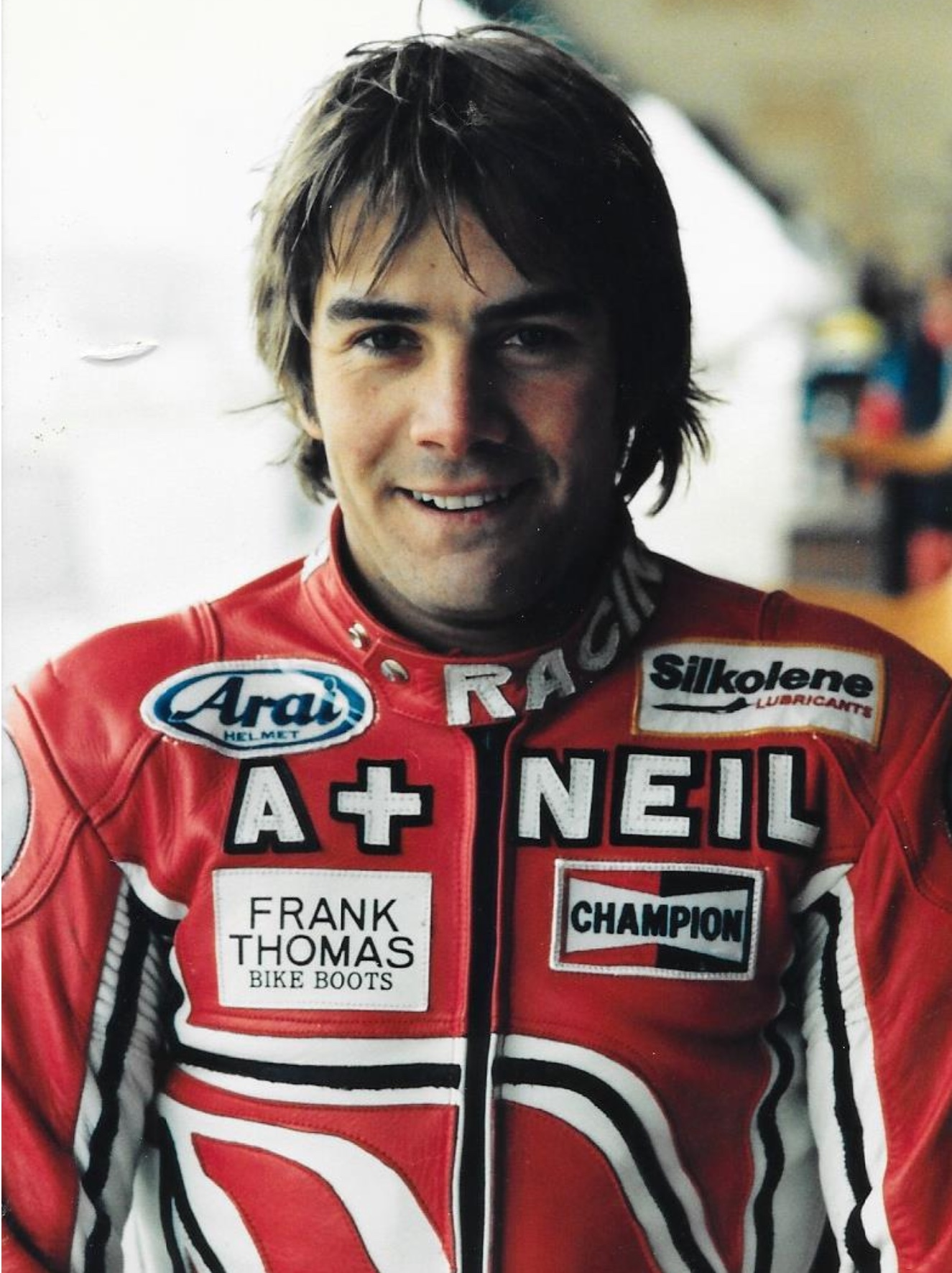
- Irish motorcycle racer, Neil Robinson
- Nationality: British
- Born: 29 July 1962; Cullybackey, County Antrim
- Died: 13 September 1986 (aged 24); Oliver's Mount, Scarborough, North Yorkshire, England
- Bike number: 90
Motorcycle racing career statistics
Isle of Man TT career
TTs contested	1 (1986)
TT wins	0

Neil Robinson (29 July 1962 – 13 September 1986) was a motorcycle circuit and road racer from Ballymena, County Antrim, Northern Ireland. Robinson died aged 24 during a practice session at Oliver's Mount racing circuit, Scarborough.

== Racing career ==
=== Early years ===
In 1983 Robinson made an immediate impact on the British domestic racing scene, winning the 250cc Championship riding a Yamaha RD250.

=== 1986 season ===
For the 1986 racing calendar Robinson initially campaigned Suzuki machinery in a privateer capacity, being sponsored by a used car business.

Making his debut at the Isle of Man TT in June of that year Robinson was entered in three races: the TT Formula 1, Production B and the Senior TT. Robinson enjoyed a constructive week in the pre-race practices and qualifying, being timed as the 12th fastest for the Formula 1 TT.

Building on his practice lap times, in the Formula 1 race he took his machine home in 11th place, recording an average race speed of 108.35 miles per hour (174.37 km/h) following 226.38 miles of racing and which resulted in him being the best placed of the newcomers.

This was followed by the Production B Race with Robinson securing 22nd place with an average race speed of 103.93 miles per hour (167.26 km/h). The week's racing concluded with disappointment for Robinson when he was forced to retire in the premier race, the Senior TT.

The 1986 Isle of Man TT was the subject of a documentary film produced by BBC Television. The documentary, entitled The Mecca of Motorcycling, featured Robinson prominently as it focused on his getting to understand the 37.73 miles of the Snaefell Mountain Course and the various idiosyncrasies involved with competing at the Isle of Man TT.

Despite his setback in the Senior TT race, Robinson's consistency had come to the attention of Suzuki Racing's Rex White who offered Robinson a limited contract with the Skoal Bandit Suzuki Team. This allowed Robinson the chance to replace Chris Martin whose season had ended through injury, and thereby offered Robinson the opportunity of competing in the TT Formula 1 World Championship on factory machinery alongside Paul Iddon.

Robinson made his debut for Suzuki at the Dutch TT held at TT Circuit Assen. Robinson made an immediate impact, dicing at the head of the field along with Joey Dunlop and Kevin Schwantz he was well placed for a podium finish when he suffered a broken chain.

The following round was held at Circuito de Jerez, Spain. Although the hot track conditions experienced during the race were something to which Robinson was not particularly accustomed to, he nevertheless managed to secure third place behind race winner Graeme McGregor.

Technical misfortune accompanied Robinson at the following round which was raced on the road circuit at Vila Real. Again Robinson started the race brightly and led the field until a loose fairing forced him to stop and make adjustments. The time lost undergoing the alterations meant Robinson slipped down the field, finally coming home in fifth place.

The Championship then moved on to Finland with the Imatra Circuit playing host. Robinson was again at the head of the field, tussling for the lead when his machine sustained a puncture. Whilst this resulted in him missing out on first place, Robinson was still able to secure 3rd place on the podium.

The World Championship concluded at the 1986 Ulster Grand Prix where Robinson achieved a memorable performance in the Formula 1 Race. In wet conditions Robinson claimed victory over Joey Dunlop, who at that time was the newly crowned World TT Formula 1 Champion. Robinson's further endeavours at the meeting resulted in disappointment in the TT Classic Race which saw him retire with a blown engine whilst Dunlop upped the outright lap record to 120.83 miles per hour (194.46 km/h).

A collection of results saw Robinson standing on the threshold of what promised to be a brilliant international career, being on the cusp of signing a full-time contract with the factory Suzuki Racing Team when he became the 13th rider to die on the Oliver's Mount circuit at Scarborough. Competing at the circuit for the first time, Robinson crashed in dense undergrowth and trees on the uphill Quarry Hills section on his sixth lap of practice. He suffered head injuries and a broken leg, and died in the evening in Hull Royal Infirmary.

== Legacy ==
=== Neil Robinson Trophy ===
Robinson's name remains very popular within the motorcycle racing fraternity. The Neil Robinson Trophy is considered as one of the most prestigious in Irish Motorcycle Racing. The trophy is awarded to the winner of the Irish Minibike Championship. Previous winners of the trophy include Joey Dunlop, Carl Fogarty and Alastair Seeley.

=== 90 Club ===
The 90 Club was a group formed to support Robinson during his racing career.

== Donny Robinson ==
Robinson's older brother, Donny Robinson (1956 - 1999), was killed in a racing accident at the 1999 North West 200 at Coleraine. He crashed heavily at the Mill Road Roundabout whilst riding a 125cc machine during a wet practice session and died the next morning at Coleraine Hospital from multiple injuries. Aged 43 at the time of death, Donny had retired from his Grand Prix career in 1985 to concentrate on road racing.
