= Newtonville United Methodist Church =

Historic church in New York, United States

- U.S. National Register of Historic Places
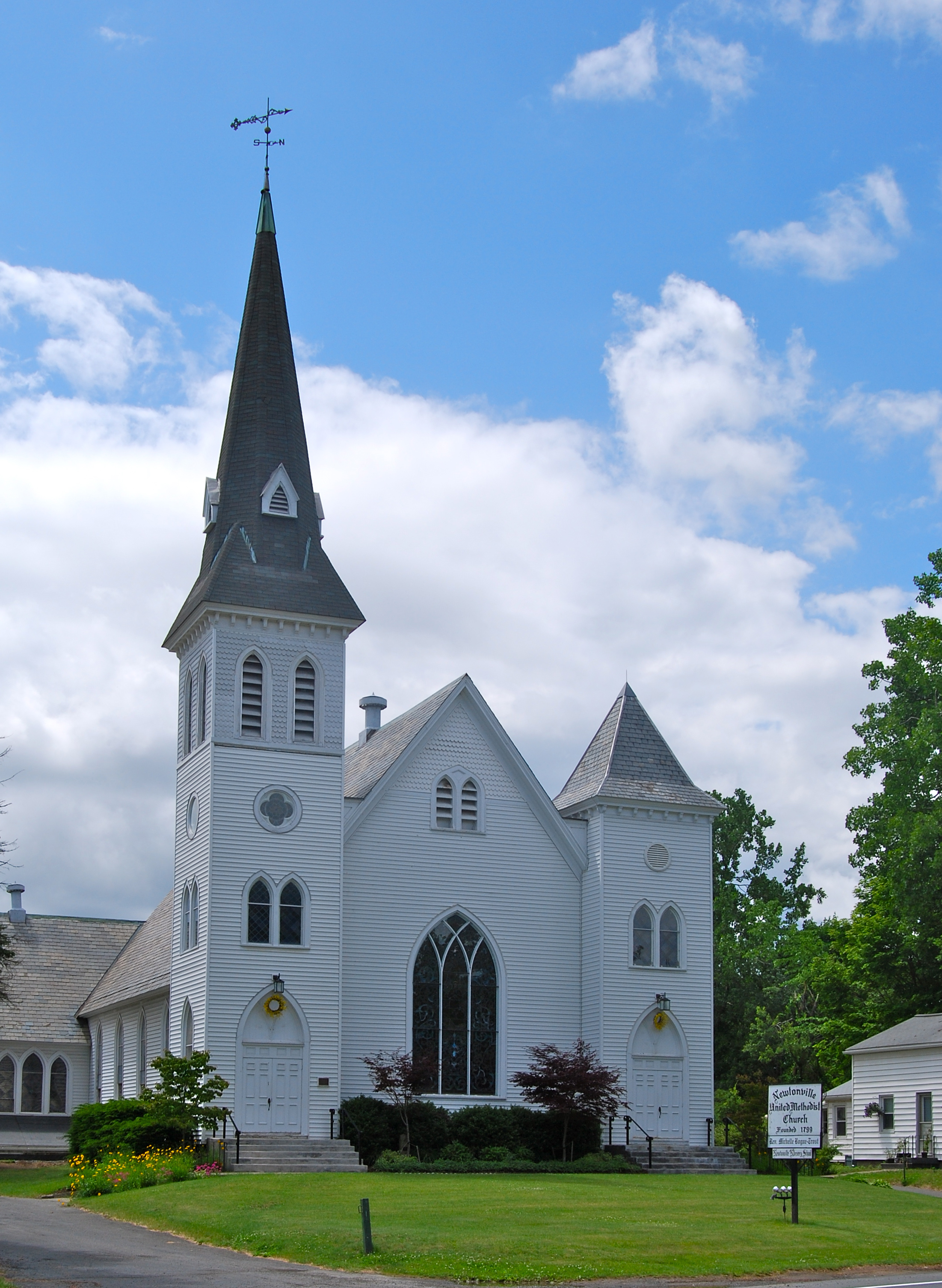

- Location within New York Location within the United States
- Location: Loudon Rd. at Maxwell Rd., Newtonville, New York
- Coordinates: 42°43′28″N 73°45′36″W
- Area: 2.5 acres (1.0 ha)
- Built: 1893
- Built by: Horton, H.P.
- Architect: Hoffman, Ernest
- Architectural style: Late Gothic Revival
- NRHP reference No.: 01000580
- Added to NRHP: May 30, 2001

Newtonville United Methodist Church is a historic United Methodist church located on Loudon Road at Maxwell Road in Newtonville, Albany County, New York.

There has been a Methodist congregation meeting at the present site of the church since 1828. Three area congregations merged to the Newtonville location in 1858, and the church was called Asbury Chapel. When the building then in use exceeded its physical limitations, the current building was constructed. This new structure, built for a cost of $11,150.00 and paid for in 3 years, was called "Asbury Methodist Episcopal Church." The congregation was incorporated as the First Methodist Episcopal Church of Newtonville in 1916.

The current late Gothic Revival structure was built in 1893, and added to the National Register of Historic Places in 2001. In the late 1940s the men of the church dug, by hand, a cellar to create space for a fellowship hall under the sanctuary. An education structure was added to the rear of the main sanctuary building in 1959. A sexton's cottage, also dating to the late 19th century, sits next to the church building. The former parsonage on the site was removed in the early 1960s, and the church's carriage sheds were destroyed by fire. The current pastor at Newtonville United Methodist Church is the Rev. Dr. Nick Bufano, who has been serving there since 2021.
