= Verdoy Schoolhouse =

- U.S. National Register of Historic Places
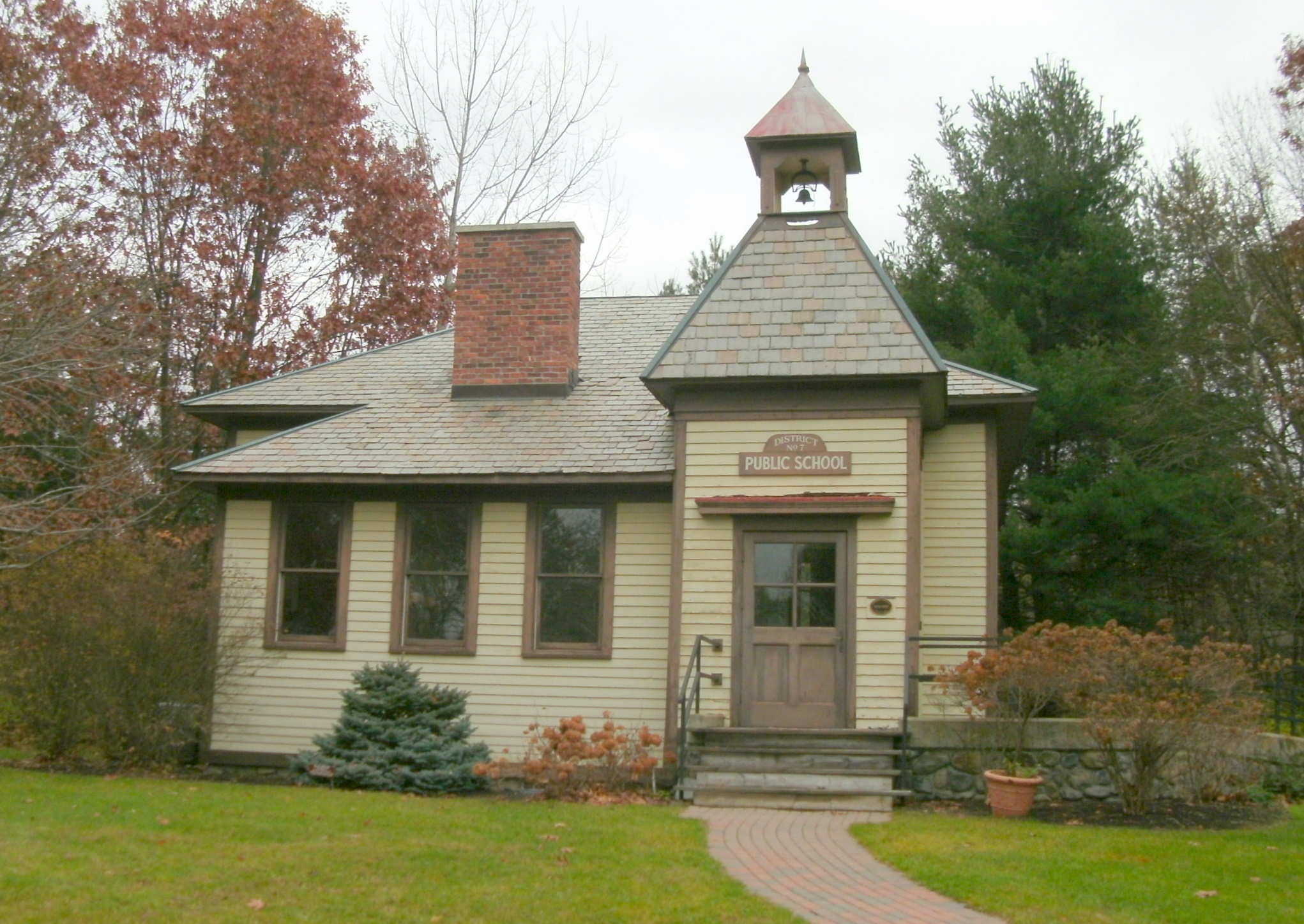
- Verdoy Schoolhouse, November 2010

- Location within New York Location within the United States
- Location: 207 Old Niskayuna Rd., Newtonville, New York
- Coordinates: 42°43′57.7″N 73°46′38″W
- Area: less than one acre
- Built: 1910
- Architectural style: Queen Anne
- MPS: Colonie Town MRA
- NRHP reference No.: 97000117
- Verdoy School
- U.S. National Register of Historic Places
- Location: 957 Troy-Schenectady Rd., Colonie, New York
- MPS: Colonie Town MRA
- NRHP reference No.: 85002752
- Added to NRHP: October 3, 1985
- Added to NRHP: March 9, 1997

Verdoy Schoolhouse, also known as District No. 7 Schoolhouse, is a historic one-room school building located at Newtonville in Albany County, New York. It was built in 1910 and is an asymmetrical frame building. It features a slate covered hipped roof crowned by a small belfry and a massive chimney at the center of the roof. Until 1996 when moved to the grounds of the Casparus F. Pruyn House, the school was located on Troy-Schenectady Rd. and was previously listed in 1985 as the Verdoy School.

It was listed originally on the National Register of Historic Places in 1985 and relisted in 1997.
