= Cullybackey High School =

Cullybackey College

Location
- 44 Pottinger Street; Cullybackey, Ballymena, County Antrim, BT42 1BP; Northern Ireland; 54.683°N 5.968°W

Information
- Type: Secondary School
- Motto: Per Angusta Ad Augusta
- Established: 1968; 58 years ago
- Local authority: Education Authority
- Chairperson: Mrs G.E. Scott, MA, BSc, PGDE
- Headmaster: Mr D. Donaldson, B.Ed., M.Ed, P.Q.H
- Years offered: 8 to 14
- Gender: Mixed
- Age: 11 to 18
- Enrolment: 700
- Colours: Black and Red
- Website: www.cullybackeycollege.org.uk

Cullybackey College is a co-educational, non-selective post-primary school in the village of Cullybackey, County Antrim, Northern Ireland. It was established in 1968 under its former name of Cullybackey High School. In 2013 the Governors decided to rename the school to Cullybackey College.

== Performance and Attainment ==
In 2022, 95% of students achieved a minimum of 5 GCSE grades A* to C.

== Awards and recognition ==
Cullybackey College was recognized in 2003 by the BT Group Education Programme Schools Awards for its "School Democracy" project, which was developed in conjunction with elections to the Northern Ireland Assembly. In addition to information shared by way of the school newsletter and website, the students ran an Internet Awareness Evening for the parents of all school-aged children in the school's area.
