= Patroon Agent's House and Office =

Historic house in New York, United States

- U.S. National Register of Historic Places
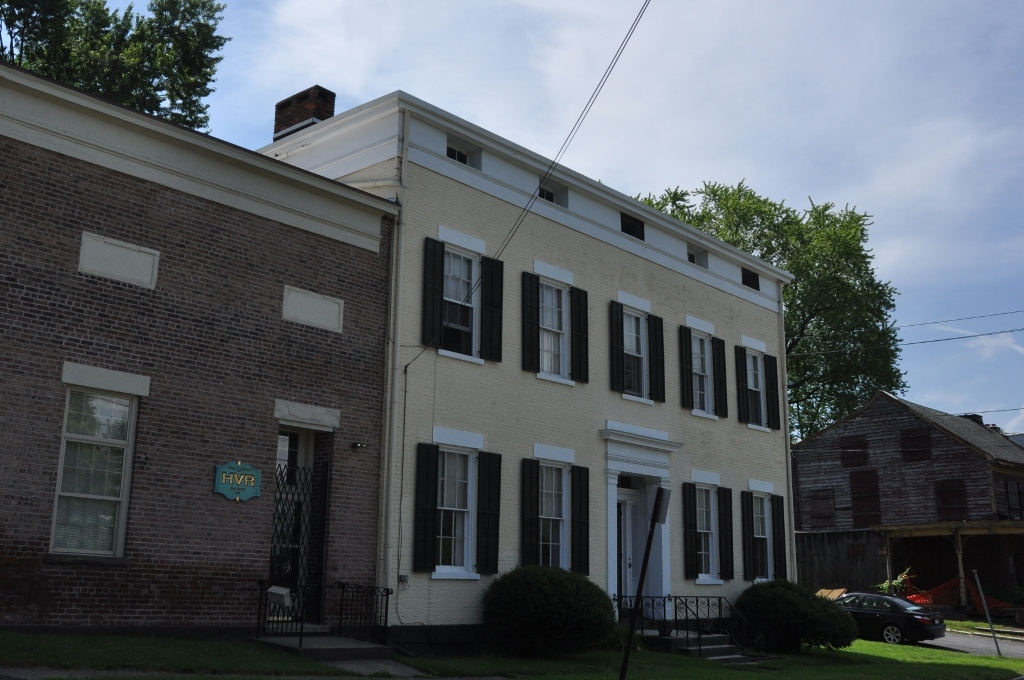

- Location within New York Location within the United States
- Location: 15 Forbes Ave., Rensselaer, New York
- Coordinates: 42°39′26″N 73°44′7″W
- Area: less than one acre
- Built: 1839
- Architectural style: Greek Revival
- NRHP reference No.: 79001622
- Added to NRHP: August 3, 1979

Patroon Agent's House and Office, also known as the Casparus Pruyn House and Office or Whish-Hull House and H. V. Rector office, is a historic home and office located on the Hudson River at Rensselaer in Rensselaer County, New York. It was built and first occupied Nov. 29, 1839 and consists of a 2 1/2-story rectangular brick residence with an attached 1-story rectangular brick office in the Greek Revival style. It was built by the Van Rensselaer family as a home and office for Casparus F. Pruyn, rent collection agent for William Van Rensselaer who had inherited the "East Manor" in 1839, consisting of Rensselaer County from his father Stephen. Today, the Patroon Agent would be considered the Chief Operating Officer of a corporation; also, several other Patroon Agent Houses have been located in and around Albany over the 200+ years of the patroonship.

The properties face the Hudson River and are visible across the river from Interstate-787 on Albany's west bank. Located in what was originally settled as Bath, then later Bath-on-Hudson (incorporated into the City of Rensselaer in 1903), the property is situated at the riverfront southern boundary of Beverwyck, William Paterson van Rensselaer's estate situated facing the river on the ridge northeast of the Bath ferry landing. The house features an operating water-collection system for the many mineral springs that percolate in the area that was originally used for indoor plumbing; this system includes brick and cast-iron cisterns, channels with brick walls and ash-plank linings and an outflow now connected to the city storm-sewer system channeling the constant flow of 52 F water. In February 2013, a City contractor installing new sewer lines south on Forbes Avenue discovered a substantial underground water spring flow mid-street, between # 5 and 7 Forbes Avenue. After excavating 18 ft deep, a dewatering system of crushed stone and perforated drainage pipes was installed between Tracy and Central Avenues to divert this flow south to the city storm sewer system. This diversion—thought to be from an underground diagonal streamflow across the hillside between Forbes and Broadway—relieved virtually ALL groundwater inflow in all basements along Forbes Avenue, including drying up completely the springs and drainage system in the cellar of this subject structure. Years later, the spring water has returned to its channels, at a lower volume.

The center-hall interior is formal with two large rooms deep on either side of the hall that features an oval, glass-paned oculus skylight at roof level atop the three-story galleried staircase with turned mahogany bannisters. This stairwell originally rose open from the cellar to the servants' quarters, now the attic, but was partitioned when the house was divided into north and south duplex units after the van Rensselaer family first sold it in 1865. Later, central heating replaced the use of 8 faux-grained black marble fireplaces and the two kitchen hearths in the cellar. The duplex layout consists of the north half containing the center hall, and the south using the side (Central Avenue) entrance and a perpendicular simple mahogany bannister servants' staircase to access the three floors and cellar.

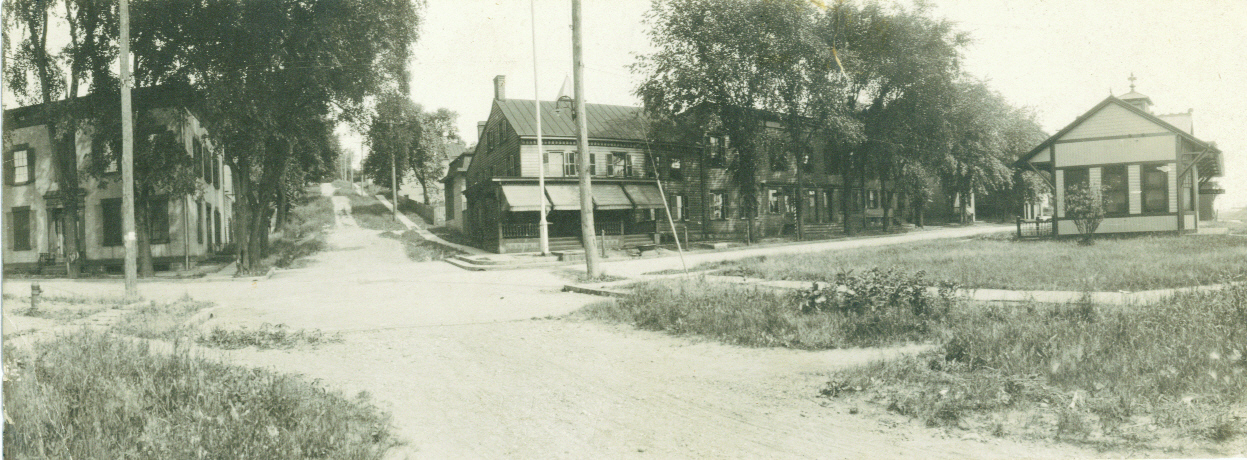
Patroon Agent's House and Office shown at left in an early photograph of the Clark-Dearstyne-Miller Inn and Bath Railroad Station at right.

The north, rear, first floor (dining) room features a pair of built-in corner closets with concave-curved doors; the front (living) and back (dining) rooms are divided by sliding pocket doors. All interior doors are grain-painted mahogany and feature original brass hardware, stamped "A. Wollensak, Albany." All rooms feature heavy plaster moulding at the 14' ceilings and deep wood-paneled trim and folding casement shutters at all windows. The formal first-floor rooms now have grain-painted floors, but were originally covered with tan, red and black over-plaid ingrained wool carpet, a swatch of which survives. The ground floor is lined with a course of bricks between the sub-flooring and finished, plastered cellar ceiling providing insulation and fire resistance from the kitchen areas below. The exterior walls are constructed in an envelope fashion with an air space between the heavy brick exterior and the heavy plaster interior walls. This air space "breathed" through warm or cool air circulation from the cellar upwards and across the rafters and exited out the oculus cupola windows atop the roof. The cupola was lost during the Hurricane of 1938, which also precipitated a water-borne collapse of a section of the north end of the east cellar wall.

The adjacent (north) Patroon Agent's Office, separated from the house property in 1865, has an elaborate set of heavy cast-iron security features, including doors, interior window shutters, iron bars and drop-down panels at the interior windows of what was likely a vault. An open cistern area in the main office floor has now been covered over to provide floor space in the large, elegant vaulted-ceiling room. This area was rehabilitated and decorated as offices in the early 1990s for a prominent general contractor, Henry V. Rector and is now owned and occupied by Kot Electrical Contractors.

Pruyn resided and conducted the Patroon's business here between 1839 and 1844. Several signed rent receipts, acknowledging cash, pounds of wheat, fowls and other agricultural products "on account of rent" are in the collection of the current Agent's House owner. Pruyn was a central figure in the Anti-Rent War at Rensselaerswyck. Pruyn previously resided at Colonie at what is now known as the Casparus F. Pruyn House.

Further detail and pictures are provided in the compilation book "Three Villages, One City" by Douglas L. Sinclair, edited by Raymond W. Hull, encompassing a reprint of The Yankee Doodle Series by Josephine M. Fraser (1976) all published by the City of Rensselaer Historical Society in 1992. The house has also been featured in the Troy Record, May 28, 1979, and the Albany Times Union, June 27, 1985.

It was listed on the National Register of Historic Places in 1979.

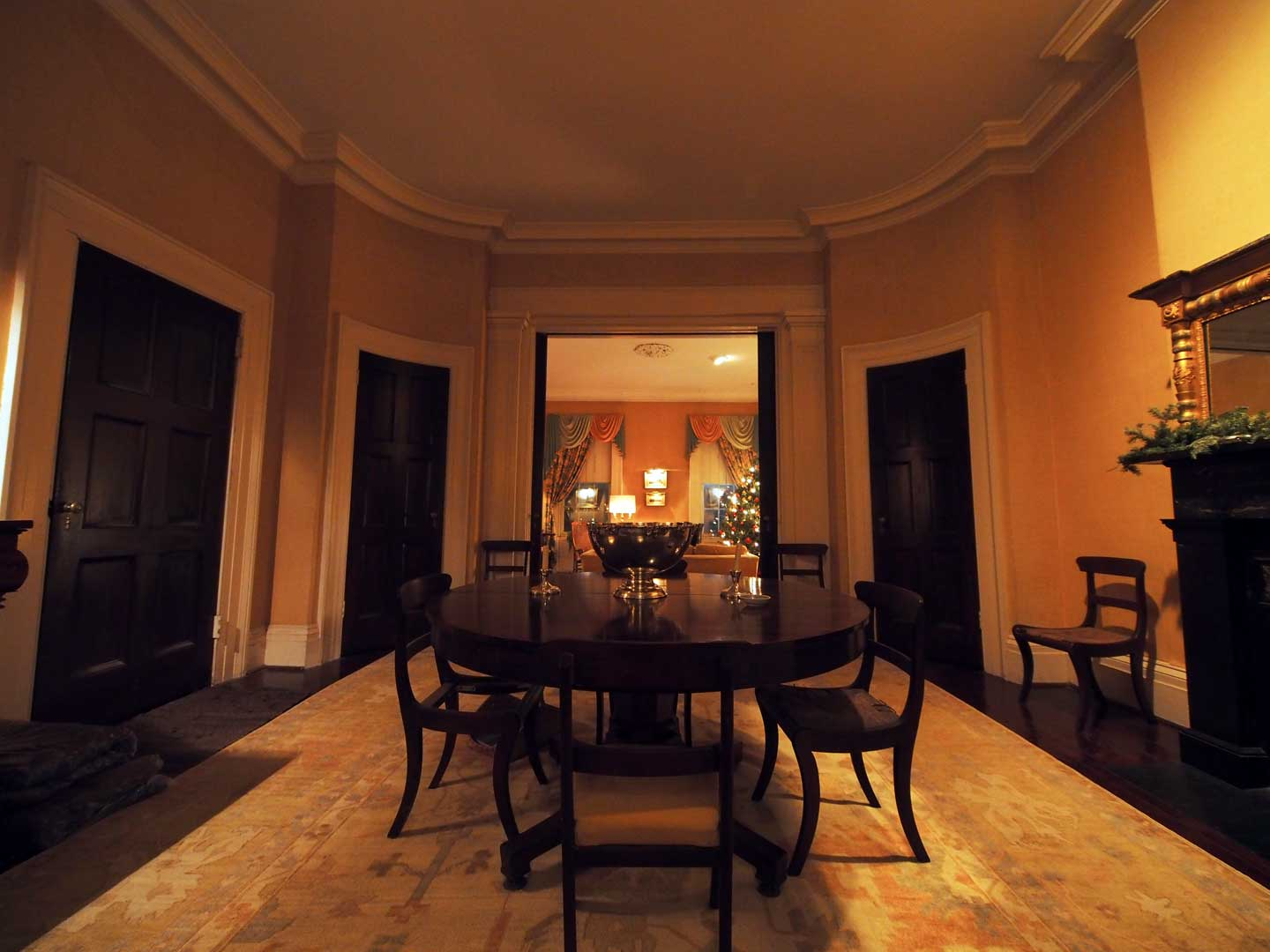
The Patroon Agent's House Dining Room, December 2012

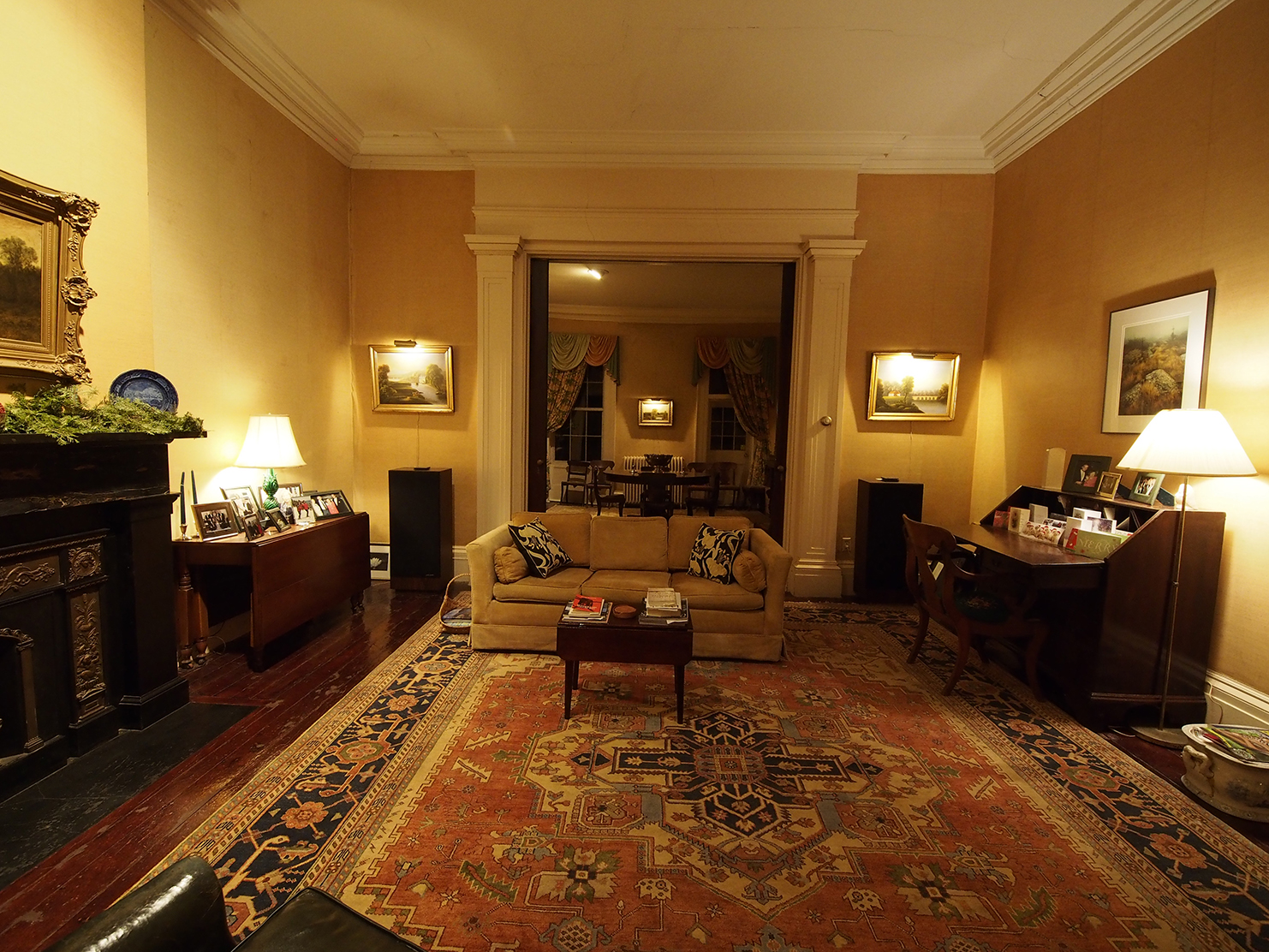
Living Room looking east to dining room, Patroon Agent's House

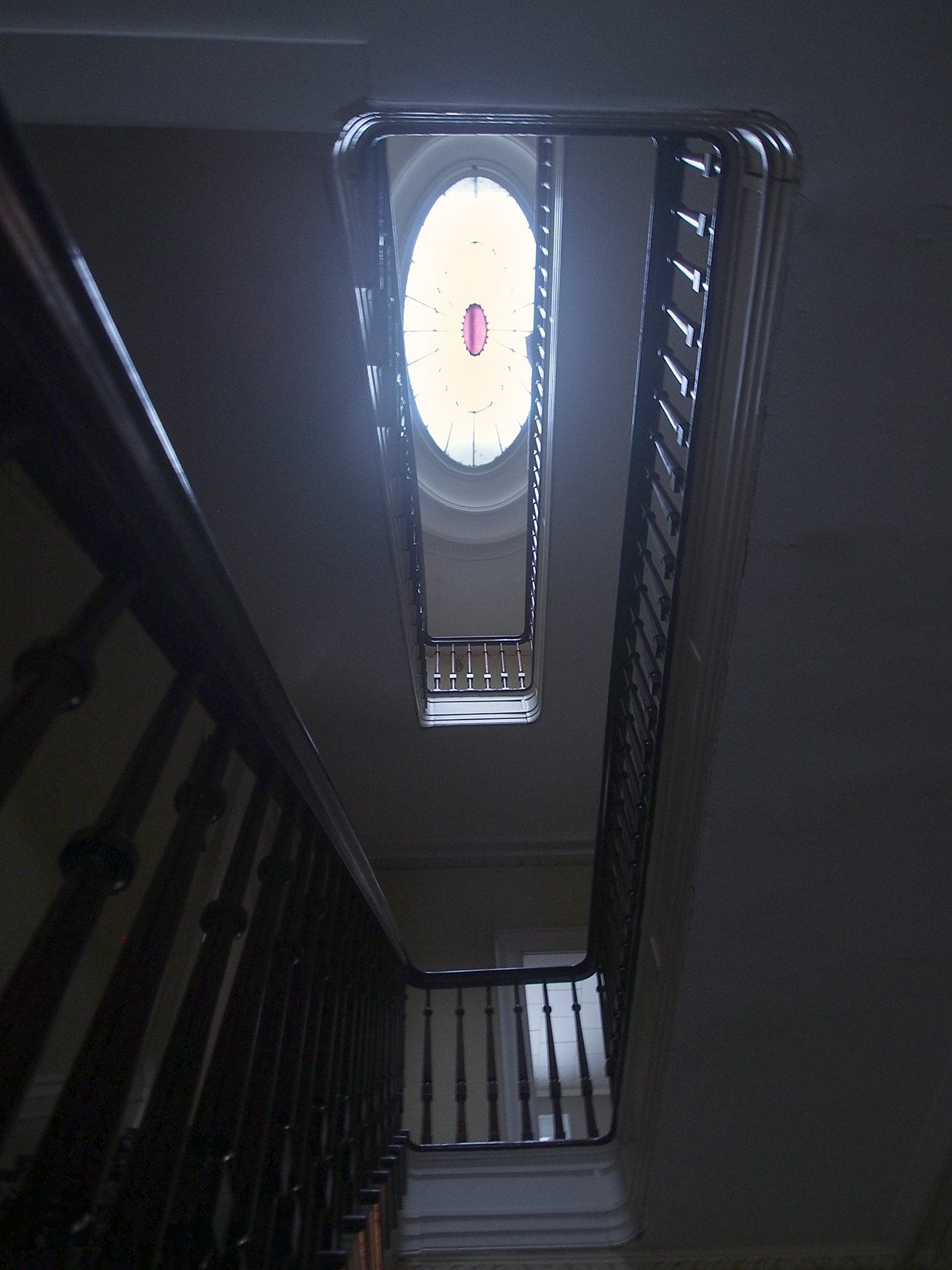
Oval oculus atop three-story center-hall staircase, Patroon Agent's House
