= Cullybackey =

Village in County Antrim, Northern Ireland

Coordinates: 54.8887°N 6.3470°W

Cullybackey: Irish: Coill na Baice
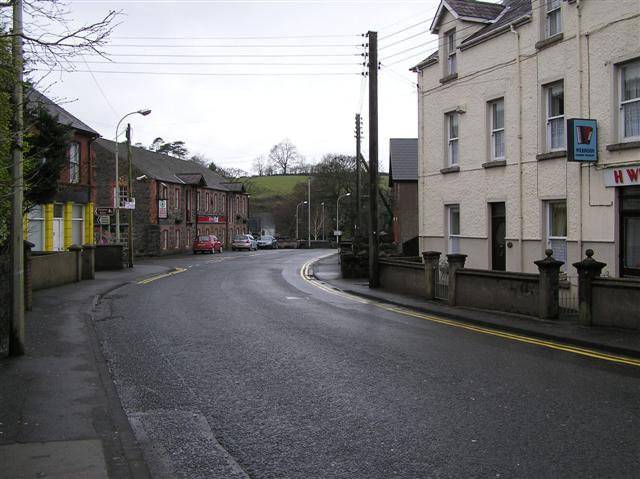
- Cullybackey Main Street

- Location within Northern Ireland
- Population: 2,614 (2021 census)
- District: Mid and East Antrim
- Country: Northern Ireland
- Sovereign state: United Kingdom
- Post town: Ballymena
- Postcode district: BT42
- Dialling code: 028
- Police: Northern Ireland
- Fire: Northern Ireland
- Ambulance: Northern Ireland
- UK Parliament: North Antrim
- NI Assembly: North Antrim

Cullybackey or Cullybacky (from Irish Coill na Baice 'wood of the river bend') is a large village in County Antrim, Northern Ireland. It lies 3 miles north-west of Ballymena, on the banks of the River Main, and is part of Mid and East Antrim district. It had a population of 2,614 people in the 2021 Census.

== History ==
Cullybackey was part of the ancient kingdom of Dál nAraidi. Evidence of ancient dwellers in the area have been found throughout the years, including the remains of Crannogs and Souterrains.

Christian Missionary Mackevet erected a monastery in the area. It is said that when Mackevet first approached the Irish Chieftain MacAfee about this matter the two began to argue over it and Mackevet, who was a large man raised his fist into the chieftains face and said "I'm a man of peace, but smell that MacAfee". This won him the argument and the monastery was built, supplying the area with a place of learning for many centuries afterwards.

In 1778 a Volunteers company was raised by John Dickey of Cullybackey House, They named themselves 'The Cullybackey Volunteers'.

In 1847, the village contained 235 residents and contained about 50 houses.

== Places of interest ==
- Arthur Cottage, the ancestral home of Chester A. Arthur, 21st President of the United States, from 1881 to 1885, is close to the village, on the B62 road from Ballymena. It is a restored 18th-century farmhouse with open flax-straw thatched roof. It is usually open to the public through the spring and summer months.
- The old Methodist church on the banks of the river was opened in 1839 as the Original Secession Church. It later became the United Free Church of Scotland. When the United Free clergy withdrew from Ireland in 1923, the congregation became Methodists.
- The Cuningham Memorial Presbyterian Church
- Craigs Church of Ireland, which was designed by celebrated 19th-century architect Sir Charles Lanyon and built in 1840. Attached to the church is a very old graveyard which contains 'The Strangers Plot', where the poor of the parish where buried, including those who lost their lives in the parish during the Great Famine (Ireland)
- Reformed Presbyterian Church (Covenanter)
- Cullybackey Millennium Riverwalk
- Craigdun Castle, a 19th-century Scottish baronial castle that is set a mile outside the village. Believed to have been designed by Charles Lanyon, it was left to the NHS as a home for multiple sclerosis sufferers in the 1950s and continued in this role until the 1990s, when it was sold by the NHS. The current owners have extensively renovated the property and gardens, and in 2011 the house was a finalist in the BBC Northern Ireland House of the Year programme.

== Transport ==
Translink run both trains and buses through the village daily.

The first sod on the Belfast railway line was turned in 1845 and the line from Ballymena to Portrush was completed in 1855 The railway line is still well used by the population of Cullybackey today with trains stopping at the station almost hourly throughout the day.

There are bus stops at both ends and in the middle of the Main Street. bus stops are dotted around the surrounding townlands.

== Sport ==
Local sports clubs include Cullybackey Blues Football Club.

== Education ==
Schools in the area include:

- Cullybackey College
- Buick Memorial Primary School
- The Diamond Primary School

== Demography ==
Cullybackey had a population of 2,569 people (1,088 households) in the 2011 census. Of these:

- 4.0% were from a Catholic background and 88.4% were from a Protestant background

In 2001, Cullybackey was classified as an "intermediate settlement" by the Northern Ireland Statistics and Research Agency (NISRA) (i.e., with population between 2,250 and 4,500 people). On census day 2001 (29 April 2001), there were 2,405 people living in Cullybackey. Of these:

- 19.5% were aged under 16 and 22.3% were aged 60 and over
- 47.1% of the population were male and 52.9% were female
- 1.2% were from a Catholic background and 97.0% were from a Protestant background
- 3.3% of people aged 16–74 were unemployed.

== Notable people ==
- Bruce Anstey, motorcycle racer
- William Arthur, Baptist minister and father of Chester A. Arthur, 21st President of the United States of America
- Steven Davis, Rangers and Northern Ireland footballer.
- Matilda Cullen Knowles, scientist, was born here in 1864.
- Jessica Kurten, Olympic horse rider and representative of Ireland.
- Neil 'Smutty' Robinson, a well-known motorcycle racer and British 250cc Championship winner, who was killed, aged 24, in 1986.
- Ella Young, Celtic poet, mythologist and Feminist activist was born here in 1867.

== See also ==
- List of villages in Northern Ireland
- List of towns in Northern Ireland
