= Newtonville, New York =

- Hamlet
- Location within New York Location within the United States
- Coordinates: 42°43′27″N 73°45′30″W
- Country: United States
- State: New York
- Region: Capital District
- County: Albany
- Town: Colonie
- Settled: 1840
- Named after: early settler John M. Newton
- Elevation: 367 ft (112 m)
- Time zone: UTC-5 (EST)
  - Summer (DST): UTC-4 (EDT)
- ZIP Codes: 12110; 12128 (PO box only)
- Area code: 518

Newtonville is a hamlet in the town of Colonie in Albany County, New York, United States. Located along U.S. Route 9, the hamlet is just south of Latham and north of Loudonville. Colonie Town Hall is located in the hamlet of Newtonville.

== History ==
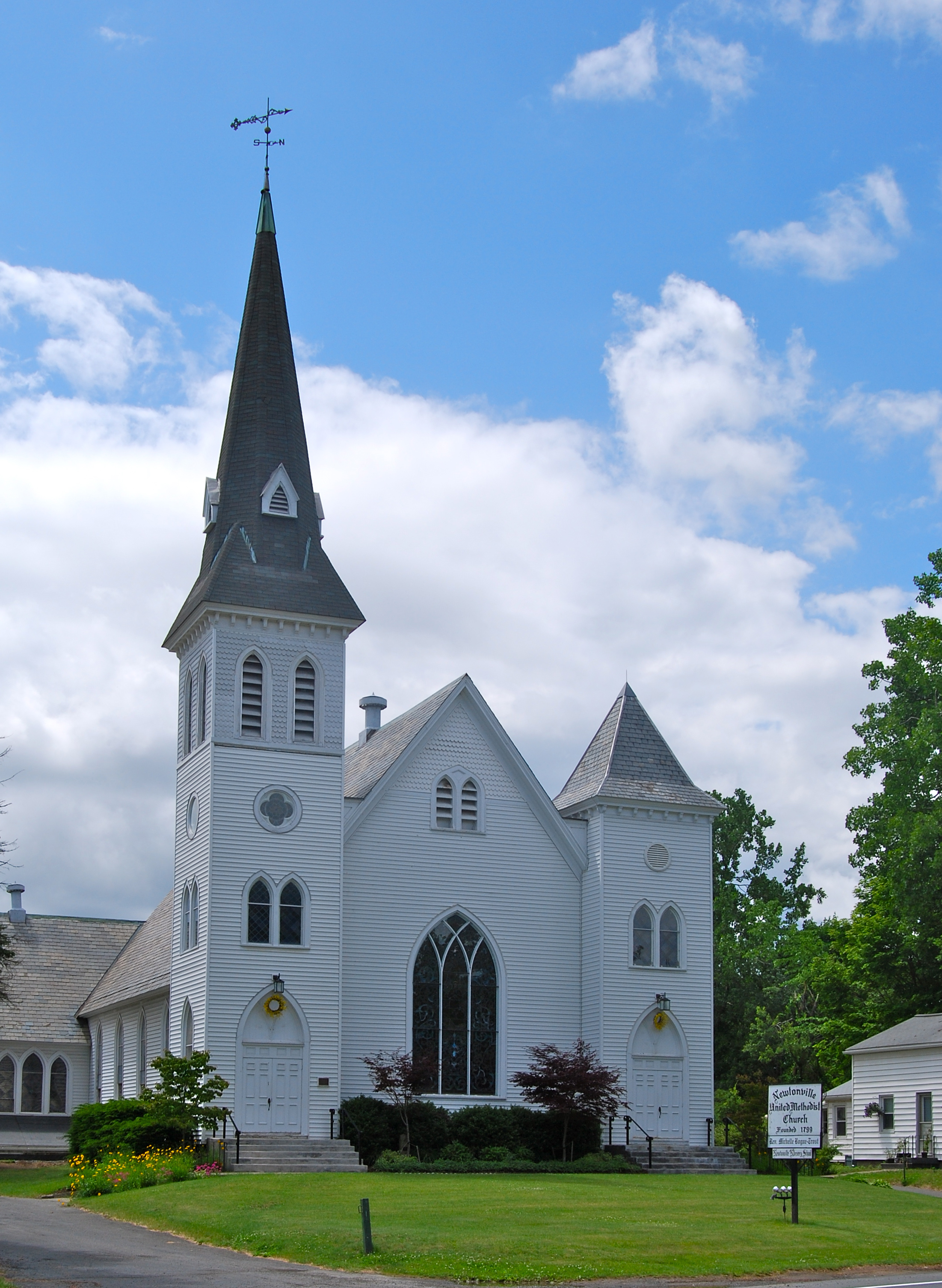
Newtonville United Methodist Church

Newtonville is named after John M. Newton, an early landowner, it was originally called Newton Corners. Mr. Newton was in the business of manufacturing bricks, ceramics, and stove linings. He built the First Baptist Church in 1852, today it is the Newtonville Post Office and is on the National Register of Historic Places. The first post office at Newtonville was established in 1850 and located in the store owned by John H. Kemp. On October 27, 1887 the Rev. Dr. William Arthur, father of President Chester A. Arthur, died in Newtonville. During the early 1900s Newtonville was a popular place in guide books catering to touring the countryside in early automobiles, such as- Scarborough's Official Tour Book (1918), Automotive Industries (1905), Albany Guide Book (1917), Automotive Blue Book (1921), Red Book: Interstate Automobile Guide, and the A.L.A. Green Book: Official Route Book (1920). In 1906 David Jeram began the Loudonville Autobus line with an 18 passenger Knox bus traveling between Latham's Corners and Albany with a stop at Newtonville. In 1987 the Buhrmaster Barn, built in the 1800s along the Mohawk River was moved to Newtonville at the site of the historical museum, the Pruyn House. In 1997 the Verdoy Schoolhouse was also moved to that location.

Along with the Newtonville Post Office, Casparus F. Pruyn House, and Verdoy Schoolhouse, the Newtonville School and Newtonville United Methodist Church are also listed on the National Register of Historic Places.

== Geography ==
Newtonville is centered on the intersection of Maxwell Road and US Route 9 (New Loudon Road). As a hamlet, its boundaries are indeterminate. Newtonville is generally determined to extend north on Route 9 to the intersection with Old Loudon Road, where the hamlet of Latham begins and west on Maxwell Road to include sections of Old Niskayuna Road.
