= Dudley Pond, Cochituate Massachusetts =

84-acre Great Pond in Cochituate, Massachusetts, U.S.

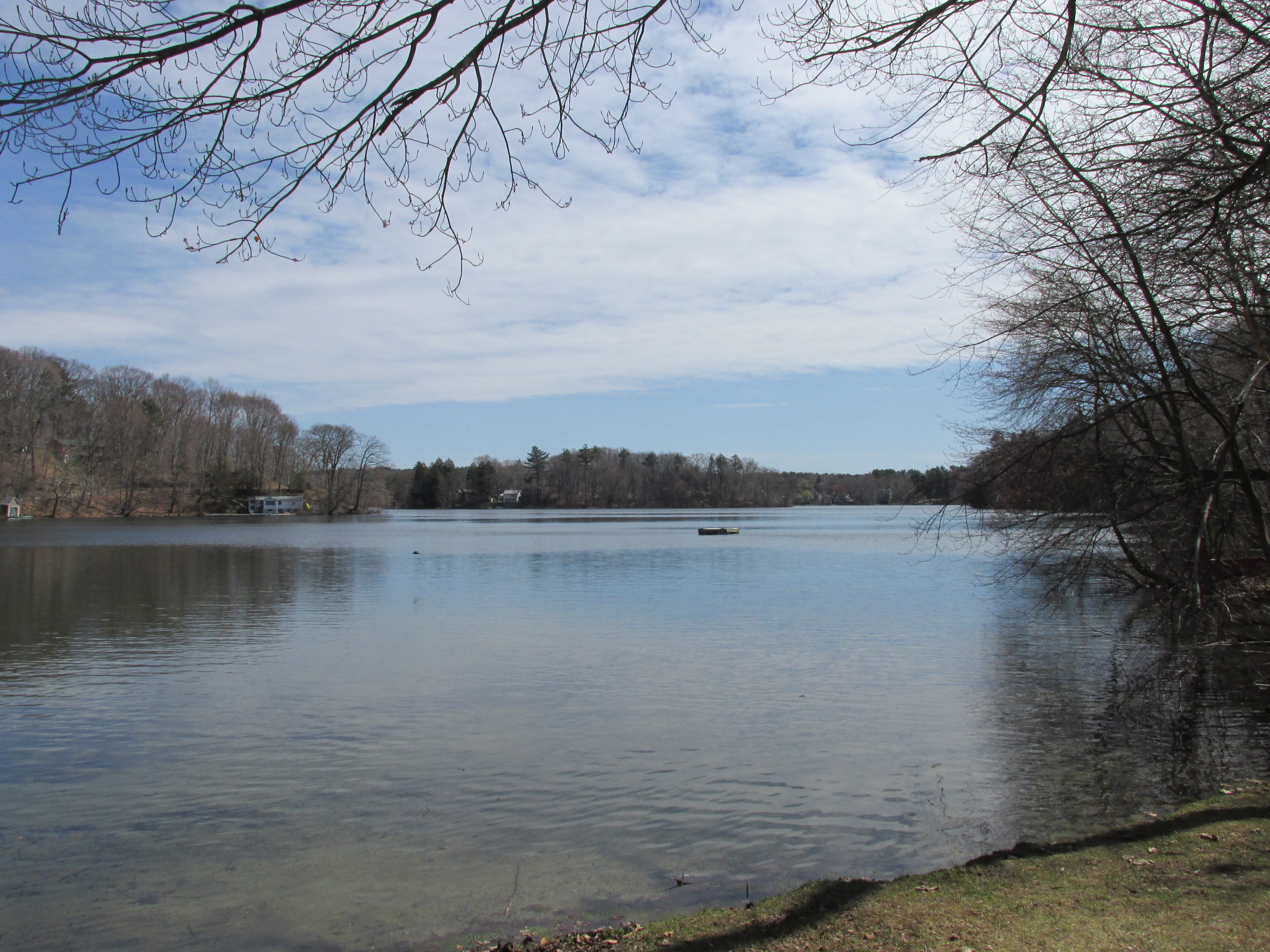
Dudley Pond

Dudley Pond is an 84-acre Great Pond in Cochituate, Massachusetts, United States. The pond is a shallow glacial landform fed primarily by rain.

Dudley Pond was used in the mid-1800s as a stand-by water source for Boston. At the time it was connected by pipe to the nearby and much larger Lake Cochituate. In the 1920s and '30s the pond became a center for nightlife and Prohibition-breaking, with a concomitant decline in habitat and sanitation. Efforts to restore the environment beginning in the mid-century returned the pond to a high standard of water quality.

More recently Dudley Pond has been primarily a vacation spot, residential area, and community recreation site. Notable residents of the pond area include the late Ted Williams and current resident George Howell. The pond currently has one eatery, The Dudley Chateau. Recreation activities include public fishing and boating.

The pond is owned by the Town of Wayland, on a long-term lease. Since 1968 its health and habitat have been monitored by the Dudley Pond Association, a non-profit corporation.
