= Wayland Center Historic District =

Historic district in Massachusetts, United States

- U.S. National Register of Historic Places
- U.S. Historic district
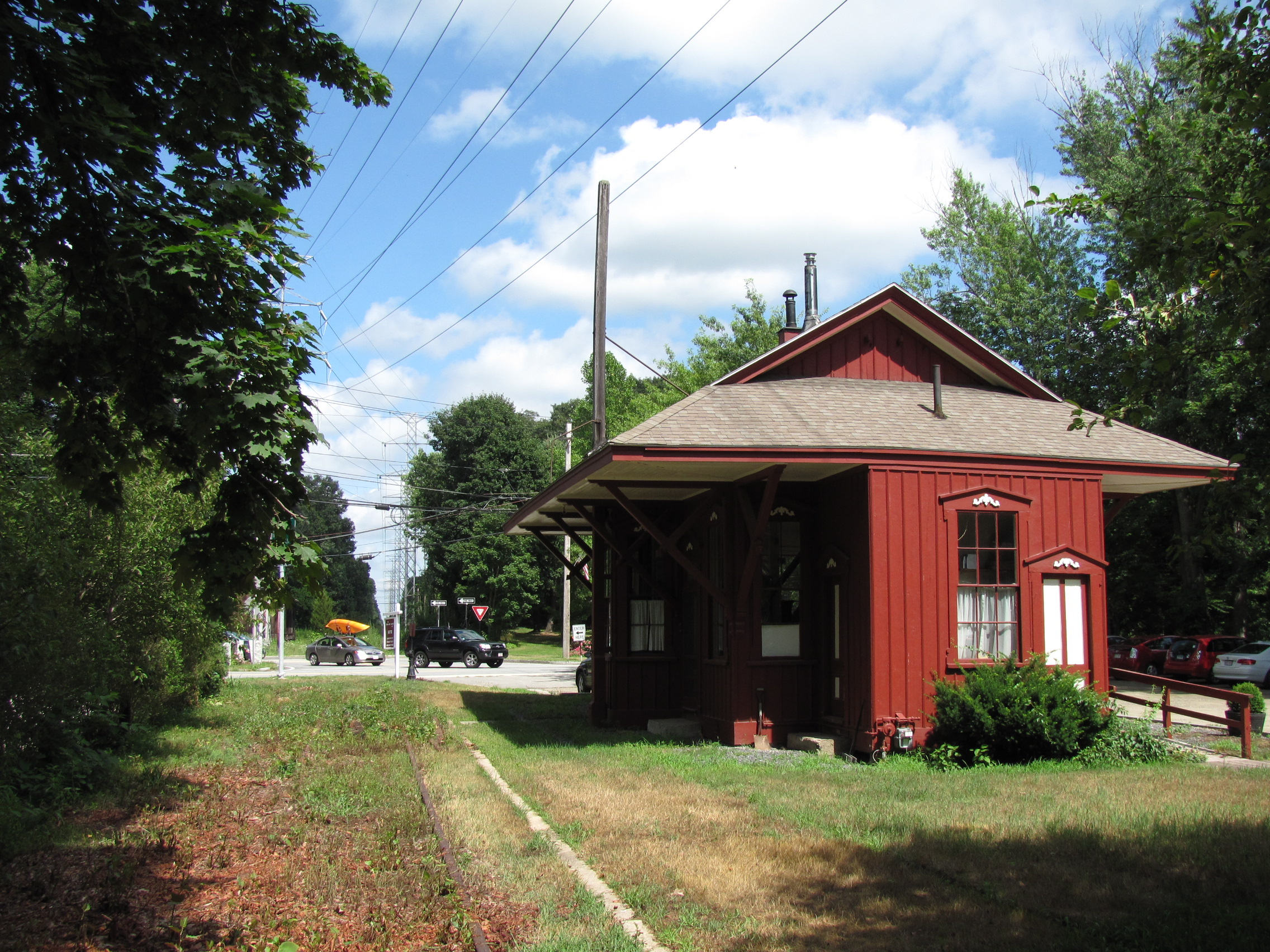
- Wayland Depot 1881

- Location within Massachusetts Location within the United States
- Location: Wayland, Massachusetts
- Coordinates: 42°21′49″N 71°21′35″W
- Area: 21 acres (8.5 ha)
- Architect: Multiple
- Architectural style: Colonial Revival, Greek Revival, Federal
- NRHP reference No.: 74000378
- Added to NRHP: September 6, 1974

The Wayland Center Historic District encompasses the predominantly 19th-century village center of Wayland, Massachusetts. Located at the junction of United States Route 20 and Cochituate Road (Massachusetts Route 27), it includes fifteen well-preserved 19th-century buildings that form one of the best-preserved village centers of that period near Boston. It was added to the National Register of Historic Places in 1974.

== Description and history ==
The town of Wayland was settled in the 17th century as part of Sudbury, and was incorporated as East Sudbury in 1780, and renamed Wayland in 1835. The present village center took shape beginning in 1814–15, when after much controversy, it was chosen as the site of the new town meetinghouse, replacing the town's 1726 meetinghouse. That new building still stands today, forming the visual centerpiece of the center at the southeast corner of the junction of Routes 20 and 27. Material from the 1726 building was recycled for construction of a new town hall, which was converted into a residence in 1888. Both of these buildings are fine Federal period structures; the church bell was provided by the firm of Paul Revere. The present town hall, located across the street from the 1815 one, is a Georgian Revival building constructed in 1957 on the site of the 1887 town hall; it is the only 20th-century structure in the district.

The historic district is centered at the junction of Routes 20 and 27, and extends north and south along Route 27 (Cochituate Road). It includes sixteen buildings, which are a mix of residential and civic buildings, and include two 19th-century barns. Most of these buildings are one or two stories in height, and of wood-frame construction; the current town hall is the only non-wood building. Most of them were built before 1850, and are either Federal or Greek Revival in style. The most notable exceptions are the 1881 train station, which helped transform Wayland into a commuter suburb of Boston, and the 1897 former post office building, which is Colonial Revival in style.

== See also ==
- National Register of Historic Places listings in Middlesex County, Massachusetts
