= Richard Falley Jr. =

American soldier (1740–1808)

- Born: January 31, 1740; St. George, Province of Massachusetts Bay, British America (now St. George, Maine, U.S.)
- Died: September 3, 1808 (aged 68); Westfield, Massachusetts, U.S.
- Spouse: Margaret Hitchcock
- Children: 11
- Relatives: Richard Falley Cleveland (grandson); Lewis Falley Allen (grandson); Grover Cleveland (great-grandson); Rose Cleveland (great-granddaughter); Ruth Cleveland (great-great-granddaughter); Esther Cleveland Bosanquet (great-great-granddaughter); Richard Folsom Cleveland (great-great-grandson); Francis Grover Cleveland (great-great-grandson); Philippa Foot (great-great-great-granddaughter)

Richard Falley Jr. (January 31, 1740 – September 3, 1808) was a soldier who fought in the Battle of Bunker Hill.

== Early life ==
Falley was born on January 31, 1740, in St. George, Maine. He was the son of Richard and Anna (Lamb) Falley. His father was born on Guernsey, but was reputedly kidnapped as a boy and brought to Nova Scotia.

== Career ==
At age 16, Falley joined the Provincial Army and was among those captured by Native Americans at the surrender of Fort Edward. He was taken to Montreal and adopted into the tribe. Later he was ransomed from the tribe by a woman for 16 gallons of rum and returned to Westfield. He later joined Captain Park’s company as an ensign and commanded a company at the Battle of Bunker Hill where his 14-year-old son, Frederick, served there as a drummer, and reportedly "drummed all through the fight." During the American Revolution, Falley made guns for the Continental Army at an armory at the foot of Tekoa Mountain in Montgomery, Massachusetts. For many years he supported the Arsenal as Master Armorer and later the Armory at Springfield, Massachusetts.

On May 27, 1775 after the Battles of Lexington and Concord Falley was appointed as Massachusetts Armorer on order of the Provincial Congress [1]. In 1777 George Washington with the suggestion of Henry Knox established an arsenal in Springfield, Massachusetts to store muskets, cannon, and other weapons. Falley witnessed the surrender of British General John Burgoynea and Hessian General Friedrich von Adolf Riedesel Continental Army to American General Horatio Gates after The Battles of Saratoga on October 17, 1777. On December 8, 1798 Falley was awarded a contract to produce 1,000 Charleville type pattern muskets for the Springfield Armory in Springfield, Massachusetts

=== Personal life ===
On December 24, 1761, Falley married Margaret Hitchcock (b. May 25, 1741, Westfield, MA - d. February 11 or 18, 1820, Volney (now Fulton), NY) in Westfield, Massachusetts. Together they had 11 children, 10 of whom survived.

1. Lovisa Falley, b. Dec 3, 1763
2. Frederick Falley, b. Jan 2, 1765
3. Margaret Falley, b. Nov 15, 1766
4. Richard Falley III, b. Sept 15, 1768
5. Russell Falley, b. Oct 5, 1770
6. Daniel Falley, b. Dec 3, 1772 (did not survive)
7. Daniel Falley, b. Nov 15, 1773
8. Ruth Falley, b. Dec 7, 1775
9. Lewis Falley, b. Jan 15, 1778
10. Samuel Falley, b. Oct 9, 1780
11. Alexander Falley, b. Apr 4, 1783

== Death and legacy ==
Falley died on September 3, 1808, in Westfield, Massachusetts. He was buried at the Old Burying Grounds off of Mechanic Street in Westfield.

Through his daughter Margaret, Falley was the grandfather of Richard Falley Cleveland, who was the father of Grover Cleveland (twice President of the United States).

Falley Drive in Westfield, Massachusetts, is named for him.

== Bibliography ==
`Madison, Robert R. (2022). Biography of Lt. Richard Falley, Jr.: General Washington’s Secret Armory. Silver Street Media. ISBN 9781542206877.
