= Richard Falley Cleveland =

American minister, father of Grover Cleveland (1804–1853)

The Reverend Richard Falley Cleveland
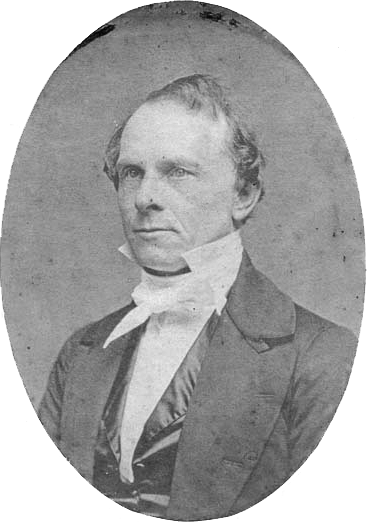
- Born: June 19, 1804; Norwich, Connecticut, U.S.
- Died: October 1, 1853 (aged 49)
- Education: Yale College; Princeton Theological Seminary
- Occupation: Congregationalist/Presbyterian minister
- Spouse: Ann Neal (m. 1829)
- Children: 9, including Grover and Rose
- Relatives: Richard Falley Jr. (grandfather); Lewis Falley Allen (cousin); Ruth Cleveland (granddaughter); Esther Cleveland Bosanquet (granddaughter); Richard Folsom Cleveland (grandson); Francis Grover Cleveland (grandson); Philippa Foot (great-granddaughter)

Richard Falley Cleveland (June 19, 1804 – October 1, 1853) was an American Congregationalist and Presbyterian minister. A graduate of Yale College and Princeton Theological Seminary, Cleveland spent most of his life as a pastor, outside of a brief period as a district secretary for the American Home Missionary Society. He was the father of Grover Cleveland, who served as President of the United States twice.

== Early life ==
Cleveland was born into an old-stock American family in Norwich, Connecticut, the son of Margaret (née Falley) and William Cleveland (a watchmaker by profession). His maternal grandfather, Richard Falley Jr., fought in the Battle of Bunker Hill. Cleveland's parents reputedly decided at his birth that their son would become a minister. Described as a "thin, pale, and intelligent boy" by Allan Nevins, he worked for periods at an uncle's cotton mill and as a store clerk before winning acceptance into Yale College. He graduated summa cum laude in 1824, and almost immediately moved to Baltimore, Maryland, where he began working as a teacher in a private school. At the same time, he began his advanced theological studies, initially under a local minister and later for a brief period at the Princeton Theological Seminary in New Jersey.

== Ministry ==
On October 18, 1829, Cleveland was ordained as a minister in the Congregational Church. His first appointment led him back to his home state, as the pastor of the First Congregational Church in Windham, Connecticut. His tenure there was not overly successful – the parishioners chided his wife for her colorful clothing and jewelry and were scornful of their decision to bring an African-American woman with them from Maryland as a maid. Cleveland and his family left Connecticut in 1833 and secured an appointment as acting minister of a Presbyterian church in Portsmouth, Virginia.

In November 1834, Cleveland moved to a pastorate in Caldwell, New Jersey. The church was remodelled and repaired and added 109 members in around five years. Cleveland then moved to Fayetteville, New York, remaining there until 1850 when he took up a position as district secretary for the American Home Missionary Society. This necessitated a move to Clinton, New York. He enjoyed the position, but the frequent travel over poorly maintained roads took a toll on his health, aggravating a gastric ulcer that he had developed. Cleveland sought a return to the easier life of a pastor, and in September 1853 found an appointment at a Presbyterian church in Holland Patent, New York. He preached only a single sermon there, dying the following month at the age of 49.

== Marriage and family ==
In Baltimore, Cleveland began courting Ann Neal, the daughter of a well-to-do bookseller. They married on September 10, 1829, and eventually had nine children together, born in several different states. Cleveland had his family live a frugal and inextravagant lifestyle, motivated by religious piety and also by his meager salary (never more than $1,000 per year). He was a strict Sabbath keeper, requiring his children to devote the entirety of Sundays to worship and prayer. At the time of Cleveland's death, seven children were still living at home. The Holland Patent congregation came to the family's aid by buying the house they lived in, and allowing them to live there free of charge.

Cleveland's fifth son, Grover Cleveland, became the 22nd and 24th President of the United States and the first U.S. president to serve twice. He was 16 years old at the time of his father's death and reputedly learned of the event from a boy hawking newspapers. Grover Cleveland spoke highly of his father in later life, praising his godliness and devotion to family, and named one of his sons (Richard F. Cleveland) after him. His sister Rose (the family's youngest child) acted as First Lady for the first year or so of his presidency, sometimes assisted by her sister, Mary Hoyt, before his marriage to Frances Folsom.

== See also ==
- Moses Cleaveland - distant cousin
