= Francis Cleveland =

American actor and politician (1903-1995)

- Born: Francis Grover Cleveland; July 18, 1903; Buzzards Bay, Massachusetts, U.S.
- Died: November 8, 1995 (aged 92); Wolfeboro, New Hampshire, U.S.
- Education: Phillips Exeter Academy
- Alma mater: Harvard College
- Occupations: Actor, director, producer
- Known for: Co-founder of The Barnstormers Theatre
- Political party: Republican (1950–1962); Democratic (at time of death)
- Spouse: Alice Erdman
- Children: 1
- Parent(s): Grover Cleveland and Frances Cleveland
- Relatives: Richard Falley Cleveland (grandfather); Rose Cleveland (aunt); Richard F. Cleveland (brother); Ruth Cleveland (sister); Esther Cleveland (sister); Philippa Foot (niece)

Francis Grover Cleveland (July 18, 1903 – November 8, 1995) was an American stage actor, director, producer and politician. He was the co-founder of The Barnstormers Theatre, a theatre company in Tamworth, New Hampshire. His parents were President Grover Cleveland and First Lady Frances Folsom.

== Early life ==
Cleveland was born in 1903 in Buzzards Bay, Massachusetts, a part of the town of Bourne. His father, Grover Cleveland, had served as the 22nd and 24th President of the United States, having been in office 1885–1889 and 1893–1897. His mother, Frances Cleveland (née Folsom), had been First Lady. He had a brother, Richard, and three sisters; Ruth, Marion and Esther. As Grover Cleveland was 66 years old when Francis was born, Francis was alive a century after his father had first served as president. In a 1987 interview, Francis Cleveland stated that he had never visited the White House.

Cleveland was educated at Phillips Exeter Academy in New Hampshire and Harvard College (he did not graduate) in Massachusetts.

== Career ==
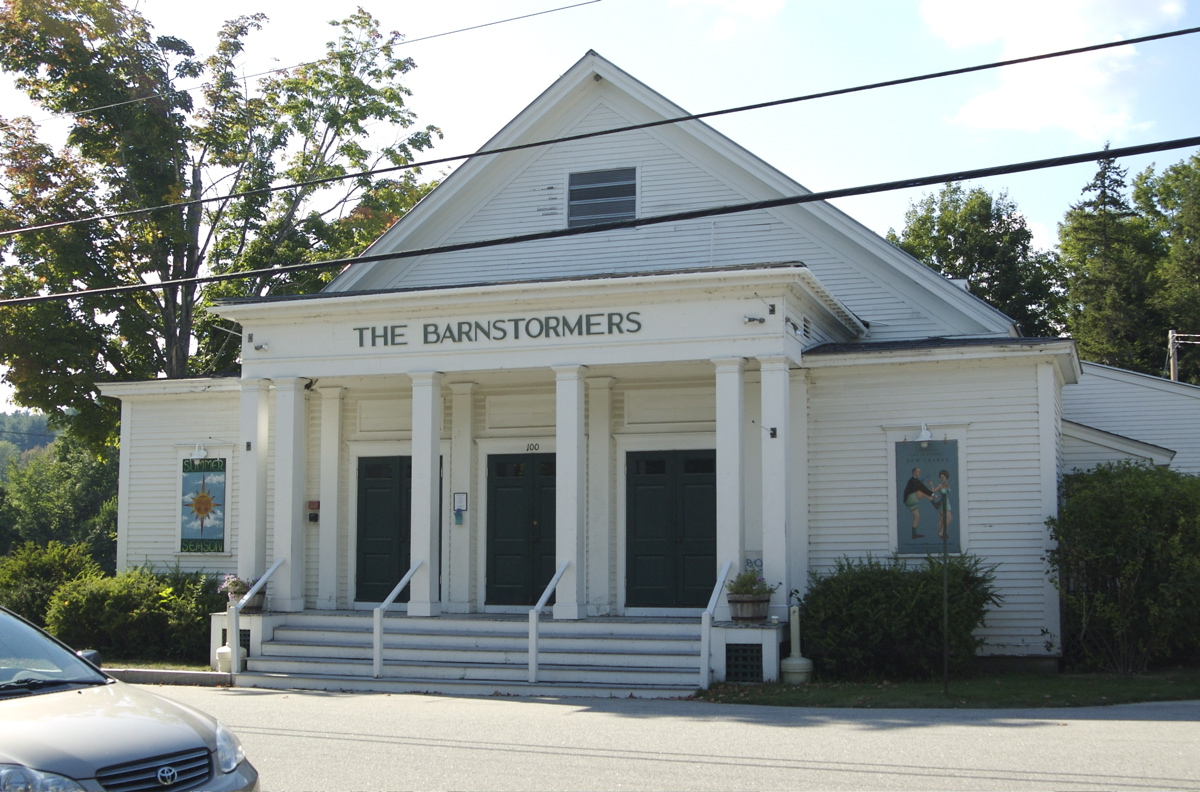
The Barnstormers Theatre in Tamworth, New Hampshire

Cleveland was a stage actor in New York City for seven years. He appeared in various performances including Dead End by Sidney Kingsley and Our Town (as Sam Craig) by Thornton Wilder on Broadway. With his wife Alice, and his producer Edward P. Goodnow, Cleveland co-founded The Barnstormers Theatre, a theatre company in Tamworth, New Hampshire, in 1931.

After first performing in a barn behind the Tamworth Inn (along with "barnstorming" in other local communities), in 1935 his mother bought a store in Tamworth, and in 1936 the group began performing in a theater constructed in the back of that building. It remained the group's home stage for the remainder of Cleveland's life. Cleveland directed plays for the company, and selected the plays they performed, which he estimated to have been more than 400 in number by 1993.

Cleveland was elected to serve on the board of selectmen of Tamworth in 1950. Running as a member of the Republican Party upon the advice of a friend, owing to local political leanings, he served until 1962.

== Personal life and death ==
Cleveland married Alice Erdman in 1925. They resided in Tamworth, New Hampshire. They had a daughter, Marion C. Cohen, who lived in Baltimore. Cleveland was predeceased by his wife in 1992.

In 1989, Cleveland was honored with a Granite State Award, which recognizes significant contributions to the state of New Hampshire, by Plymouth State College.

In his later years, Cleveland was affected by a degenerative eye disease, and was legally blind by 1993. He died on November 8, 1995, in Wolfeboro, New Hampshire, at age 92. He was the last surviving child of Grover Cleveland.

== See also ==
- New Hampshire historical marker no. 90: First Summer Playhouse
