= Richard Cleveland =

Richard Cleveland may refer to:

- Richard Falley Cleveland (1804–1853), father of Grover Cleveland, president of the United States
- Richard F. Cleveland (1897–1974), son of Grover Cleveland, president of the United States
