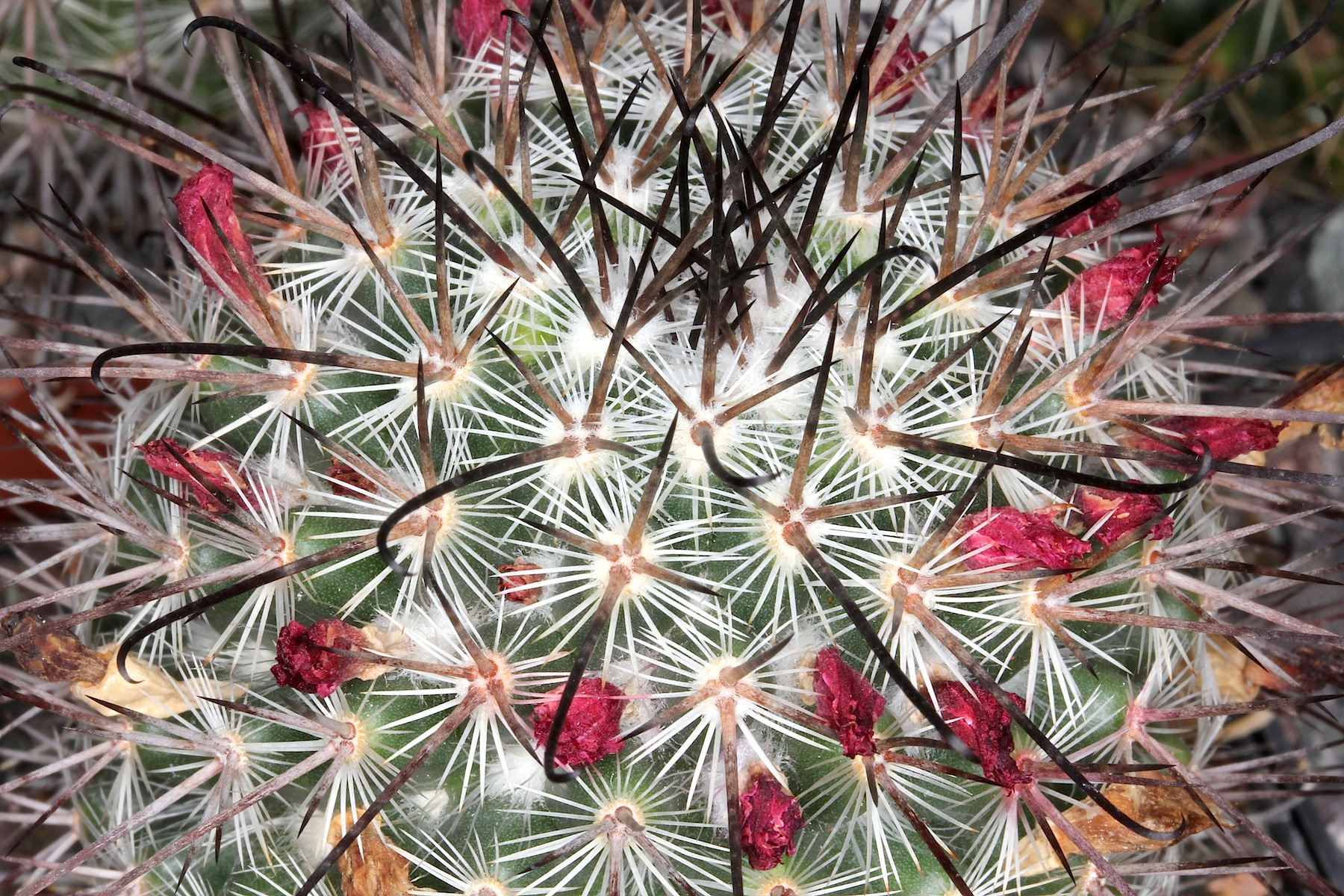

Conservation status
- Least Concern (IUCN 3.1)
- CITES Appendix II (CITES)

Scientific classification
- Kingdom: Plantae
- Clade: Tracheophytes
- Clade: Angiosperms
- Clade: Eudicots
- Order: Caryophyllales
- Family: Cactaceae
- Subfamily: Cactoideae
- Genus: Mammillaria
- Species: M. rekoi

Binomial name
- Mammillaria rekoi (Britton & Rose) Vaupel

Subspecies
- See text.

Synonyms
- Ebnerella rekoi (Britton & Rose) Buxb.; Mammillaria rekoiana R.T.Craig, nom. superfl.; Neomammillaria rekoi Britton & Rose

= Mammillaria rekoi =

Species of cactus

Mammillaria rekoi is a species of cactus endemic to Mexico.

== Distribution and habitat ==
Mammillaria rekoi is found only in central and northern Oaxaca, Mexico. It grows in oak forests on basalt, limestone cliffs, and clay soils at altitudes of 700–3,000 m (2,300–9,800 ft) above sea level.

== Description ==
Mammillaria rekoi has green stems that are either globe-shaped or somewhat cylindrical, growing up to 15 cm (5.9 in) tall with a diameter of 5–6 cm (2.0–2.4 in). The stems may be solitary or form clumps. The 4–7 central spines of the areoles are 10–15 mm (0.4–0.6 in) long, hooked or straight, and much stouter than the 20–30 radial spines which are 4–6 mm (0.16–0.24 in) long. The flowers are purple-pink to pink with darker midveins and are up to 15 mm (0.6 in) long. The ripe fruits are red with brown seeds.

== Taxonomy ==
The species was first described by Nathaniel Lord Britton and Joseph Nelson Rose in 1923 as Neomammillaria rekoi. Friedrich Vaupel transferred it to Mammillaria in 1925.

=== Subspecies ===
Three subspecies are recognized:

- Mammillaria rekoi subsp. aureispina (A.B.Lau) D.R.Hunt – 5–7 straight central spines and 20–23 golden yellow radial spines; usually solitary
- Mammillaria rekoi subsp. leptacantha (A.B.Lau) D.R.Hunt – 4–6 curved and hooked central spines and 27–30 radial spines; often in clumps of up to seven stems
- Mammillaria rekoi subsp. rekoi – 4 central spines, the lower one hooked, and about 20 white radial spines
