= Wedding of Grover Cleveland and Frances Folsom =

1886 American presidential wedding

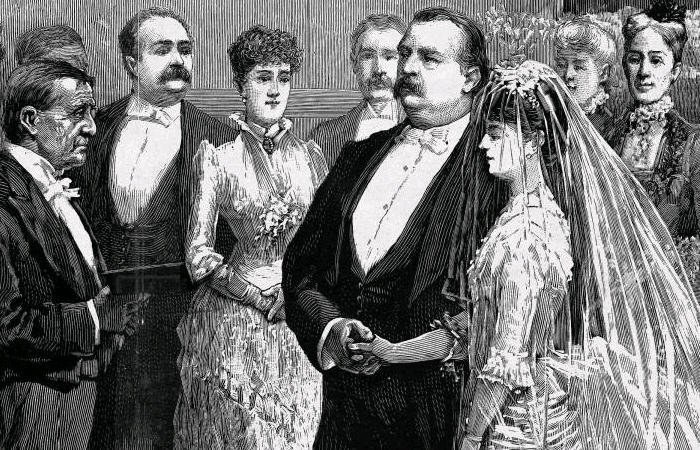
- Sketch by Thure de Thulstrup in Harper's Weekly
- Date: June 2, 1886; 140 years ago
- Venue: Blue Room of the White House
- Location: Washington, D.C., United States
- Participants: Grover Cleveland; Frances Folsom

The wedding of President Grover Cleveland and his bride Frances Folsom took place on June 2, 1886, in the Blue Room of the White House. Cleveland is the second U.S. president to marry whilst in office, after John Tyler's 1844 remarriage to Julia Gardiner, and remains the only U.S. president to marry at the White House. The wedding was highly publicized, though only close associates of the bride and groom were permitted to attend the ceremony. However, a reception was held as a public event one week after the ceremony.

== Background ==
Cleveland, born in 1837, was the law partner of Folsom's father, Oscar Folsom, and a close family friend. They first met when Folsom, born in 1864, was an infant while Cleveland was already an adult. In 1875, Folsom's father died in a buggy accident, and Cleveland was appointed the executor of his estate and became her unofficial guardian. He maintained a close relationship with her while she was in school while he became Governor of New York and then President of the United States. When Cleveland was inaugurated as president, he was still a bachelor. He had previously indicated a desire not to marry, and a White House wedding seemed unlikely. Media speculation was pervasive, and a Miss Van Vechten was considered the most likely bride-to-be, though little else about her is known.

While in college, Folsom became engaged twice, though neither engagement resulted in marriage. She expressed to her mother her desire to marry an older man. Cleveland and Folsom began a courtship. He proposed to her shortly after, asking, "Would you put your life in my hands?" The engagement was kept secret from the press, and Folsom vacationed in Europe with her mother for several months. Rumors of their engagement were initially dismissed as gossip, for speculation of the president's love life was common. Popular gossip had considered Folsom's mother to be a more likely object of Cleveland's attentions. Cleveland found this frustrating, wondering why speculation paired him with "old ladies".

Folsom returned to New York City on May 27. Cleveland took a train to meet her on May 30. Cleveland participated in a Memorial Day parade while in New York, and the president's engagement was celebrated; the band played the "Wedding March", "He's Going to Marry Yum-Yum", and "Come Where My Love Lies Dreaming". As Folsom looked on the parade, Cleveland tipped his hat to her. She waved, much to the appreciation of the crowd. Both avoided further public attention in the days leading up to the wedding, with Cleveland staying at a country home and Folsom secluded in New York. On June 1, Folsom and her mother took a train to Washington, D.C. Newspapers covered the days leading up to the wedding in great detail, sometimes running multiple stories on the wedding every day, covering every detail of the wedding's preparation. At the time of the wedding, Grover Cleveland was 49 years old, and Frances Folsom was 21 years old.

== Ceremony ==
Cleveland had little interest in an elaborate wedding, but Folsom insisted on a grand event. He and his sister Rose Cleveland personally organized the event at the White House. The wedding was attended by close family and friends as well as members of the Cabinet of the United States. In total, only 31 people attended the June 2, 1886 ceremony itself. The press was expressly forbidden from attending the ceremony, though reporters were allowed to see the decorations before the area was closed off. Hundreds of spectators gathered around the White House as the guests arrived.

The Blue Room was redecorated to serve as the venue for the wedding ceremony. It was decorated with numerous flowers and other houseplants, including begonias, azaleas, camellias, pansies, ferns, roses, and palms. The wedding's date was inscribed in the flower bed, written out in an arrangement of white pansies, and the initials "CF" were written with white roses. The fireplace was filled with flowers in the colors of a fire. The phrase "e pluribus unum" was written on a scroll above the main doorway. The East Room was decorated with palms, ferns, azaleas, and hydrangeas.

Folsom was supposed to be walked down the aisle by her grandfather, and the wedding was intended to take place at his farm, but he had died shortly before her return to the United States. Instead, Cleveland himself led her down the aisle. They went down the aisle at 6:30 pm, walking down the Grand Staircase and across the hall into the Blue Room. Cleveland had the ceremony shortened, and he ensured that the word "obey" had been removed from the bride's marriage vows, replacing it with "keep". John Philip Sousa led the Marine Band in a rendition of the "Wedding March". The ceremony was officiated by two ministers: Byron Sunderland of the First Presbyterian Church, and Cleveland's brother William. The wedding ring was inscribed with the date. The guests stood in a semicircle behind the bride and groom. The ceremony lasted a total of ten minutes. At its end, the city went into celebration with the ringing of bells and blowing of ships' horns. A 21-gun salute was also performed.

On the day of their wedding, Cleveland was 49, and Folsom was 21. Their wedding was the only time that a sitting president was married in the White House. Supper was held in the East Room. The centerpiece was a model ship made of flowers, flying the national colors and flags bearing the initials "CF". Slices of wedding cake were given to the guests in individual satin boxes with cards signed by the bride and groom.

=== Ceremony guests ===
Cleveland wished for the ceremony to be a private affair, and only a select few attended:

- Emma Folsom – The bride's mother
- William Cleveland – Reverend and the groom's brother
- Mary Allen Cleveland Hoyt – The groom's sister
- Rose Cleveland – The groom's sister
- Thomas F. Bayard – Secretary of State
- Daniel Manning – Secretary of the Treasury
- Mary Manning – Secretary of the Treasury's wife
- William Crowninshield Endicott – Secretary of War
- Ellen Endicott – Secretary of War's wife
- William Collins Whitney – Secretary of the Navy
- Flora Payne Whitney – Secretary of the Navy's wife
- William Freeman Vilas – Postmaster General
- Anna Vilas – Postmaster General's wife
- Lucius Quintus Cincinnatus Lamar – Secretary of the Interior
- Daniel S. Lamont – Private Secretary to the President
- Juliet Lamont – Private Secretary's wife
- Benjamin Folsom – The bride's cousin
- Mr. Rogers
- Mrs. Rogers
- Mrs. Cadman
- Ms. Huddleston
- Mr. Harmon
- Mrs. Harmon
- Ms. Nelson
- Wilson S. Bissell – The groom's friend
- Byron Sunderland – Officiant
- Mary Elizabeth Tomlinson Sunderland – Officiant's wife
- Julia Severance – The bride's friend

Attorney General Augustus Hill Garland was invited to the wedding but ultimately did not attend.

== Honeymoon and reception ==
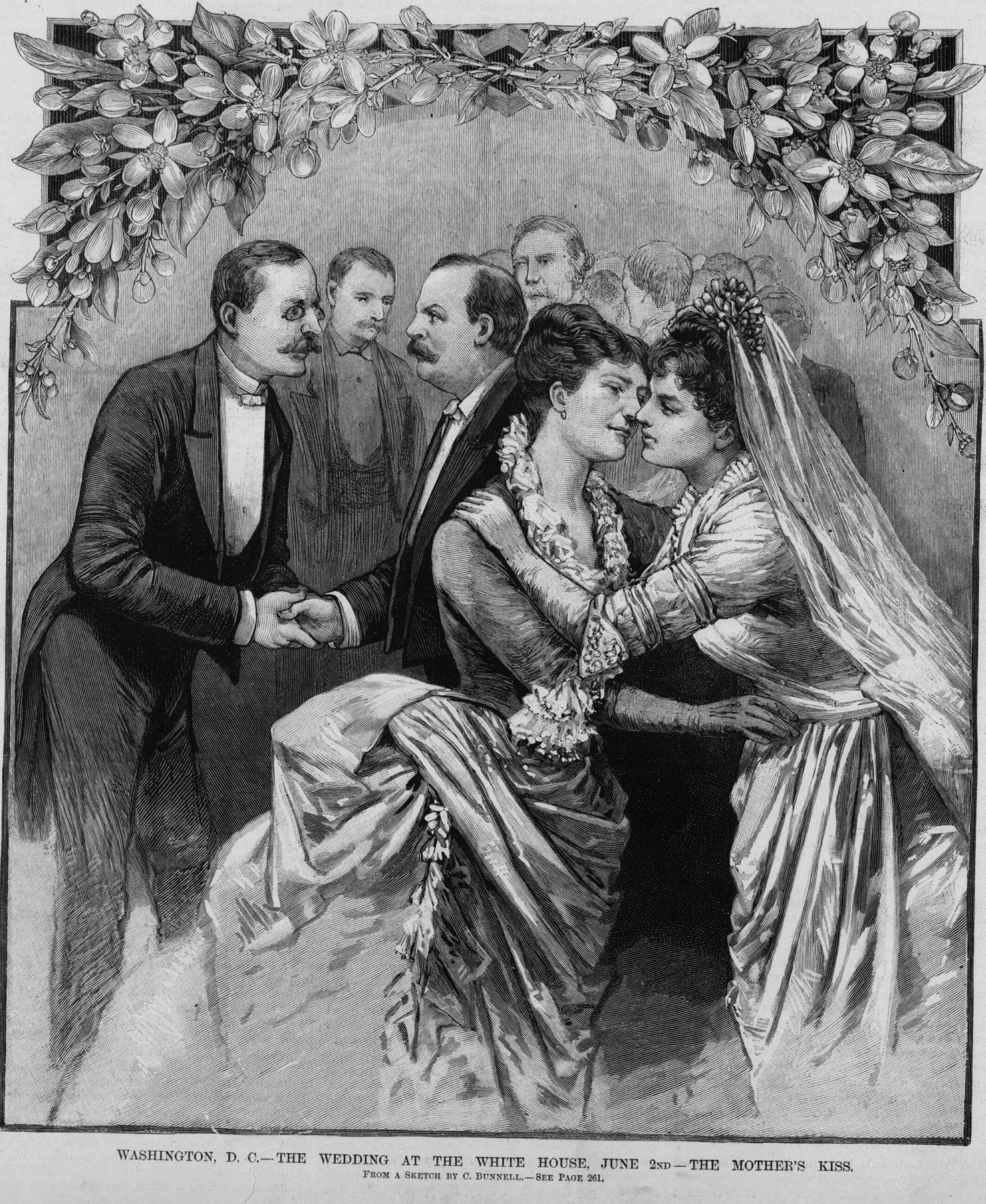
Sketch by C. Bunnell in Frank Leslie's Illustrated Newspaper

That night, the newlyweds left the White House to take a private train to their honeymoon in Deer Park, Maryland. The resort was not typically open in June, limiting public attention to the president and the new first lady. A large crowd of admirers awaited them as they left the White House, and the Marine Band played as they made their way out. They honeymooned for one week, followed by reporters, and received little privacy. The house's guard also turned away many admirers. Despite the considerable attention, no significant interruptions took place during the honeymoon.

After returning to Washington the following week, the Clevelands held two receptions at the White House: one for the diplomatic corps and another for the general public. During these receptions, Frances wore her wedding dress, her sapphire-diamond engagement ring, and her diamond necklace, which she had received as a wedding present from her husband. The White House was decorated in the same style and fashion as the wedding. The receptions were well received by the press.

The first reception was held on June 15 for the diplomatic corps, and its organization was the first duty carried out by Frances Cleveland as first lady. Prince August Leopold of Brazil was also in attendance. After the diplomatic corps, the judiciary, members of Congress, military officers, and executive officials were invited to pay their respects to the newlyweds. The second reception was held on June 18 for the public. A line of people waited by the White House an hour before the event began, with thousands attending. Security guards ushered the crowd through as the Clevelands greeted members of the crowd. More informal receptions were held on June 22, June 24, June 29, July 1, and July 8. A dinner was also hosted on June 24 by Secretary William Collins Whitney in honor of the couple.

== Attire ==
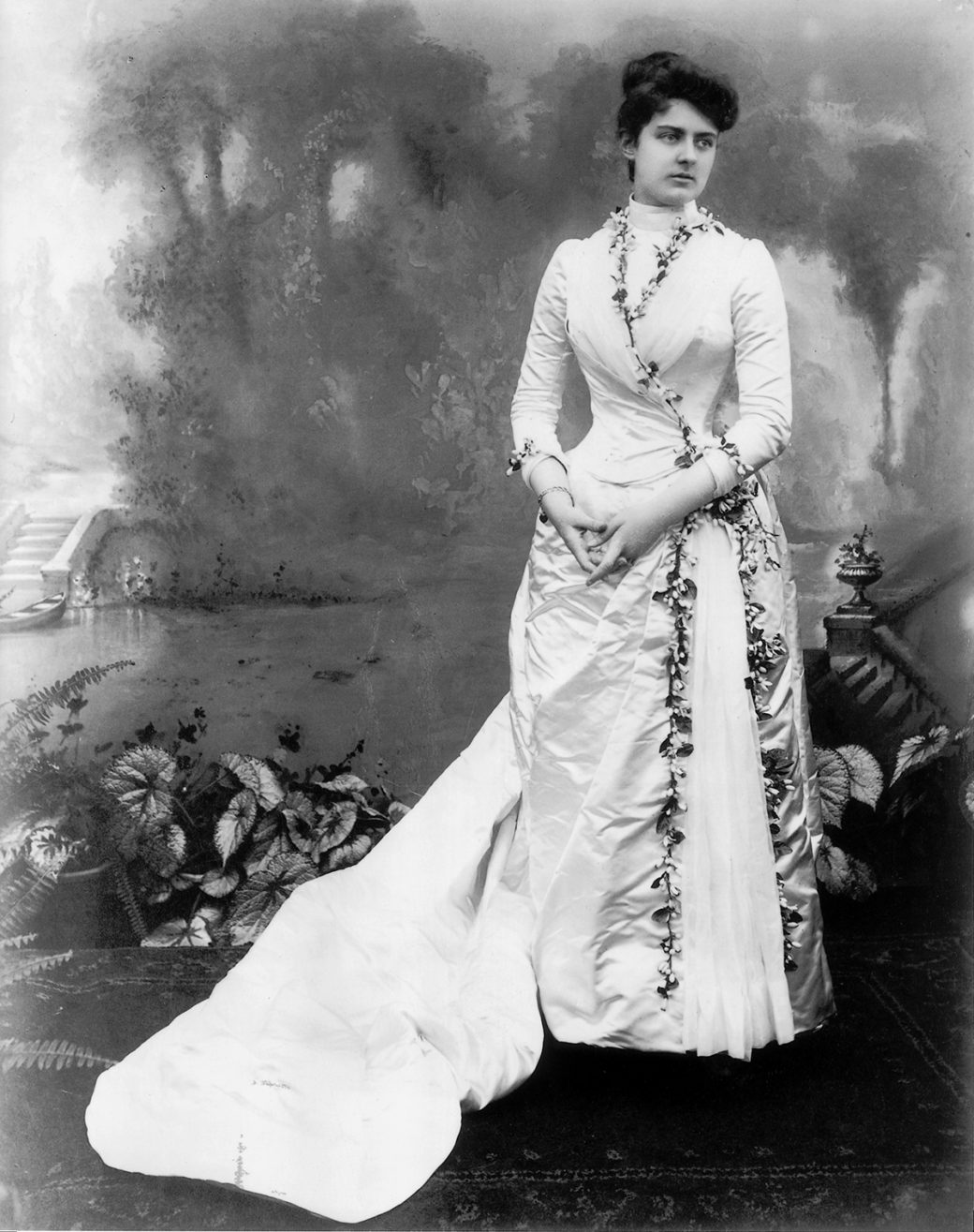
Frances Folsom in her wedding dress

Cleveland wore a black broadcloth suit and leather shoes. He had a white glove on his left hand, carrying the other. Adorning his lapel was a white rose, and he wore a white necktie. Folsom wore a short-sleeve wedding dress of ivory satin and Indian silk with orange blossoms. It had been designed by the English fashion designer Charles Frederick Worth, and she had obtained it while vacationing in Europe. The gown's train measured over 4 yards (3.7 m) long. She had no jewelry other than her engagement ring. A contemporary description of the dress was given as such:

The dress was of thick ivory satin, with high, plain corsage, elbow sleeves, and very long train. The front breadth just below the waist was draped from side to side with soft silk India muslin, attached on the left side, and nearly joining the court train. The muslin was bordered with a narrowband of orange flowers and leaves that outlined the draping. The train, which was attached to the plain bodice just below the waist, measured over four yards in length, was slightly rounded, and fell in full plaits on the floor, with no trimming but its own richness. Two scarfs of the muslin, starting from the shoulder seams, crossed the bosom in Grecian folds and were bordered with a narrow band of orange flowers to correspond with the skirt. The scarfs disappeared under a girdle of satin, crossing the bodice from left to right. The sleeves were trimmed with folds of the mull and two or three orange buds and blossoms. The tulle veil, six yards in length, was fastened with a coronet of myrtle and orange blossoms above the high coiffure, its folds lightly covering the entire train. The general effect was that of exquisite simplicity, suited to the beauty of the bride. She wore no jewelry and carried no hand-bouquet, but lightly held a superb white fan.

— Anonymous, quoted in The Bride of the White House

Following supper, the newlyweds changed into their travel clothes. Grover wore a black suit with a Prince Albert style frock coat. Frances wore a gray suit and a gray hat lined with velvet, picot ribbons, and ostrich feathers.

== In popular culture ==
The Clevelands' marriage was portrayed in the 2014 Drunk History episode "First Ladies", starring Alia Shawkat as Frances Folsom Cleveland, Bobby Moynihan as Grover Cleveland, and Paget Brewster as Emma Folsom.

== See also ==
- List of weddings at the White House
- Thomas J. Preston Jr. – Frances Folsom Cleveland's second husband

== Bibliography ==
- Williams, Francis Howard (1886). The Bride of the White House. Philadelphia: Bradley & Company.
