= Oak forest =

Forest with tree canopy dominated by oaks

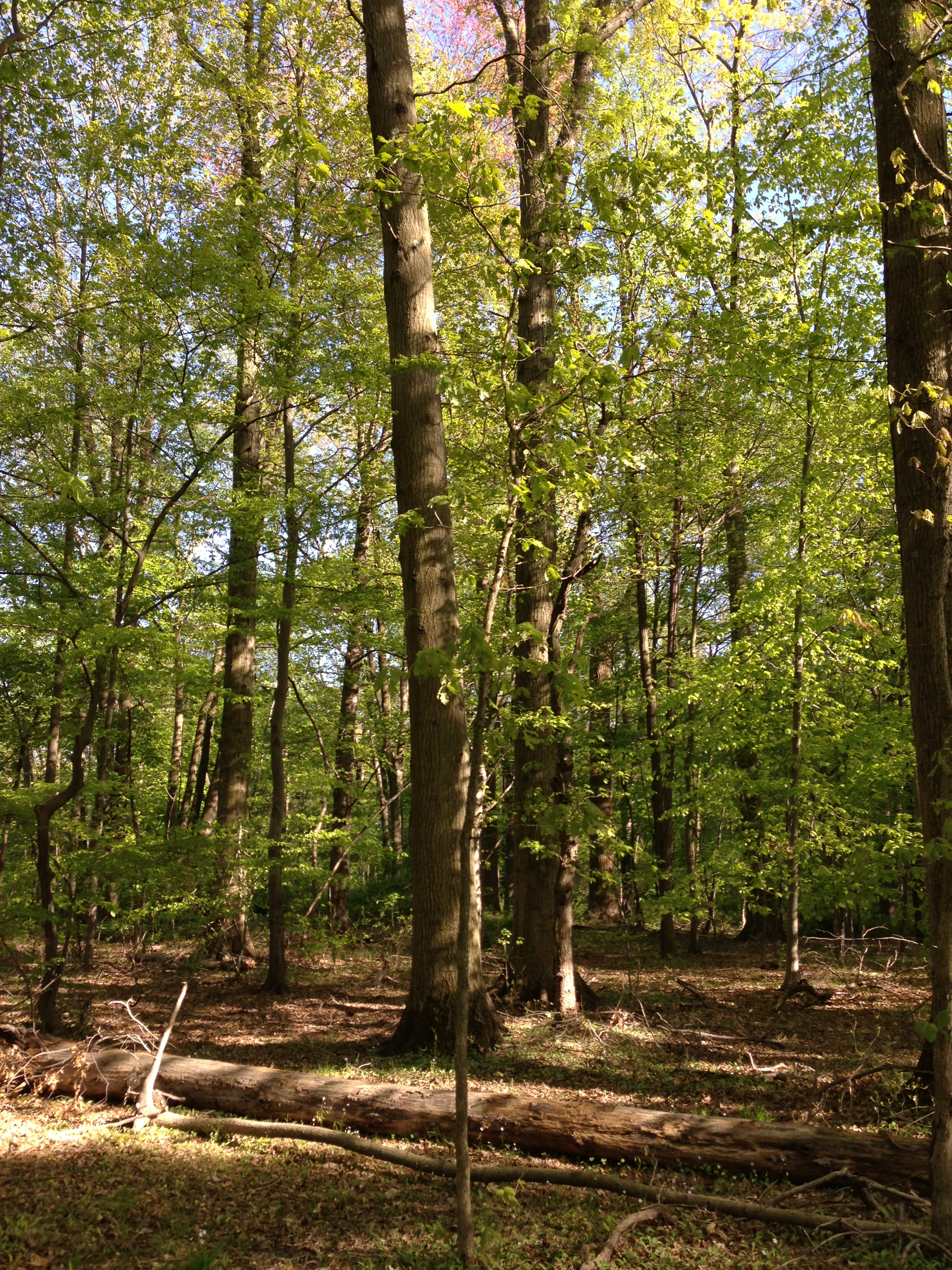
White oak (Quercus alba) in New Jersey.

An oak forest is a plant community with a tree canopy dominated by oaks (Quercus spp.). In terms of canopy closure, oak forests contain the most closed canopy, compared to oak savannas and oak woodlands.

== Geography ==
The forests are commonly found around the Appalachian Mountains and neighboring areas in the Midwest United States. Besides in North America, oak forests also occur in the temperate parts of Europe and Asia. Species richness of oak trees are highest in eastern Asia, followed by North America, and Europe, where only two (tall) oak species occur. This is believed to be due to the last Ice Age, after which many tree species disappeared from Europe (the trees faced a barrier for migration; the Mediterranean Sea). In Scandinavia, for instance, oak forest was strongly reduced during the last 400–500 years, mainly due to warfare and shipbuilding. In Sweden, the oaks only make up a few percent of the total above-ground woody biomass of forests, which are dominated by conifers and conifer forestry. However, although regeneration of oaks are problematic in Europe as well as in North America, the standing volume of oaks has increase between 1953 and 2015.

== Climate ==
=== Soil ===
Oak forests are categorized as deciduous forests which commonly have dense canopy cover (~70%) on dry soils with large amounts of undecomposed oak leaves over the ground. Soils within the forests are highly acidic and dry with habitats existing in low elevation areas as well as large mountainsides, providing resources and an ecosystem for large amounts of common plant and animal species in those regions.

=== Temperature ===
These forests can thrive under a wide variety of climatic conditions, however, the optimal ranges are as follows: annual temperature, 13 °C (55 °F); annual precipitation, 1020 mm (40 in); annual snowfall, from 38 to 51 cm. (15 to 20 in); noon relative humidity in July, 55 percent; frost-free season, 6 months; and frost penetration, 25 cm (10 in) (28).

=== Flora ===
Indicated by the large presence of oaks (Quercus spp.), the community is also dominated by inflammable shrubs and different vegetation commonly seen in oak savannas and oak woodlands. This plant life is often credited with assisting in maintaining air, soil, and water quality as well as playing a major role in biodiversity of different state regions.

== Ecology and Biodiversity ==
Oak forests are temperate forest ecosystem that are dominated by oaks (Quercus spp.) that provide habitat and resources for many. species. Oaks support a wide range of wildlife by offering forage, habitat for birds, mammals, and fungi, and nesting sites. Oak ecosystems have large numbers of associated organisms, including insects that feed on oak leaves and the acorns, which support species on a higher trophic level like birds and mammals. Acorns are also an important food source for vertebrates, influencing their energy reserves during for winter and reproduction in forest wildlife. Oak ecosystems also support diverse plants, invertebrates, vertebrates, and fungi with their species richness varying by region and habitat conditions. The different structures of oak forests, indcluding the canopy gaps and deadwood, increases habitat heterogeneity, which in turn, benefits the bryophytes and lichens. Oak forest are dynamic ecosystems that respond to natural disturbances, and their ability to persist is done by their interactions between disturbance regimes and biological communities.

== Disturbance ==
Oak forests are susceptible to a shift in the tree demography, with greater abundances of shade-tolerant and fire-sensitive species, such as red maple (Acer rubrum), sugar maple (A. saccharum), American beech (Fagus grandifolia) and hickory (Carya spp.). This leads to a lack of oak seedlings and saplings to grow and replace mature oaks (Quercus spp.) once they die and growth in abundance of new species. Deer browse is also a large threat to the plant community as white-tailed deer (Odocoileus virginianus) use oak seedlings for consumption at growing rates with increasing population sizes. Oak wilt is a major biological disturbance affecting oak trees (Quercus spp.) forests in North America, caused by the fungal pathogen (Bretziella fagacearum). The disease disrupts forest structure, composition, and function by causing rapid mortality in oak species, particularly in red oaks (Quercus rubra) (Gibbs & French 1979). Oak wilt spreads through two primary pathways including overland transmission through insect vectors and below-ground transmission through root grafts. Oak wilt causes rapid canopy loss and alters forest composition by selectively removing susceptible oak species. Red oaks often die within weeks of infection, while white oaks (Quercus section Quercus) may experience slower decline due to greater capacity for vascular compartmentalization (Rioux & Blais 2023). These differences can lead to long-term shifts in species composition and changes in habitat structure for wildlife. Management strategies focus on preventing new infections and limiting the spread of the disease.

== Human Use and Impact ==
To combat this, the New River Gorge National Park and Preserve attempted controlled fires to burn off leaf litter of competing non-oaks without harming mature trees to encourage oak seed growth. Only the site of Backus Mountain showed positive effects of the controlled burns as oak seedlings grew in amount and maple seedlings reduced while all other sites found decreases in oak seeds. Deer browse is also combatted by the organization with tall deer fences being installed in 10-acre sections of oak forests, promoting the growth of tall oak seedlings regularly and is now encourage by the National Park Service to forest managers having to handle similar issues.

== Examples ==
- Southern dry-mesic oak forests in Minnesota dominated by red oak (Quercus rubra), white oak (Q. alba), and basswood (Tilia americana)
- Foloi oak forest in Greece, dominated by Quercus frainetto
- Oak–hickory forest throughout eastern North America
- Oak–heath forest
- Tekoa Mountain in Massachusetts

== See also ==
- Oak savanna
- Oak woodland
