= The Barnstormers Theatre =

American theater group and facility

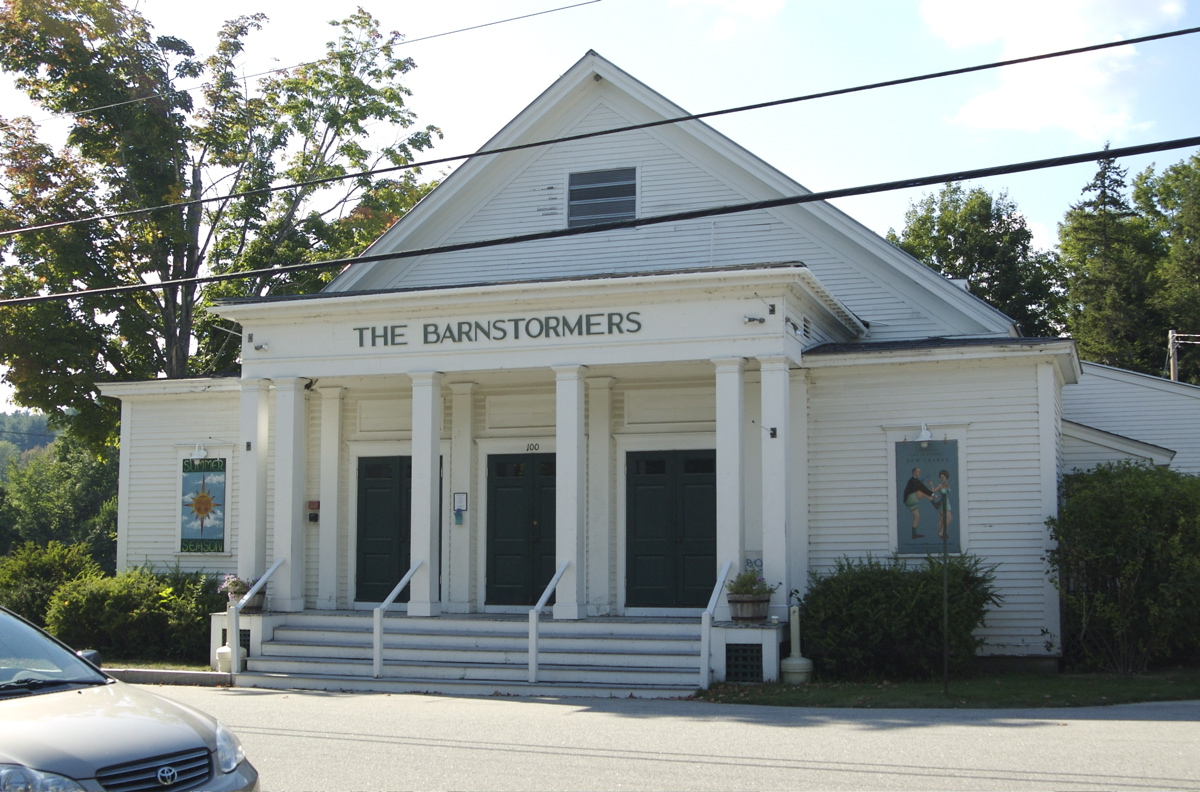
- Interactive map of The Barnstormers Theatre
- Address: 104 Main Street; Tamworth, New Hampshire; U.S.
- Coordinates: 43°51′35″N 71°15′56″W
- Capacity: 282

Construction
- Opened: Group: 1931; 95 years ago Building: 1936; 90 years ago

Website
- www.barnstormerstheatre.org

NH State Register of Historic Places
- Designated: May 12, 2025

The Barnstormers Theatre, located in Tamworth, New Hampshire, is the oldest ongoing professional summer theatre in the United States. It was co-founded in 1931 by Francis Cleveland, the son of President Grover Cleveland. It is one of the few professional theatres in the United States that performs eight shows in eight consecutive weeks every summer.

== History ==
In 1931, Francis and Alice Cleveland founded the theatre company, along with their friend Ed Goodnow. During the summer, they would lead a company of resident actors around the region, performing different plays each night. In some cases, they would literally storm barns, arriving in the afternoon to set up their scenery and lights in time for an evening performance.

In 1935, the acting company purchased Kimball's Store on Main Street, across from the Tamworth Inn, and transformed the building into a theatre for the 1936 season. Since then, the theatre's acting company has kept the rigorous schedule of rehearsing one play by day, and performing another by night, from the end of June to the beginning of September. Francis Cleveland acted as artistic director until his death in 1995.

In 1998, The Barnstormers Theatre was renovated and improved. It now seats 282 patrons, is heated and air conditioned, and hosts touring productions as well as producing summer theatre. Many of The Barnstormers' performances are classic comedies, murder mysteries, and musicals from the British and American stage. In 2006, The Barnstormers celebrated their 75th anniversary.

In May 2025, the building was added to the New Hampshire State Register of Historic Places.

== See also ==
- New Hampshire Historical Marker No. 90: First Summer Playhouse
