= Oak woodland =

Plant community dominated by oaks

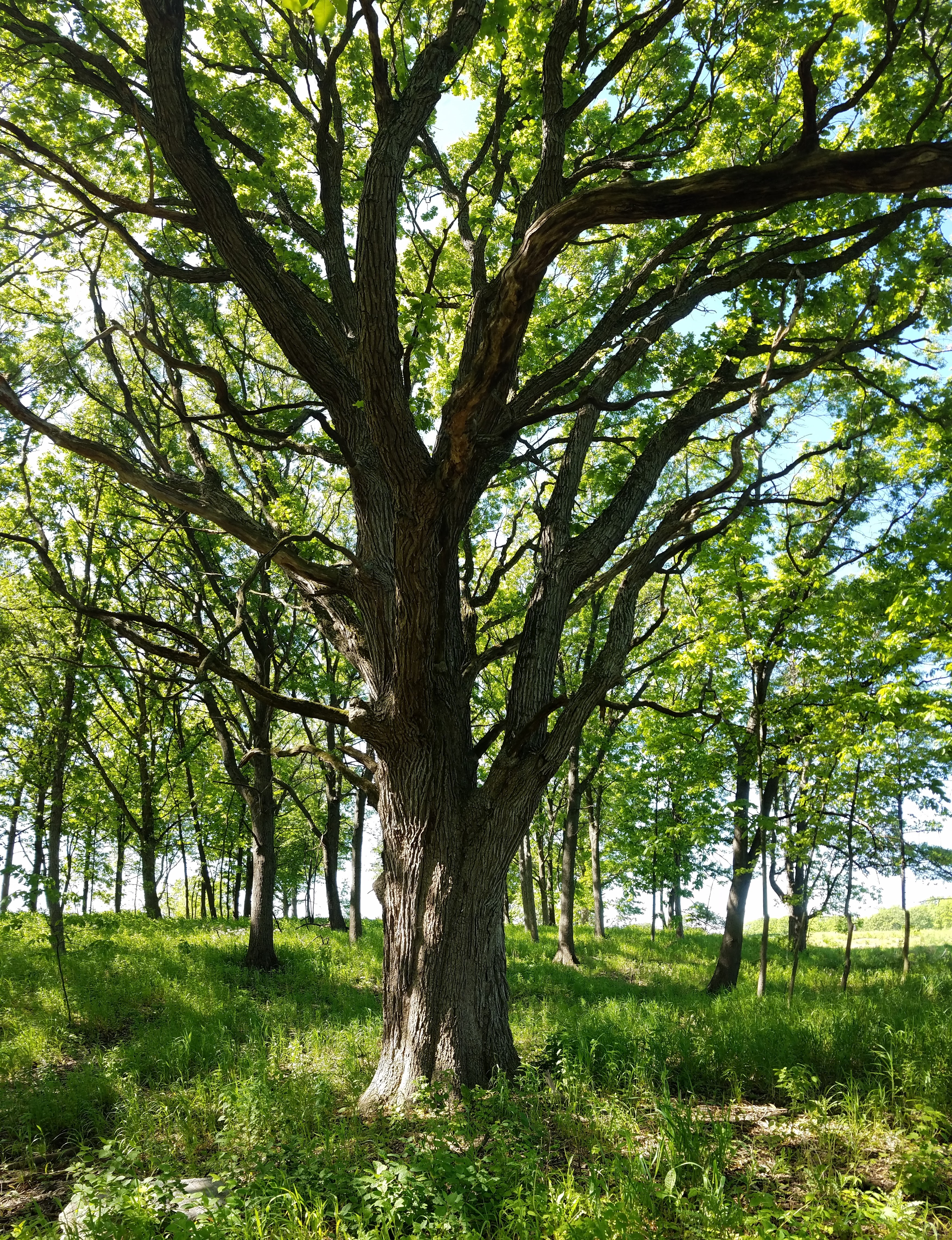
Oak woodland in Lake County, Illinois

An oak woodland is a plant community with a tree canopy dominated by oaks (Quercus spp.). In terms of canopy closure, oak woodlands are intermediate between oak savanna, which is more open, and oak forest, which is more closed. Although the community is named for the dominance of oak trees, the understory vegetation is often diverse and includes many species of grasses, sedges, forbs, ferns, shrubs, and other plants.

== Examples ==
- Upper Midwestern United States oak woodlands dominated by white oak (Quercus alba), burr oak (Q. macrocarpa), and black oak (Q. velutina), with subdominant canopy species red oak (Q. rubra) and shagbark hickory (Carya ovata), with a diverse understory. The community is fire-dependent, shaped by annual, low-intensity fires.
- Cork oak (Quercus suber) woodlands in the Mediterranean region.
- Blue oak woodland is found in the inner coast ranges and the Sierra Nevada foothills in California, surrounding the Central Valley. They form what some refer to as a bathtub ring. Primary species are blue oak (Q. douglasii) and interior live oak (Q. wizlizeni), with gray pine (Pinus sabiniana), California buckeye (Aesculus californica), and western redbud (Cercis occidentalis). Blue oak woodlands cover about 2,939,000 acres (11,890 km^{2}) of the state of California, and of this area about 79%, or 2,322,000 acres (9,400 km^{2}), shows no evidence of past cutting of trees.
- In California's mediterranean climate oak woodlands exist between 60 and 700 meters in elevation. There are three main geographic regions for oak woodlands in California. North of the Central Valley, Central Valley Foothills and Coastal Range, and South of the Central Valley. California Valley oak woodland holds valley oak (Quercus lobata), California sycamore (Platanus racemosa), black walnut (Juglans nigra), California boxelder, and Fremont cottonwood (Populus fremontii). This woodland can be found between 500 and 1700 meters above sea level. The soils are deep and made from alluvium.
