= Frances Cleveland =

First Lady of the United States (1886–1889; 1893–1897)

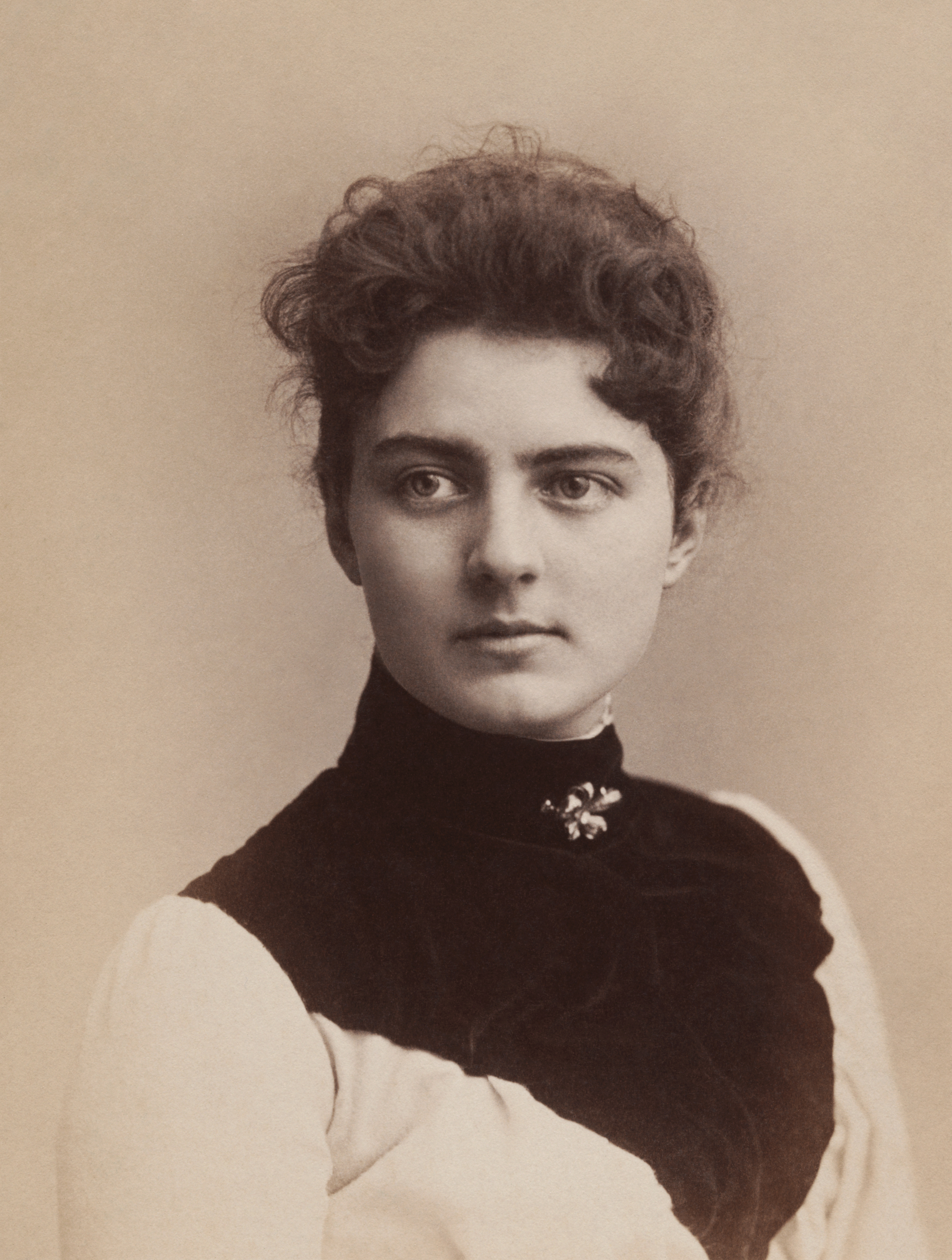
- Cleveland, c. 1886

First Lady of the United States
- In role March 4, 1893 – March 4, 1897
- President: Grover Cleveland
- Preceded by: Mary Harrison McKee (acting)
- Succeeded by: Ida Saxton McKinley
- In role June 2, 1886 – March 4, 1889
- President: Grover Cleveland
- Preceded by: Rose Cleveland (acting)
- Succeeded by: Caroline Harrison

Personal details
- Born: Frances Clara Folsom; July 21, 1864 Buffalo, New York, U.S.
- Died: October 29, 1947 (aged 83) Baltimore, Maryland, U.S.
- Resting place: Princeton Cemetery
- Party: Democratic
- Spouses: Grover Cleveland (m. 1886; died 1908); Thomas J. Preston Jr. (m. 1913)
- Children: 5, including Ruth, Esther, Richard, and Francis
- Education: Wells College (BA)

Frances Clara Cleveland Preston (née Folsom, christened Frank Clara; July 21, 1864 – October 29, 1947) was the first lady of the United States from 1886 to 1889 and again from 1893 until 1897, as the wife of President Grover Cleveland. She was the first to hold the position nonconsecutively. Having married Cleveland at age 21, she was the youngest first lady in American history.

When Folsom was an infant, she first met Grover Cleveland. Her father, Oscar Folsom, was a close friend to Cleveland. When her father died in 1875, Cleveland became the executor of the estate, paid off the family's outstanding debts, and provided for the well-being of Frances and her mother, Emma. After graduating from Wells College, she married Grover Cleveland during his first presidential term. When he lost reelection in 1888, the Clevelands went into private life for four years and began having children. After Grover Cleveland was elected president again in 1892, Frances dedicated much of her time in the second term to her children.

The Clevelands had five children, four of whom survived to adulthood. Cleveland became involved in education advocacy, serving on the Wells College board, supporting women's education, and organizing the construction of kindergartens. Grover Cleveland died in 1908, and in 1913, Frances married Thomas J. Preston Jr.. She continued to work in education activism after leaving the White House, becoming involved with Princeton University. During World War I, she advocated military preparedness. She died in 1947 and was buried alongside her first husband in Princeton Cemetery.

== Early life ==
=== Childhood ===
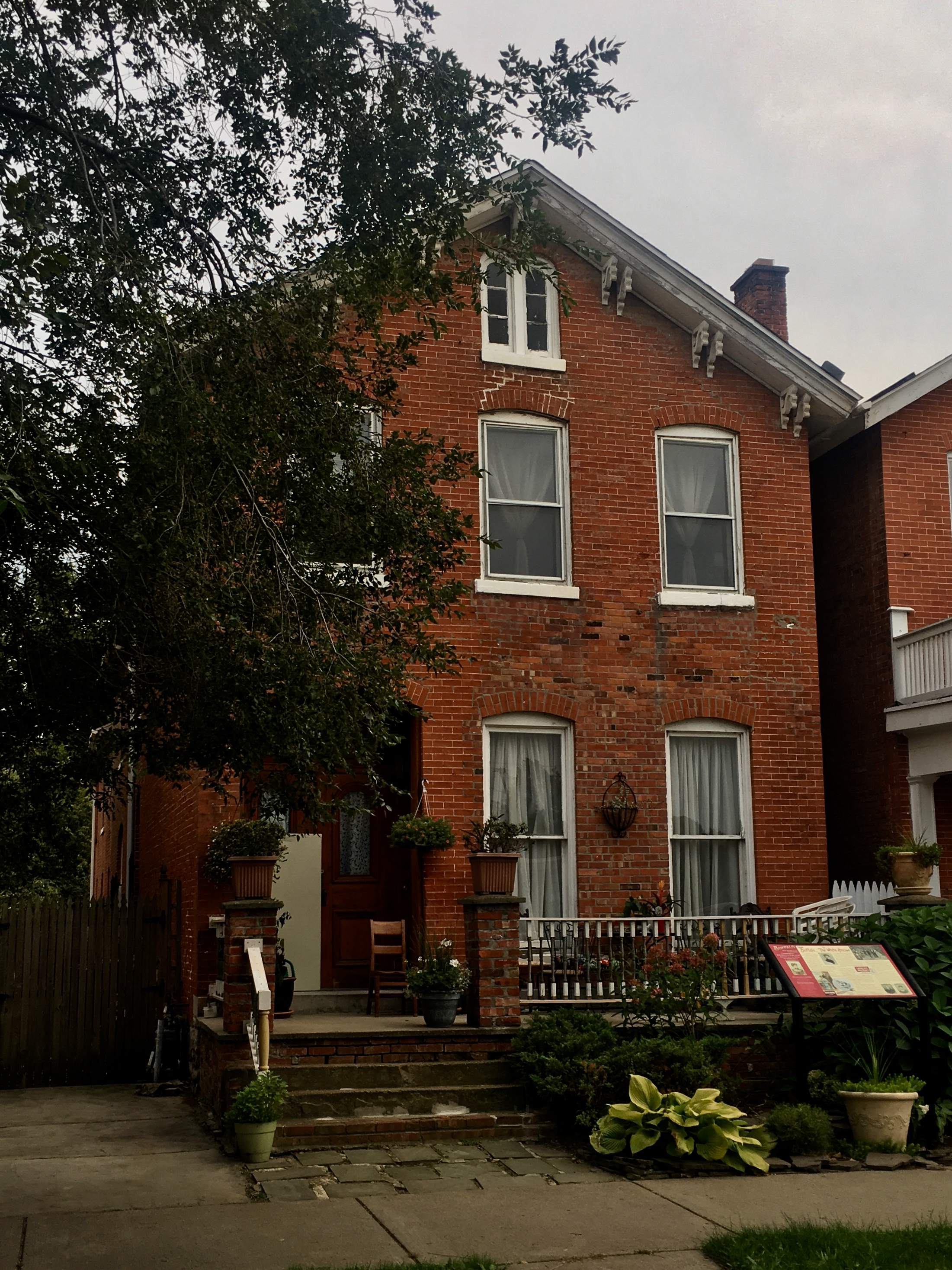
Frances Folsom's childhood home in Buffalo, New York

Born in Buffalo, New York, on July 21, 1864, Frances Clara Folsom was the first child of Emma (née Harmon) and Oscar Folsom. Her only sibling, Nellie Augusta, died in infancy in 1872. Her father was a lawyer who had a law partnership with Grover Cleveland. She and Cleveland first met when Folsom was still an infant; he was a regular presence in her childhood, and he bought her her first baby carriage. Although the Folsoms were financially secure when she was born, her father's gambling habits and his penchant for helping others with his money caused them financial trouble as she grew.

Folsom attended school at Madame Brecker's French Kindergarten and Miss Bissell's School for Young Ladies, both of which were among Buffalo's best-regarded schools and guaranteed her an education above that of most women in her time. When not in school, she regularly spent time with Cleveland, known to her as "Uncle Cleve". As a child, she went by the name Frank, and she was christened under this name as a teenager. The name sometimes caused her problems when she was assigned to boys' activities in school.

Folsom's father died in a carriage accident on July 23, 1875. Cleveland was given charge of his estate and became Folsom's unofficial guardian. Folsom and her mother moved to live with relatives, first with Folsom's aunt in Saint Paul, Minnesota, and then with her grandmother in Medina, New York. They eventually returned to Buffalo and lived in different boarding houses until they found a home.

=== Wells College ===
When Folsom was 14, she joined the Presbyterian Church, to which she remained devoted throughout her life. She attended Central High School in Buffalo, where she was briefly engaged to a seminary student, but the engagement was broken when they decided to remain friends. Folsom left Central High School in October 1881, before her schooling was finished.

Although Folsom had not finished school, Cleveland used his authority as the mayor of Buffalo to obtain for her a certificate of completion and entry into Wells College in Aurora, New York as a sophomore. Here she learned etiquette and manners from Helen Fairchild Smith, and she quickly became a prominent student at the school, taking her place at the center of its social life. At Wells, she became interested in photography and political science, and she participated in the Phoenix Society, a campus debate club. Folsom received two more marriage proposals at Wells, both on the same day. She accepted one of them, but this engagement was also ended by a decision to remain friends.

Cleveland, who became governor of New York at this time, maintained correspondence with Folsom while she attended Wells. He visited her, sent her flowers, and brought her on tours of New York when her schedule permitted. Folsom was unable to attend Cleveland's presidential inauguration as it conflicted with her final exams, but she visited him at the White House during spring break some weeks later. Washington, D.C., left a positive impression on her, and she accompanied the new president on his nightly walks in the East Room while she stayed at the White House. Folsom was also permitted to ascend the Washington Monument before its opening, where she met former first lady Harriet Lane.

=== Engagement ===
Folsom graduated from Wells on June 20, 1885, and she spent the summer at her grandfather's home in Wyoming County, New York. Cleveland proposed marriage by letter in August 1885, while Folsom was visiting a friend in Scranton, Pennsylvania. After accepting, Folsom accompanied her mother and her cousin on a year-long tour of Europe. Despite Folsom's eagerness to wed, her mother and her future groom both insisted that she take the opportunity to travel and contemplate her future before marriage. Everyone involved agreed to keep the planned wedding a secret, and the president's sister Rose Cleveland served as White House hostess in the meantime. Rumors of their engagement were initially dismissed as gossip, as speculation of the president's love life was common. Popular gossip considered Frances' mother to be a more likely partner. Rumors grew after reporters caught up with the Folsoms and found them shopping for a wedding gown.

By the time of the Folsoms' return voyage, reporters were tracking their whereabouts, and they were forced to board their ship home in secret. They were greeted by the press upon returning to the United States, and rumors of Cleveland's interest were seemingly confirmed when representatives of the president took the Folsoms away. It was only the next night that the White House officially announced that the president intended to marry Frances Folsom. Cleveland visited Folsom in New York while he was in the city attending a Decoration Day parade on May 30, 1886, and the Folsom women took a train to Washington, D.C., on June 1. Media attention quickly turned Folsom into a celebrity.

== First Lady of the United States ==
=== Wedding ===
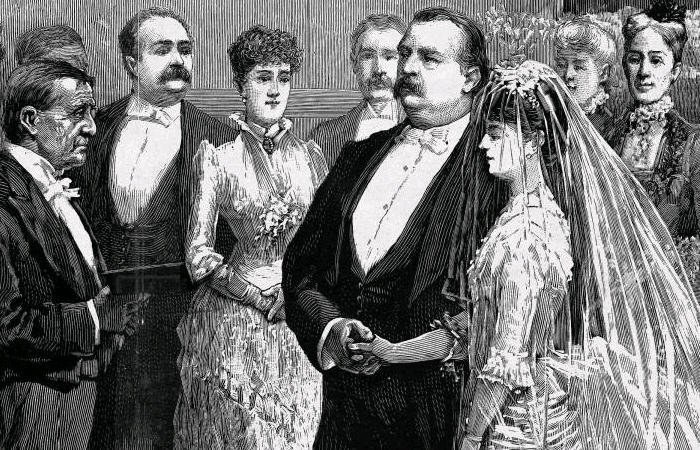
"The President's Wedding" by Thure de Thulstrup

The wedding of Grover Cleveland and Frances Folsom took place in the Blue Room of the White House on June 2, 1886. The president wished for a quiet wedding, so only 31 guests were invited, and the press was explicitly denied entry. Hundreds of well-wishers gathered outside of the White House to celebrate. Frances Cleveland was the first presidential spouse to marry in the White House, and she was the youngest presidential spouse in American history. She was 21 years old, and her groom was 49. After their wedding, the Clevelands went on honeymoon for a week in Deer Park, Maryland, where they were closely followed by reporters who intruded on their privacy. After returning to the White House, they held two wedding receptions, one of which was open to the public.

=== First term ===
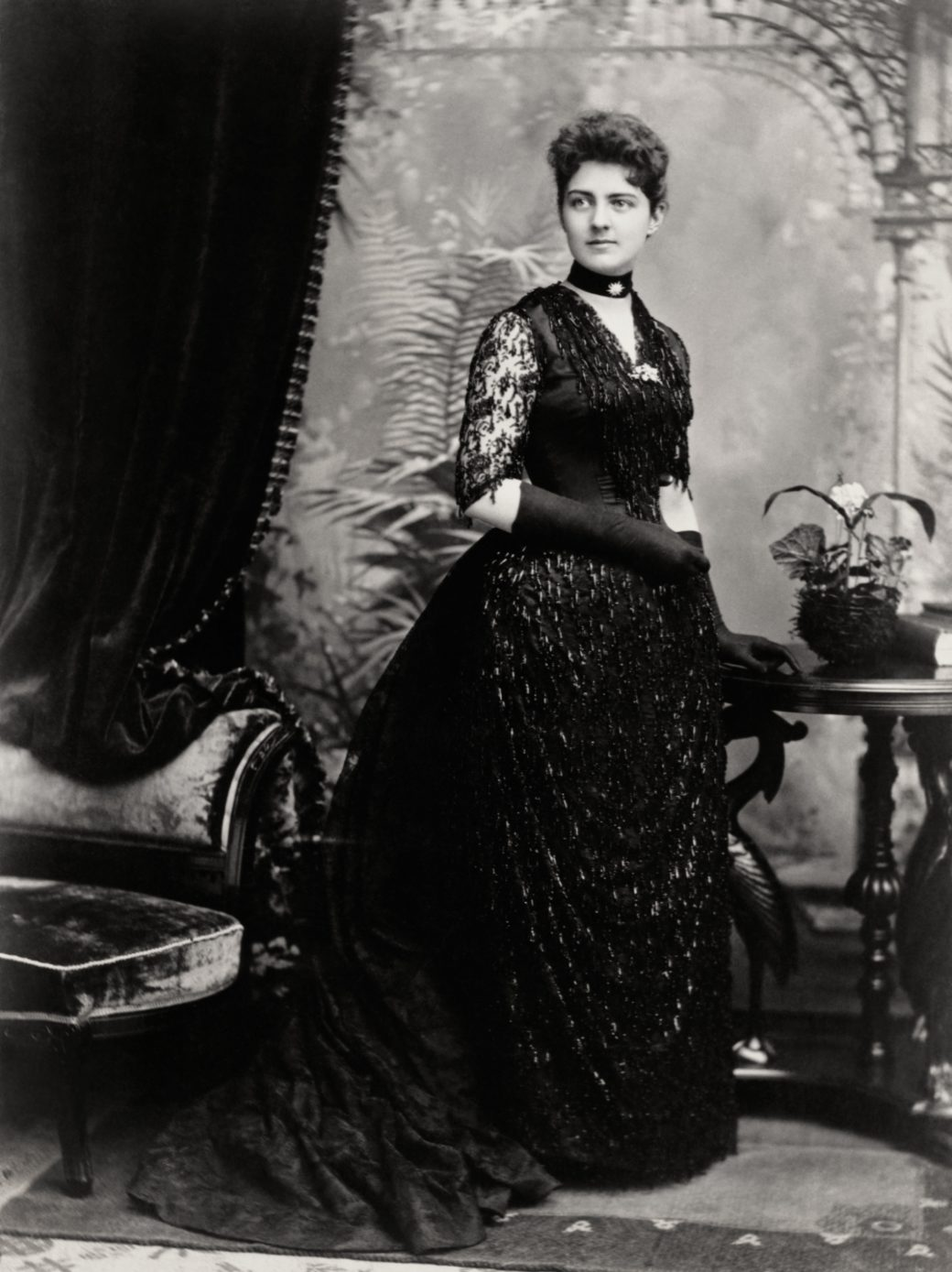
Cleveland in a formal gown (1886)

Frances Cleveland was immediately popular as first lady, attracting unprecedented publicity. She and Grover drew enough attention that the Clevelands chose not to use the living quarters of the White House. Instead, they moved to their private residence, the "Red Top", to escape from the public and the media. Each evening, the couple drove to their private home to oversee improvements. Cleveland worked with socialite Flora Payne to better prepare for a role in high society. She also became close friends with poet Richard Watson Gilder and his wife Helena, and accompanied them in meeting prominent writers of the time. Cleveland stayed involved with Wells College as well, taking a seat on its board of trustees in 1887.

Cleveland maintained an openness with the public that was not shared by her husband or by her predecessor Rose Cleveland. To accommodate all who wished to visit the White House, she hosted many social events on Saturdays to ensure that they did not conflict with the schedules of working women. Cleveland received countless letters from the American people, many of them asking her to influence the president's granting of patronage jobs. She read all of the mail that she received, but she sought assistance from the president's secretaries in replying, eventually hiring her friend Minnie Alexander as a personal secretary. Her openness extended to the White House staff as well, with whom she maintained close relationships.

Cleveland was credited with an increase in the president's sociability after their marriage. The president set aside time in his busy schedule to be with his wife, attending the theater and going on carriage rides. While Cleveland had considerable influence in their home life, she had little involvement in the political aspects of her husband's administration. Her popularity nonetheless served her husband's administration well. Many of the president's political opponents acknowledged the difficulty of attacking the administration when the first lady had such support, and critics were careful not to attack her directly lest they provoke backlash. She was once even sent as the president's representative during the Great Tariff Debate of 1888 to quietly observe from the visitors' gallery.

In 1887, the Clevelands toured the United States. Frances endured a severe insect bite and a black eye, and she spent so much time shaking hands that she needed to use an ice pack each night. Crowds of people became a constant on their trip, often preventing their carriage from moving. Their visit to Chicago was attended by about 100,000 people, with the crowd becoming so large that Cleveland had to be taken away by aides for her own safety while police and soldiers attempted to control the crowd. Cleveland avoided such publicized appearances for the rest of her time as first lady.

Toward the end of the president's first term, opponents began crafting rumors to diminish her reputation. One rumor suggested that Grover was abusive toward Frances. In response, Frances praised her husband and harshly condemned the rumor as a political smear. For the first lady to speak so openly about such a topic was unprecedented. Another rumor suggested that she was unfaithful to her husband, having an affair with newspaper editor Henry Watterson. She remained a prominent figure when her husband sought reelection in the 1888 presidential election. The 1888 Democratic National Convention was the first such convention in which a first lady was recognized during a speech.

=== Between first lady tenures ===
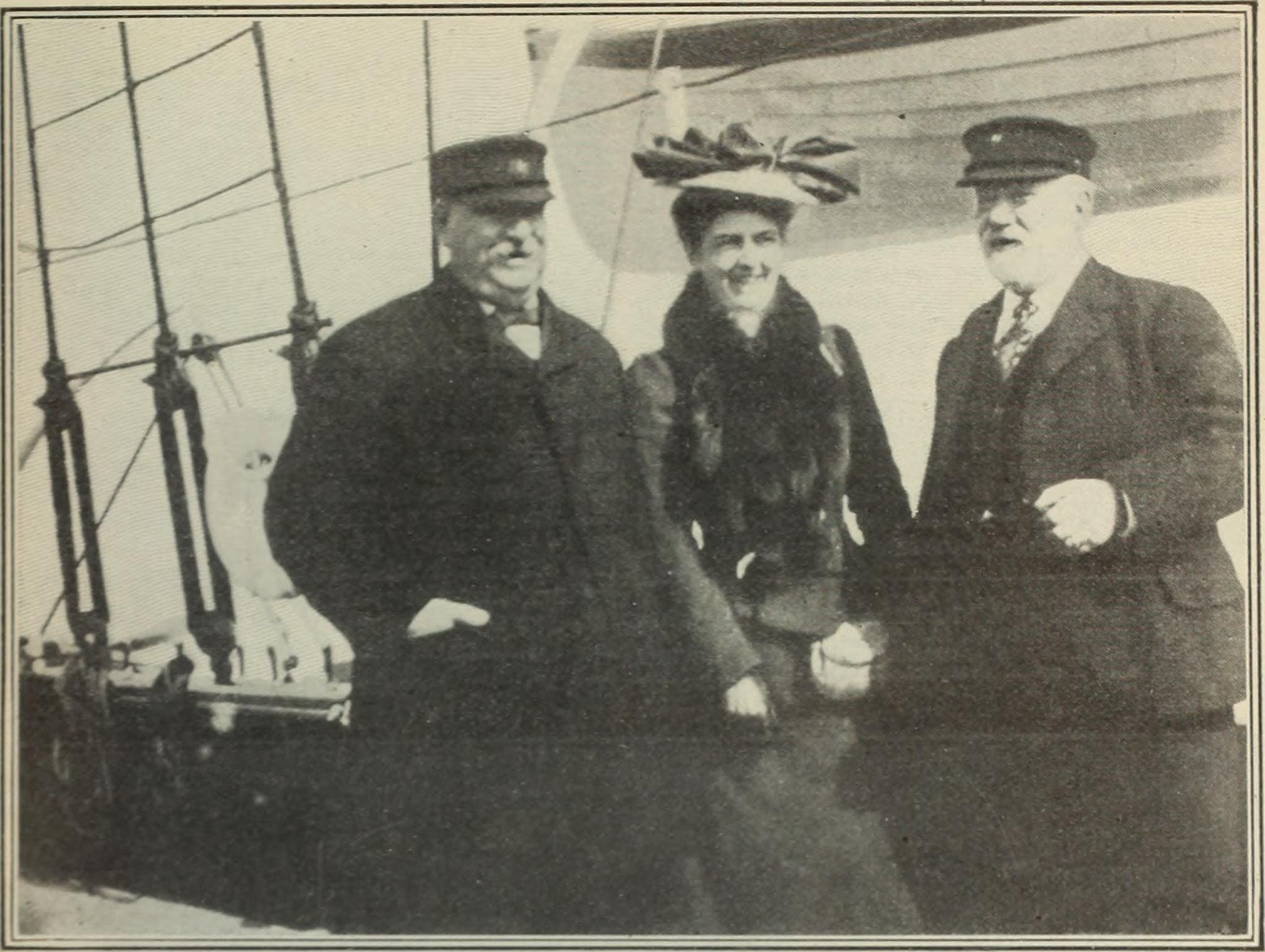
Cleveland with her husband and Elias Cornelius Benedict on the Oneida steam-yacht in 1890

Cleveland's tenure as first lady ended after her husband lost his reelection campaign, but she correctly predicted a non-consecutive term. As she left the White House, Frances Cleveland told a staff member, "Now, Jerry, I want you to take good care of all the furniture and ornaments in the house, for I want to find everything just as it is now, when we come back again." When asked when she would return, she responded, "We are coming back four years from today."

The Clevelands left the White House, sold the Red Top house, and moved to Madison Avenue in New York. Cleveland struggled with the transition from public to private life, having never run a private household of her own. She underwent a period of depression over the following months, and she retreated to the Gilders' cottage in Marion, Massachusetts. The Clevelands found a cottage to rent in the area, and they eventually purchased the Gray Gables summer home in Buzzards Bay, Massachusetts, where the couple developed their own private home life. Here they often hosted close friends, including the Gilders and actor Joseph Jefferson. Cleveland found comfort in this house, where she and her husband could lead a relatively normal life.

Despite no longer being the first lady, Cleveland remained in the public spotlight. In between her tenures as first lady, Cleveland took on charity work and grew more involved in New York social life through her charitable projects. Although they occasionally worked together on these projects, Frances and Grover for the most part led separate social lives after leaving the White House. Among her charitable endeavors was the promotion of kindergartens in New York, serving as the vice president of Gilder's New York Kindergarten Association. Frances received further attention when she became a mother with the birth of Ruth Cleveland in 1891. She dedicated herself to Ruth, taking on many of the roles that a woman of her status would have typically given to a nurse, such as bathing the child.

Grover ran for president again in the 1892 presidential election. Although he never approved of it, Frances' image was often used prominently in campaign material. Her social connections and press coverage were valuable for the Cleveland campaign in New York. Her charity work in the state and her friendship with the Gilders enabled the Clevelands to build connections with New York's Four Hundred society and helped win over disaffected Republicans. These factors contributed to Grover winning in his home state, which he had failed to do in 1888. Nonetheless, he disapproved of any involvement his wife had in the political aspects of his career. After Grover was reelected president, the Clevelands left their home on Madison Avenue, spending the period before the inauguration living on 51st Street next door to their friend Elias Cornelius Benedict and then in Lakewood, New Jersey.

=== Second term ===
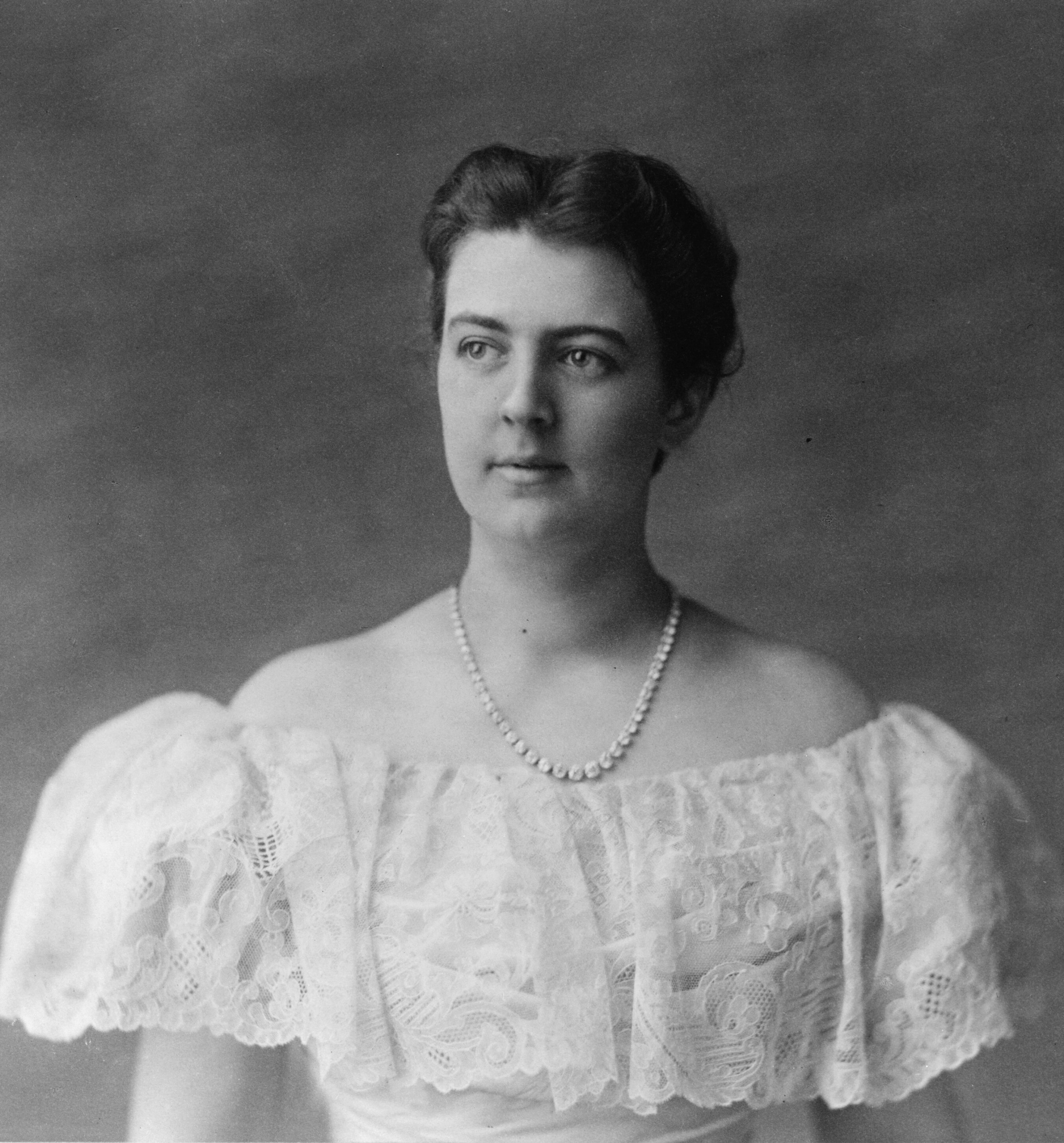
Cleveland in February 1897

The Clevelands returned to the White House on March 4, 1893. Just as her husband was the first president to serve nonconsecutively, Frances became the first to serve as first lady nonconsecutively. She was more apprehensive about taking the role for a second time, now being aware of all that it entailed. Her routine largely resembled that of her first tenure, including her evening drives with the president and her Saturday receptions. She received the familiar crowds that she had encountered during her previous time as first lady as well as heads of state, including one instance in which she disregarded precedent by meeting with Infanta Eulalia of Spain at her hotel. She also continued her work in the establishment of kindergartens and became involved with the Home for Friendless Colored Girls, visiting the Metropolitan African Methodist Episcopal Church with the group in 1896.

Cleveland became increasingly protective of her husband during his second term—a reversal of their relationship in his first term. The president's work grew more difficult as the Panic of 1893 set in, and Cleveland found herself tending to her husband. The president's health was in decline during his second term, and his wife became increasingly responsible for his well-being, encouraging him to exert himself less. When it became apparent that the president had cancer, she took responsibility for keeping his condition a secret and tending to his health, despite her pregnancy with her second child, which at this time was in its seventh month. She provided excuses for his absences and wrote letters on his behalf, insisting that he was merely suffering from rheumatism.

Cleveland had two more daughters as first lady: Esther Cleveland in 1893 and Marion Cleveland in 1895. She gave birth to Esther in the White House, making her the only first lady to give birth in the presidential residence. Much of her time was dedicated to raising her three children, and she would even play on the floor with her children, to the shock of the servants who had never before seen a first lady act in such a manner. Cleveland also took an interest in German culture during her husband's second term, learning to speak the language and hiring a German nurse so her children would learn it as well. Cleveland's time was split between her responsibilities as first lady and those as a mother. Her second term was not as socially active as her first, and she hosted only one reception in the 1894 social season.

The Clevelands were upset at the extent of press and public attention focused on their children, and they controversially had the White House closed to the public while they were present. They purchased another private residence, Woodley, where they could live away from the White House. Harassment from the public continued at their new residence, and Cleveland was particularly frightened by an incident in 1894 when three men were stalking their home. Fearing for her children's safety, she had the local police station post a guard at their home, choosing not to worry her husband with the news.

Three thousand people attended the first lady's final Saturday reception to shake her hand. Cleveland wept as she left the White House, personally saying goodbye to each member of the staff. This organized farewell would be replicated by future first ladies, becoming a tradition. Despite her emotional departure, she later expressed relief that she was no longer first lady, remembering the rumors and falsehoods that had surrounded her.

== Widowhood and remarriage ==
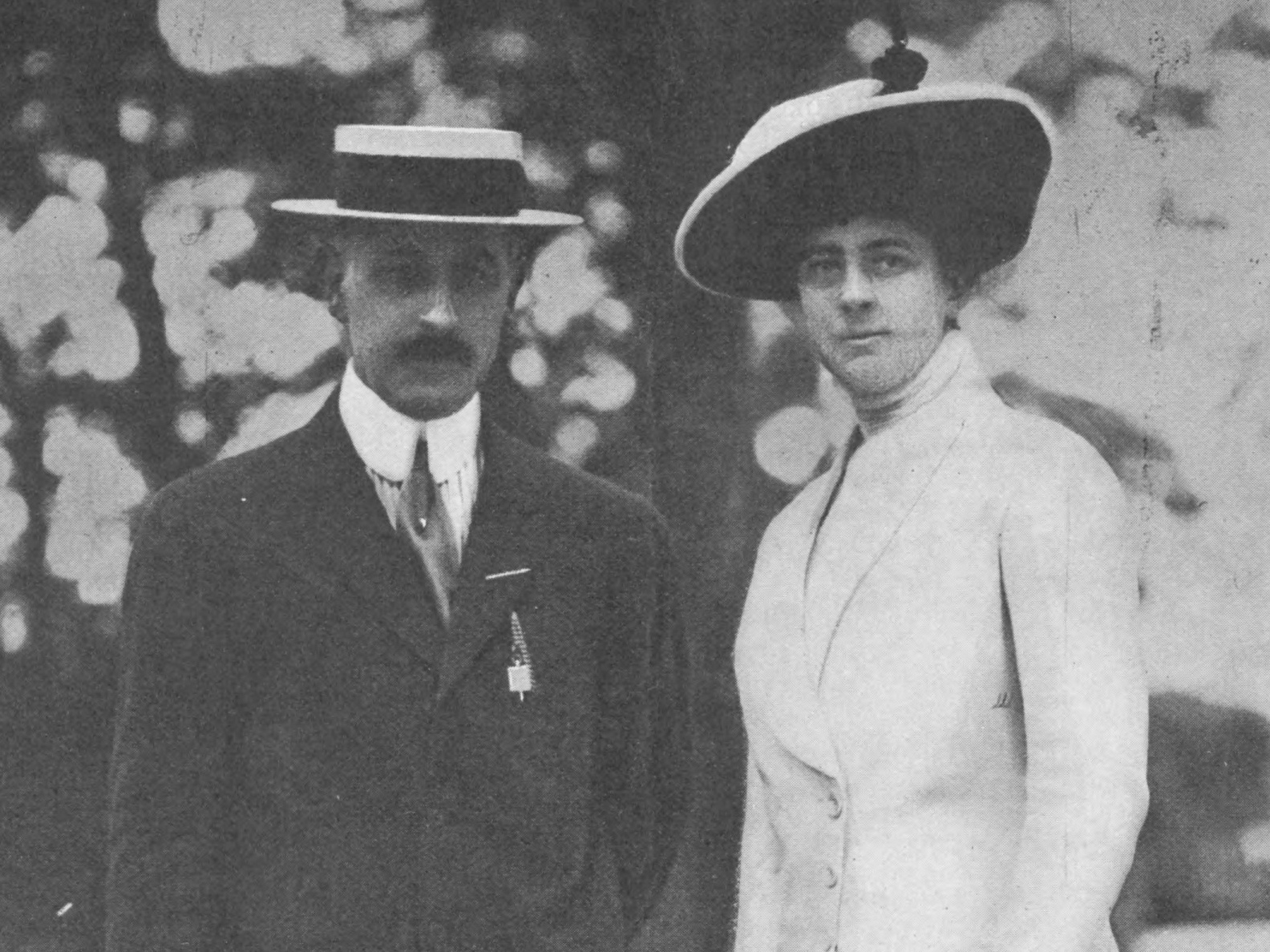
Frances with her second husband Thomas J. Preston Jr. in 1913

After leaving the White House for the second time, the Clevelands bought Westland, a house in Princeton, New Jersey. They had two more children over the following years: Richard F. Cleveland and Francis Cleveland. Their firstborn daughter, Ruth, died of diphtheria in 1904 at their Gray Gables vacation home. Wishing to avoid memories of Ruth's illness and death, the Clevelands sold the home and purchased Intermont, a summer home in Tamworth, New Hampshire. They involved themselves with Princeton University and provided financial support for many Princeton students. Grover died in 1908, and Frances was left to raise their four remaining children alone. She refused the pension to which she was legally entitled as a widowed first lady, but she did accept the franking privilege that was offered to presidential widows in 1909.

In March 1909, Cleveland held a memorial service for her husband at Carnegie Hall. After her husband's death, Cleveland became involved in a legal battle against writer Broughton Brandenburg, who had been paid by The New York Times for an article supposedly written by Grover Cleveland before his death, but which was found to be a forgery created by Brandenburg. She was unable to prevent its publication after she discovered that it was fraudulent. She testified against Brandenburg in court, and he was found guilty of grand larceny. The ordeal made national headlines. Still grieving for her husband, Cleveland spent time away on a vacation to Europe with her family from September 1909 to May 1910.

On October 29, 1912, Wells College announced that Cleveland intended to remarry. She was engaged to Thomas J. Preston Jr., professor of archaeology and acting president at Wells College, where she served as a trustee. She was invited to return to the White House for a dinner to celebrate her engagement in January 1913, much to the excitement of the staff who had known her previously. As with her previous engagement, she was secretive about the process to limit media attention. Both Wells College and Princeton University congratulated them with the expectation that the couple would be active at their respective campuses. Frances Cleveland and Thomas Preston were wed on February 10, 1913. She was the first presidential widow to remarry. After their marriage, the Prestons went on honeymoon in Florida. Her second husband went on to teach at Princeton University, where she continued to be a prominent figure in campus social life.

== Later life ==
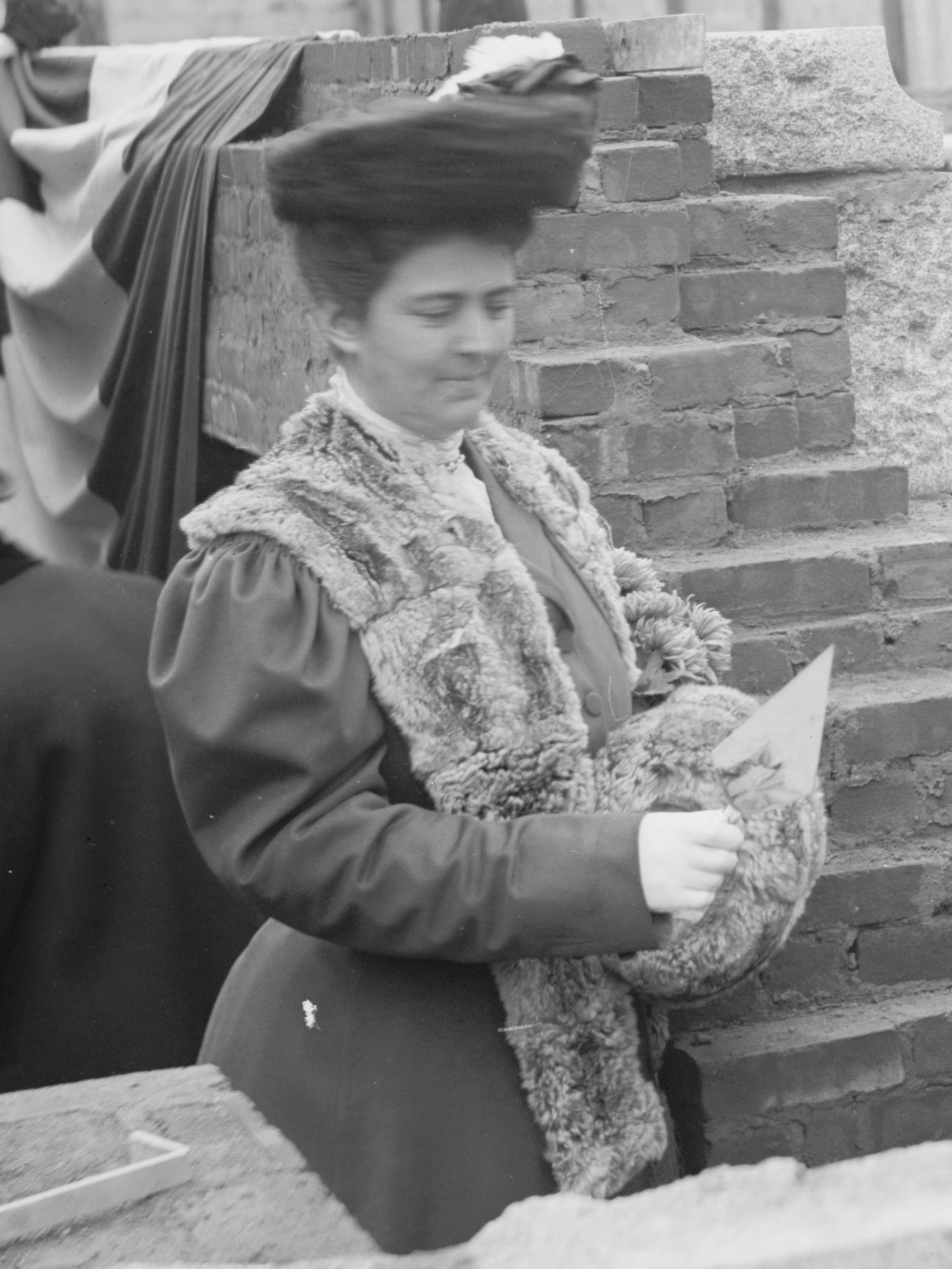
Cleveland with a trowel at a building foundation ceremony

The Prestons moved to London in April 1914. Frances Cleveland-Preston was vacationing with her children and her mother in St. Moritz, Switzerland, when World War I began in August 1914. They returned to the United States via Genoa, arriving on October 1. Cleveland-Preston and her husband worked with activists Solomon Stanwood Menken and Robert McNutt McElroy throughout the war to promote military preparedness. She was appointed head of the speakers' bureau of the National Security League (NSL), where she was responsible for organizing rallies and other events to support the war effort. She caused controversy by accusing some Americans of being unassimilated, and she resigned from her position on December 8, 1919, after backlash to what some in the NSL saw as overzealous views around patriotic education.

Cleveland-Preston became more outspoken in her political beliefs as she grew older, taking a prominent position as an opponent of women's suffrage and serving as the vice president of the New Jersey Association Opposed to Woman's Suffrage from 1913 to 1920. In the 1928 presidential election, she gave her only formal political endorsement to someone other than her first husband, endorsing Al Smith for president. She had met the Smiths and grew upset with the anti-Catholic attacks against them. She was especially sympathetic to his wife Catherine, and Cleveland-Preston made a point of sitting with her at events as a show of support.

Cleveland-Preston supported Franklin D. Roosevelt as president in 1932, and she admired his wife Eleanor Roosevelt, but she declined to vote for Roosevelt in 1940 due to her first husband's opposition to a third term. She subsequently supported Harry S. Truman. During the Truman presidency, she was invited to a luncheon at the White House where she met General Dwight D. Eisenhower. Eisenhower is quoted as not recognizing her and asking where in the city she used to live, prompting her to respond that she had lived in the White House.

Later in life, Cleveland-Preston was afflicted by cataracts, and she learned Braille to use a Braille typewriter and her health decline started on her early 80s. She continued to use it after her cataracts were removed, translating books into Braille for blind children. She was involved with the theater community in her old age, sometimes traveling with the theater troupe founded by her son. Cleveland-Preston attended the Princeton University bicentennial celebration in June 1946, which proved to be her final public appearance. While staying at her son Richard's home for his 50th birthday in Baltimore, she died in her sleep at the age of 83 on October 29, 1947. She holds the record as the first lady with the longest post-presidency. She was buried in Princeton Cemetery next to President Cleveland.

== Legacy ==
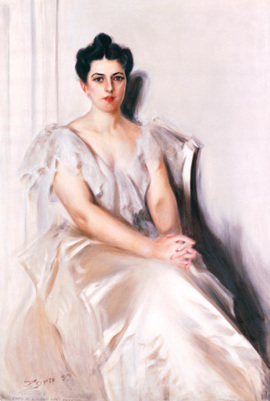
Frances Cleveland by Anders Zorn, 1899

Cleveland was much-loved as first lady, drawing an unprecedented level of media and public attention. Her travels and activities were meticulously documented by reporters, to the president's ire. The furor at times even became dangerous, with large crowds pushing to see her, threatening to topple into her and one another. Her presence in the White House mitigated her husband's surly reputation and fostered an image of the president as a loving husband, and later as a loving father.

Cleveland's reputation influenced the role of first lady for generations after her tenure. The form letters used by Cleveland as first lady remained in use, eventually being redrafted by Eleanor Roosevelt. In honor of Frances Cleveland, Cleveland Hall was constructed in 1911 on the Wells College campus. Contemporaries ranked her among the greatest of first ladies. In 1982, the Siena College Research Institute polled historians on the performances of first ladies; Cleveland was placed 13th out of 42, but the 2008 edition of the poll placed her 20th of 38. The most recent survey (conducted in 2020) ranked her 26th of 40.

=== Fashion and image ===
Much of Cleveland's fame and media coverage focused on her appearance and her fashion, and her fashion choices were widely imitated by women throughout the United States. These included her hairstyle, a low knot over a shaved nape, which became known as the à la Cleveland. Her fashion choices and purchases influenced the behavior of consumers, and products she reportedly used enjoyed an increase in popularity. An article published by the Atlanta Constitution falsely stated that she no longer purchased bustles, causing a decline in their popularity. The Woman's Christian Temperance Union wrote to her requesting that she dress more modestly, fearing that she was setting a poor example. She declined to do so.

Cleveland's immense popularity led to the extensive use of her image in advertising, and many products falsely claimed to have her endorsement. It became such a problem that a bill was introduced to Congress that would establish personality rights for women and criminalize the unauthorized use of a person's image, but the bill did not pass. Cleveland updated her fashion choices during her husband's second term. Reflecting the trends of the Gay Nineties, she wore tight gowns, feather boas, and picture hats. News articles on her activities continued to reference her sense of fashion in her old age.

=== Politics ===
Although she was personally interested in politics, Cleveland did not publicly support political causes while serving as first lady. One exception to her avoidance of politics was her interest in the political situation of the Republic of Hawaii, where she endorsed the restoration of monarchy with Princess Ka'iulani's claim to the throne as the heir apparent. She also supported the temperance movement, personally abstaining from alcohol and donating to the Woman's Christian Temperance Union, but she was unwilling to impose these beliefs on others and continued to serve wine at White House receptions.

She worked with charity groups, including the Needlework Guild, which made clothes for the poor, and the Christmas Club and the Colored Christmas Club, which gave gifts to children during the holiday season. Cleveland's activism focused heavily on the arts, and she was a supporter of international copyright protections, attending a convention on the subject while first lady in 1888. She also provided charitable support, sponsoring many aspiring musicians.

Cleveland supported women's education and believed it to be an important step in gender equality. She did not support women's suffrage, and she avoided commenting on the controversial issue during her tenure as first lady. Like many female anti-suffragists of her generation, she felt that politics was an unfortunate duty to be avoided and that it risked women's control of the domestic sphere. Despite this, she chose to vote in elections after the ratification of the Nineteenth Amendment.

== See also ==
- Bibliography of United States presidential spouses and first ladies

Honorary titles
Preceded by Rose Cleveland; Acting	First Lady of the United States; 1886–1889	Succeeded by Caroline Harrison
Preceded by Mary Harrison McKee; Acting	First Lady of the United States; 1893–1897	Succeeded by Ida Saxton McKinley
