= Tekoa Mountain (Massachusetts) =

Mountain in the U.S. state of Massachusetts

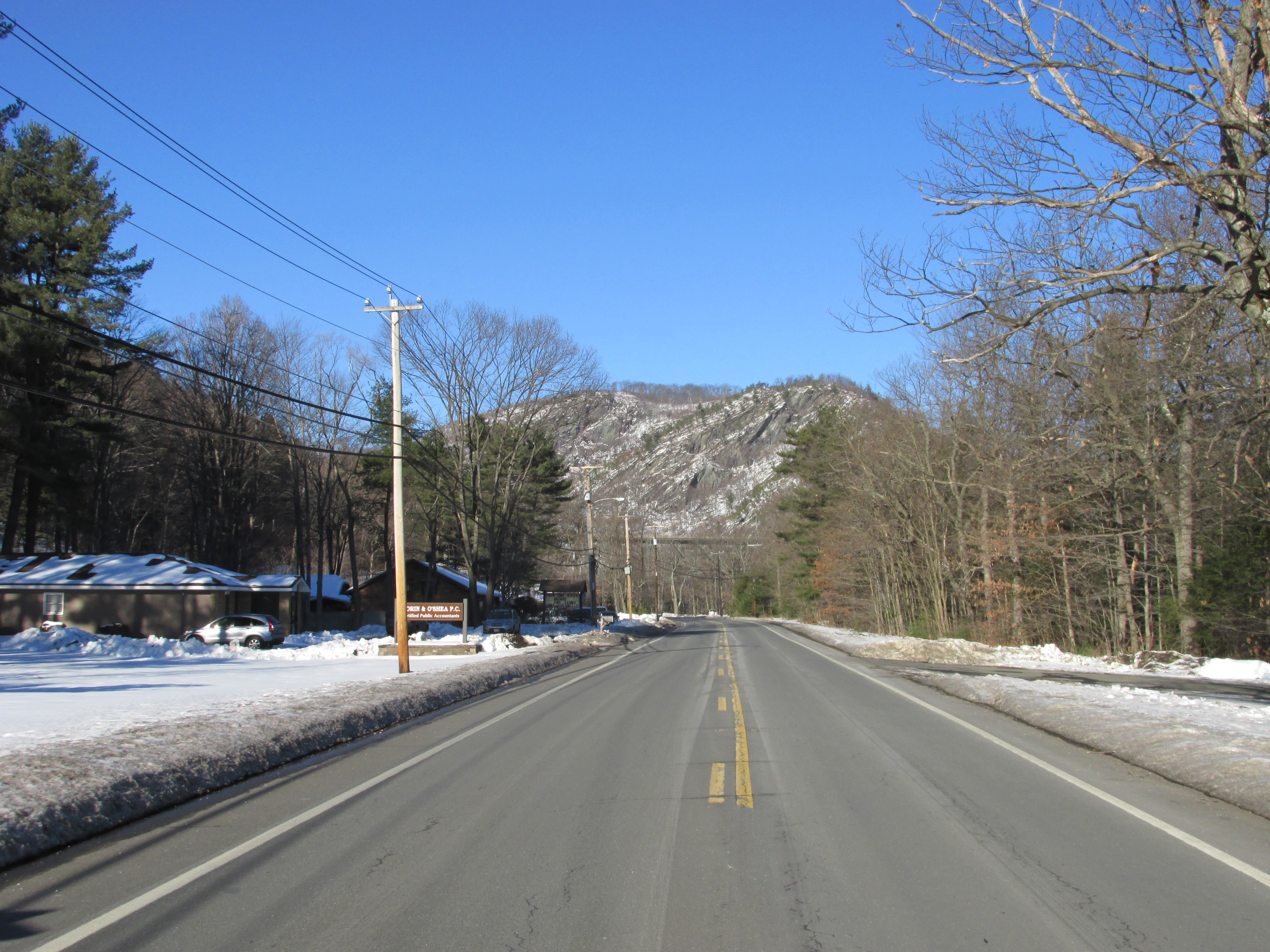
- South face of Tekoa Mountain

Highest point
- Elevation: 1,121 ft (342 m)
- Parent peak: 42° 10' 07"N, 72° 48' 47"W
- Coordinates: 42°10′07″N 72°48′47″W

Naming
- English translation: "Trumpet blast" or "place of fastening down"
- Language of name: Hebrew

Geography
- Location: Montgomery and Russell, Massachusetts
- Parent range: Berkshires

Geology
- Mountain type: Metamorphic rock

Climbing
- Easiest route: White dot trail starting near the tracks by the Mass Pike bridge.

Tekoa Mountain, 1,121 feet (342 m), is a dramatic, rocky high point overlooking the Westfield River Gorge at the eastern edge of the Berkshire plateau in the towns of Montgomery and Russell, Massachusetts, USA. Tekoa Mountain, very prominent from the "Jacob's Ladder" section of U.S. Route 20 in the town of Russell, is not a true mountain but a cleaver jutting from a dissected plateau; it was produced by glacial action and through continuous erosion by the Westfield River and Moose Meadow Brook before and after the last ice age.

With nearby Shatterack Mountain, another cleaver, Tekoa Mountain forms a 700 ft (210 m) high knobby cliff face and gorge wall along the northeast side of the Westfield River as it plunges from the Berkshire Mountains of western Massachusetts into the Connecticut River Valley. Much of the face of Tekoa Mountain is barren or populated by sparse tree cover exacerbated by frequent fires which support partially fire-dependent tree species such as pitch pine and scrub oak. The mountain is also the habitat of the New England cottontail, a species in decline in Massachusetts. Tekoa Mountain has been targeted by the United States Fish and Wildlife Service's Connecticut River Valley conservation plan as a "high priority" ecosystem.

== Geography ==
Tekoa Mountain overlooks the Westfield River Gorge and the Connecticut River Valley. The town of Russell and its villages, Woronoco and Crescent Mills, lie at the foot of the mountain along the Westfield River. From the summit ledges, the cities of Westfield and Springfield, Massachusetts are visible to the east. The southwest and northeast sides of Tekoa Mountain are steep and rugged with frequent cliff faces and rocky overlooks; to the north, the topography gradually flattens out as Tekoa Mountain merges with the upland plateau of Montgomery. The southwest side of Tekoa Mountain drains into the Westfield River, thence into the Connecticut River and Long Island Sound; the northeast side drains into Moose Meadow Brook, thence the Westfield River.

== History ==
The Tekoa Mountain region was originally inhabited by Native Americans of the Woronoake tribe. During the American Revolutionary War, the north (plateau) side of the mountain was the location of a secret, pro-revolution musket factory operated by early 18th century settler Richard Falley Jr.(slag may be found in the vicinity of the former "musket factory") a home belonging to Falley was located at the base of Tekoa Mountain, more information can be obtained at the Westfield Athenaeum; the summit was used as a lookout to watch for British spies. Tekoa Mountain was named after the biblical fortress and settlement of Tekoa, translated alternately as a place "fastening down" or "a trumpet blast." According to 2 Books of Chronicles 11:5, Tekoa was built as a city for the defense of Judah; a high place, its elevation offered a strategic military advantage and provided a vantage point from which to send signals to Jerusalem and other allied cities. It is unknown if the mountain was named with this history in mind.

== Recreation ==
Much of Tekoa Mountain lies within the Tekoa Mountain Wildlife Management Area, managed by the Division of Fisheries and Wildlife. The eastern portion of the mountain are part of the Westfield Watershed lands, owned by the City of Westfield, with public access provided under a Conservation Easement to the Division of Fisheries and Wildlife. These areas are open to hunting, hiking and other forms of non-motorized recreation. There are a few in-holdings of privately owned land. A number of unofficial trails and woods roads traverse Mount Tekoa, however, no officially designated or maintained trails exist. All motorized vehicles, including ATVs, are prohibited from the Wildlife Management Area and Watershed lands. The mountain and surrounding highland is part of a conservation effort by the U.S. Fish and Wildlife Service to secure critical habitats along the greater Connecticut River Valley.
