= Richard F. Cleveland =

American lawyer (1897–1974)

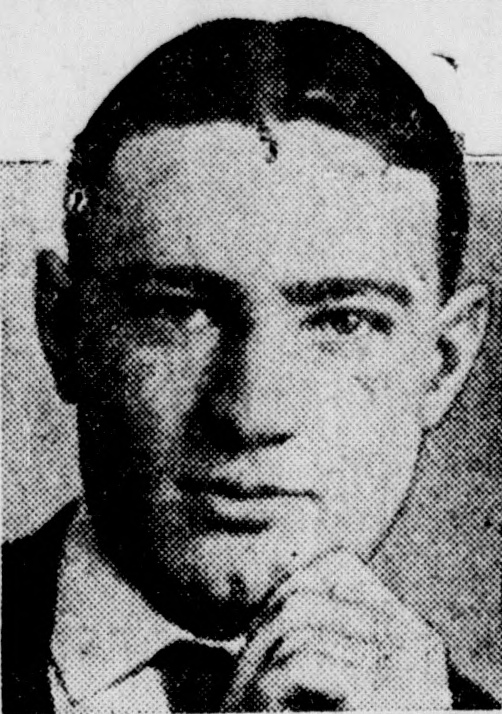
- Cleveland c. 1918
- Born: Richard Folsom Cleveland; October 28, 1897; Princeton, New Jersey, U.S.
- Died: January 10, 1974 (aged 76); Baltimore, Maryland, U.S.
- Education: Phillips Exeter Academy; Princeton University; Harvard Law School
- Occupations: Lawyer, civic leader
- Years active: 1924–1974
- Employer: Semmes, Bowen & Semmes
- Known for: Defended Whittaker Chambers during Hiss Case
- Spouses: Ellen Douglass Gailor (m. 1923; div. 1940) Jessie Maxwell Black (m. 1943)
- Children: 6
- Parents: Grover Cleveland; Frances Folsom Cleveland
- Relatives: Esther Cleveland (sister); Ruth Cleveland (sister); Lewis F. Allen (great-uncle); Rose Cleveland (aunt); Philippa Foot (niece)

Richard Folsom Cleveland (October 28, 1897 – January 10, 1974) was an American lawyer and civic leader who spent his career with the law firm of Semmes, Bowen & Semmes. He was the son of President Grover Cleveland. Whittaker Chambers considered him critical to the successful outcome of the Hiss Case.

== Early life ==
Cleveland was born in Princeton, New Jersey, the second youngest son of Grover Cleveland, the 22nd and 24th President of the United States, and Frances Folsom. He was born nearly eight months after the end of his father's second term, and was named for his grandfather, Richard Falley Cleveland. He was the next to youngest of five siblings: sisters Ruth (1891–1904), Esther (1893–1980), and Marion (1895–1977), and brother Francis Grover (1903–1995).

He attended Phillips Exeter Academy and in 1915, he entered Princeton University, became freshman class president, and played on the freshman football team.

== Career ==
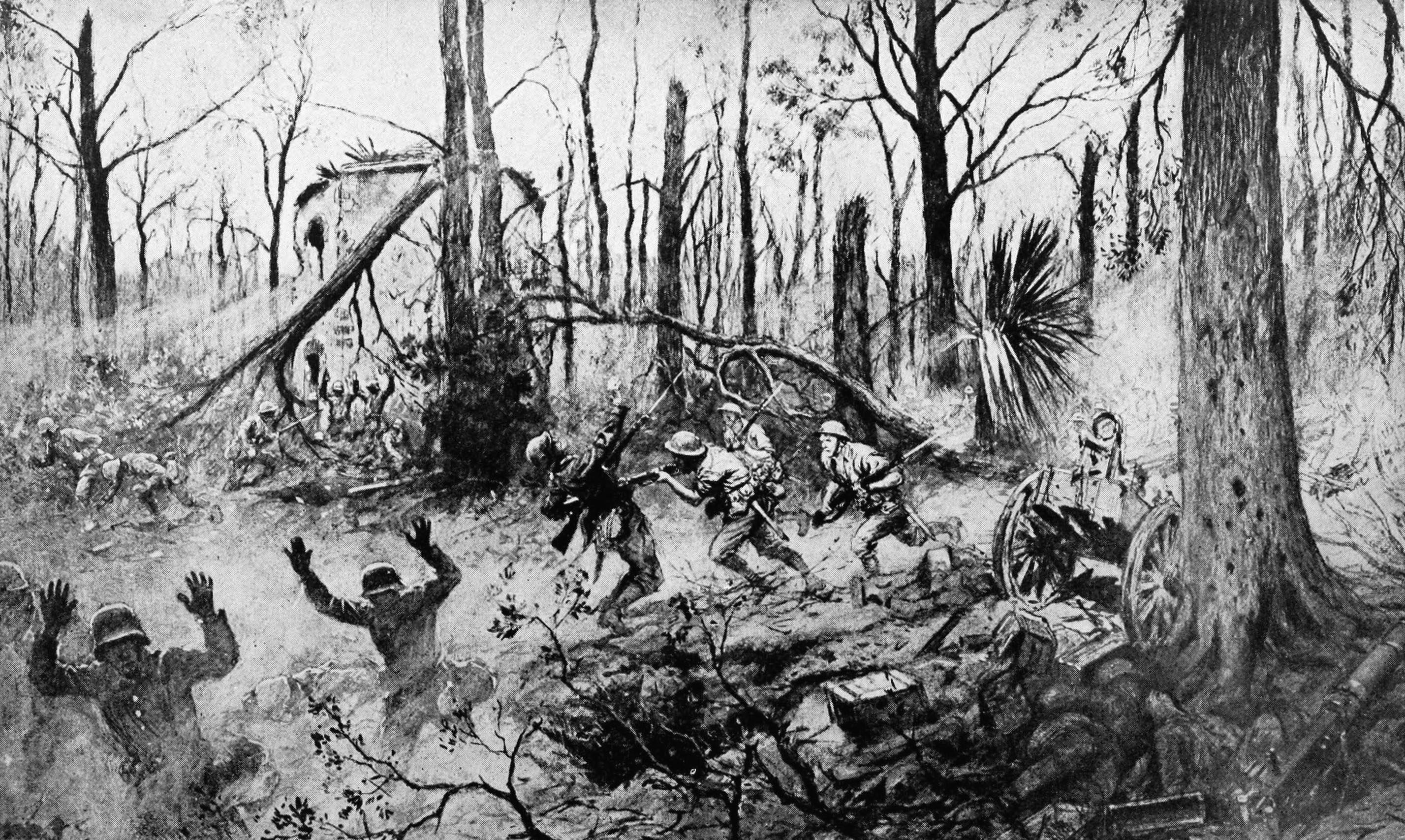
US Marines at Belleau Wood

In 1916 or 1917, Cleveland broke off studies and joined the U.S. Marine Corps during World War I. In 1918, he joined the U.S. diplomatic corps and served in six months in Beijing (then still called "Peking") as military attache at the U.S. legation.

Later that year, he returned to Princeton and graduated in 1919. In 1921, he obtained an MA from Princeton and then enrolled in Harvard Law School.

=== Law ===
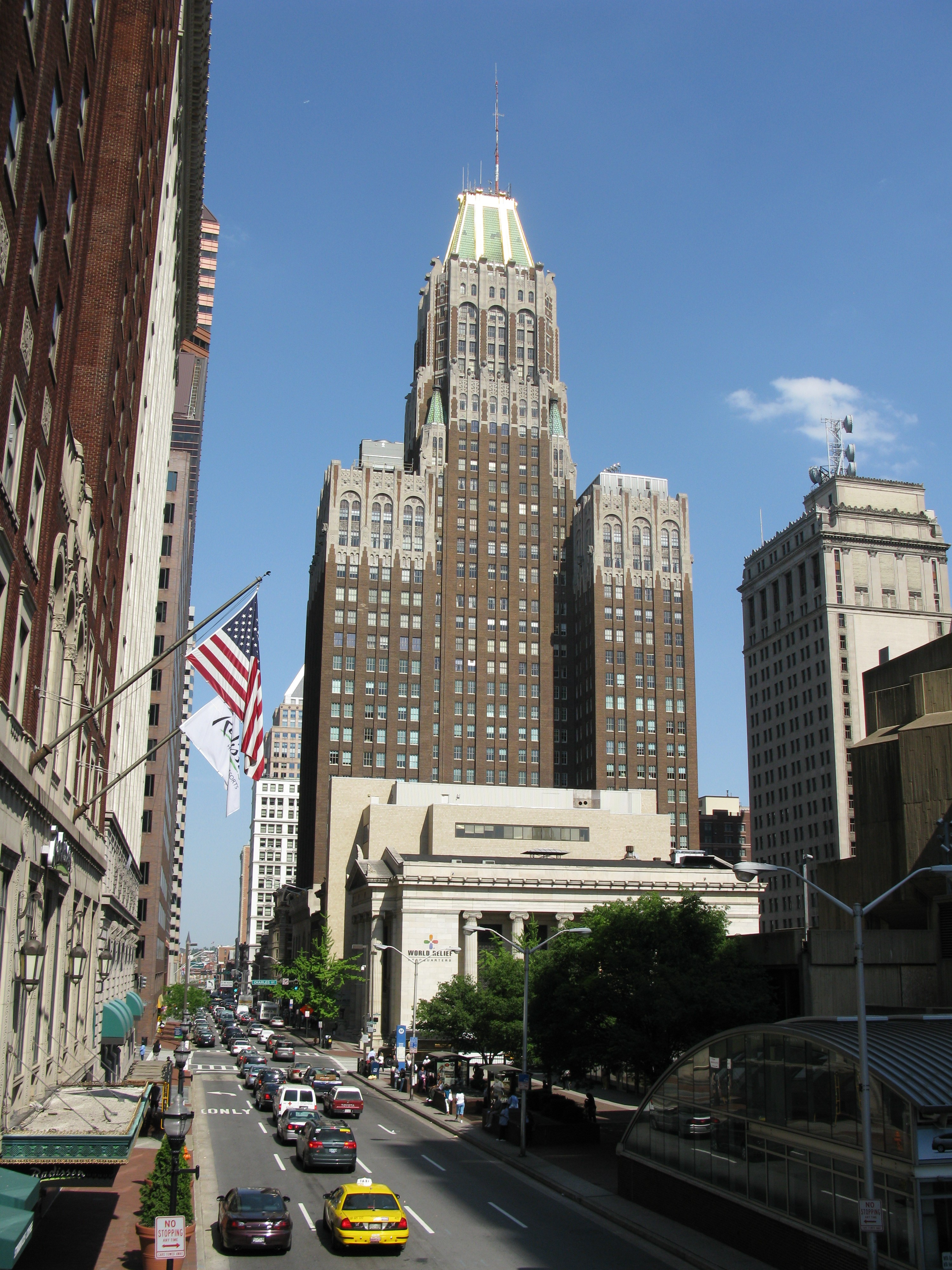
Baltimore Trust Building

In 1924, he joined the law firm of Semmes, Bowen & Semmes in Baltimore, Maryland. He worked there throughout his career. Though he retired in 1969, he continued to work part-time at the firm until his death in 1974.

During those years, Semmes, Bowen and Semmes occupied the twenty-first floor at 10 Light Street, at what was called the "Baltimore Trust Building," then the tallest building south of Manhattan (now the "Bank of America Building").

=== Hiss Case ===
During the Hiss Case (1948–1950), Cleveland represented Time senior editor Whittaker Chambers. In his memoir, Chambers recalled of him:

The names of a number of other Baltimore attorneys were given me from which to make my choice of counsel. I listened to as many first-hand opinions as possible about all of them. Then I decided on the man whom I had decided on the first time that I read over the list—Richard F. Cleveland, the youngest son of the former President of the United States, Grover Cleveland, and a partner in the Baltimore law firm of Semmes, Bowen and Semmes.
Until his name was handed to me, I had never heard of him. Yet it is hard to imagine that any other man could conceivably have filled the role that was thrust upon this quiet, deliberate, shrewd, deeply devout and deeply understanding gentleman.

From the first, he sensed that there was something missing in the Hiss Case. From the moment that I confirmed his intuition and told him what that missing factor was—espionage—he grasped the Case in its full meaning. He understood exactly what I had to do and why I was doing it.

Twice, at least, his words reaching me when he himself was not present, bore me up in critical moments. His letter, which was handed me by the FBI a few moments before I went in to testify in the first Hiss trial, offering me the support of a shared understanding and the force of his prayers, was a powerful help to me during my public evisceration by Lloyd Paul Stryker.

The other occasion was of a kind that no man could ever forget. It occurred in December 1948, during my days before the Grand Jury, when the outcry against me was deafening. Richard Cleveland and his wife had driven from Baltimore to our farm. If any conscious factor had influenced my choice of Cleveland as my lawyer, it was my respect for his father. To my gentle wife for whom in her loneliness that dark moment was darker than for me, Cleveland said in his gentle way: "In many ways, Whittaker reminds me of my father." It was, of course, the measure of Richard Cleveland, not of me.

Chambers was impressed by Cleveland's legal acuity:

I was sitting alone one day with Richard Cleveland. Once more he led me over parts of the story. After a time, he paused and gazed off toward Druid Hill Park.

"You feel, don't you, that there is something missing?" I asked.

"I was discussing the case with my wife last night," he said, "and we both agreed that there was something missing."

"There is something missing," I said. "I am shielding Hiss."

Cleveland glanced at me over his half-glasses as he sometimes did.

"Espionage," I said.

=== Politics ===
Cleveland supported the presidential candidacies of Franklin Delano Roosevelt, Alfred M. Landon, Wendell L. Willkie, and Dwight D. Eisenhower.

In 1967, he served as a delegate to the Maryland Constitutional Convention.

== Personal life ==
In 1923, Cleveland married Ellen Douglass Gailor (d. 1954), daughter of Thomas F. Gailor, an Episcopal bishop in Tennessee, after having met her abroad. Ellen, a teacher, was a graduate of Vassar College and Columbia University, where she received a master's degree. Before divorcing in 1940 due to Ellen's alcoholism, they had three children:

- Anne Mary Cleveland
- Thomas Grover Cleveland(Oct 18, 1927 – Mar 20, 2020)
- Charlotte Gailor Cleveland

In 1943, he married Jessie Maxwell Black, the daughter of Capt. and Mrs. George Crosbie Black. They had three children:

- Frances Black Cleveland (Franma)
- George Maxwell Cleveland
- Margaret Folsom Cleveland (March 10, 1956 – August 3, 2021)

He used the desk his father had used in the White House as president, and so it remained in the offices of Semmes, Bowen & Semmes because he was still working there as emeritus partner at the firm in 1974 when he died.

Cleveland was rather relieved upon meeting Chambers, as Chambers recounted:

My first interview with Cleveland and Macmillan was chiefly to give them a chance to look me over and to listen to my story before they decided to accept me as a client. I found that I came as something of a relief. "To tell the truth," said Cleveland as we parted that first day, "Bill and I were a little worried. When we heard that you were an ex-Communist, we expected a wild-eyed man without a necktie. You are quite a surprise.

His first wife, Ellen, died in 1954. He died in Baltimore on January 10, 1974, of chronic pulmonary illness. He is buried at Stevenson Cemetery in Tamworth, New Hampshire.

== See also ==
- Grover Cleveland
- Frances Folsom
- Esther Cleveland
- Ruth Cleveland
- Lewis F. Allen
- Rose Cleveland
- Philippa Foot
- Whittaker Chambers
- Alger Hiss
- Lloyd Paul Stryker
