= Thomas J. Preston Jr. =

American archeologist (1862–1955)

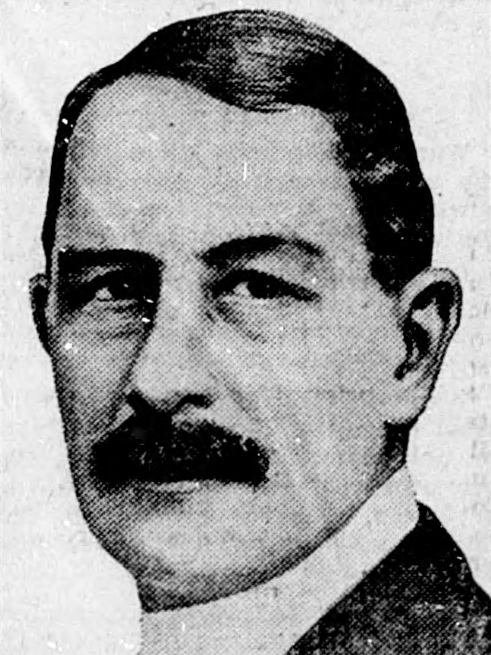
- Born: October 26, 1862; Hastings on Hudson, New York, U.S.
- Died: December 25, 1955 (aged 93); South Orange, New Jersey, U.S.
- Education: Princeton University; Sorbonne University; University of Rome; American Academy in Rome
- Occupations: Archeology professor, academic administrator
- Spouse: Frances Folsom Cleveland (m. 1913; died 1947)

Thomas Jex Preston Jr. (October 26, 1862 – December 25, 1955) was an American archeology professor and academic administrator.

== Early life ==
Preston was born on October 26, 1862, in Hastings on Hudson, New York. He graduated from Princeton University, where he was elected to Phi Beta Kappa and earned a bachelor's degree followed by a master's degree and a PhD. He also studied abroad at the Sorbonne University for two years, and at the University of Rome.

== Career ==
Preston began his career as a businessman for a manufacturing concern in Newark, New Jersey. He left the business world after "amassing a comfortable fortune."

Preston was a professor of archeology at Princeton University in 1911–1912. He also served as the president pro tem of Wells College in Aurora, New York.

Preston was a fellow of the American Academy in Rome and the Archaeological Institute of America.

== Personal life ==
On February 10, 1913, Preston married Frances Folsom Cleveland, the widow of President Grover Cleveland, at the Prospect House in Princeton, New Jersey.

Preston died on December 25, 1955, in South Orange, New Jersey, at age 93.

== Published works ==
- Preston, Thomas Jex, The bronze doors of Monte Cassino and of St. Paul's Rome, Princeton University Press, 1915. Ph.D. dissertation was published in 1915.
