= Ruth Cleveland =

Daughter of Grover Cleveland (1891–1904)

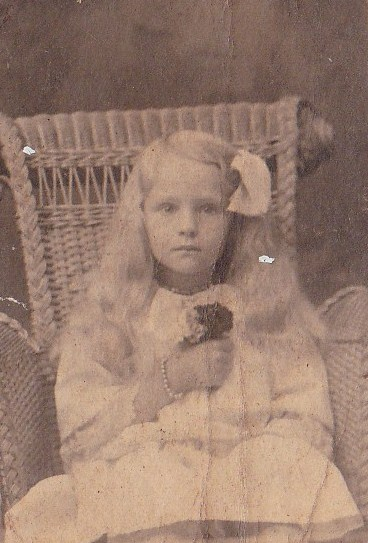
- Cleveland circa 1897
- Born: Ruth Eva Cleveland; October 3, 1891; New York City, U.S.
- Died: January 7, 1904 (aged 12); Princeton, New Jersey, U.S.
- Resting place: Princeton Cemetery
- Education: Miss Fine's School
- Parent(s): Grover Cleveland; Frances Cleveland
- Relatives: Esther Cleveland (sister); Richard F. Cleveland (brother); Rose Cleveland (aunt)

Ruth Eva Cleveland (October 3, 1891 – January 7, 1904), popularly known as Baby Ruth, was the eldest of five children born to 22nd and 24th United States president Grover Cleveland and First Lady Frances Cleveland.

== Biography ==
Cleveland was born in New York City, lived at the White House and Gray Gables, the family's summer home on Cape Cod. After her father's second term she moved with her family to Westland Mansion in Princeton, New Jersey, where she attended Miss Fine's School, and died at an early age.

Ruth's birth between Cleveland's two terms of office caused a national sensation. At a Boston flower show over 40 chrysanthemum varieties were named in her honor. Frances dedicated herself to the child, taking on many of the roles that a woman of her status would have typically given to a nurse. The family did not permit professional photos and expected discretion from amateurs.

In the 1892 United States presidential election Ruth and Benjamin Harrison's grandson, Benjamin Harrison McKee, known as Baby McKee, were drawn into campaign competition. One placard declared: Vote for Papa! A song written about them included the lyrics:

We’re Baby Ruth and Baby McKee,
Lively specimens, you’ll agree
Just as happy as happy can be,
We’ll run the nation’s Presidency!
Which of us wins you’ll very soon see,
Baby Ruth and Baby McKee.

A sickly child, Ruth Cleveland contracted diphtheria on January 2, 1904. Doctors thought her case was mild, but she died of heart failure five days after her diagnosis. She is buried in Princeton Cemetery. Following doctor's advice, Mrs. Cleveland did not attend the funeral; Woodrow Wilson, at the time the president of Princeton University, was present. The family never returned to Gray Gables after Ruth's death.

== Namesake for the Baby Ruth candy bar ==
The Curtiss Candy Company asserted that the "Baby Ruth" candy bar was named after Ruth Cleveland, after being sued by Babe Ruth for using his name without compensation. As she had died 17 years earlier and was born to a president who was last in office in 1897, it remains highly unlikely that this explanation was anything more than a way to avoid litigation. Known as "Kandy Kake" from 1900 to 1920, the candy bar was renamed in 1921, thirty years after Ruth Cleveland's birth and seventeen years after her death. That same year, legendary baseball player George Herman Ruth, better known by the nickname Babe Ruth, was nearing the top of his popularity, having just broken the single-season home run record.

As Richard Sandomir of The New York Times pointed out, "For 85 years, Babe Ruth, the slugger, and Baby Ruth, the candy bar, have lived parallel lives in which it has been widely assumed that the latter was named for the former. The confection's creator, the Curtiss Candy Company, never admitted to what looks like an obvious connection – especially since Ruth hit 54 home runs the year before the first Baby Ruth was devoured. Had it done so, Curtiss would have had to compensate Ruth. Instead, it eventually insisted the inspiration was 'Baby Ruth' Cleveland, the daughter of President Grover Cleveland. But it is an odd connection that makes one wonder at the marketing savvy of Otto Schnering, the company's founder."

Ruth sued the candy company, claiming the candy bar was using his name and not Ruth Cleveland's, but lost the case in 1931.

== See also ==
- List of children of presidents of the United States
