= Esther Cleveland =

Daughter of Grover Cleveland (1893–1980)

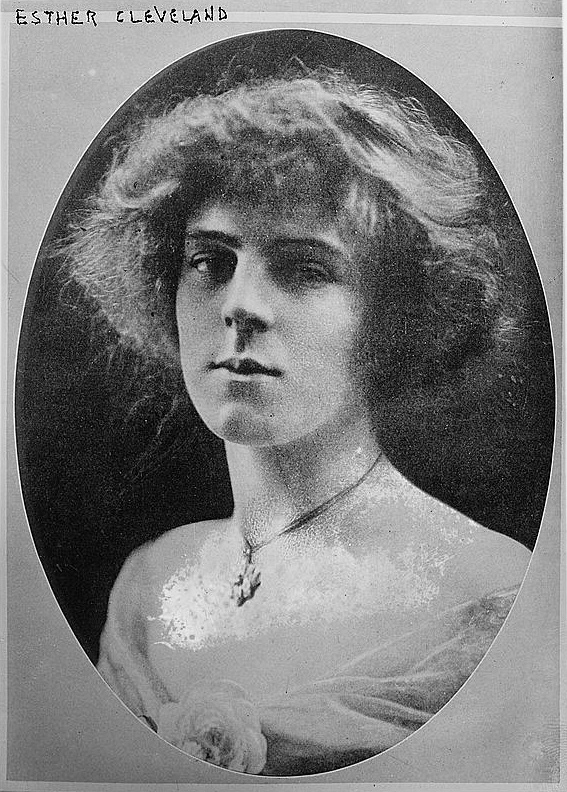
- Esther Cleveland, c. 1920
- Born: September 9, 1893; Washington, D.C., U.S.
- Died: June 25, 1980 (aged 86); Tamworth, New Hampshire, U.S.
- Spouse: Captain William Sidney Bence Bosanquet (m. 1918; died 1966)
- Children: 2, including Philippa
- Parent(s): Grover Cleveland (father); Frances Folsom (mother)
- Relatives: Ruth Cleveland (sister); Marion Cleveland (sister); Richard F. Cleveland (brother); Rose Cleveland (paternal aunt); Albert Bosanquet (father-in-law)

Esther Cleveland (September 9, 1893 – June 25, 1980) was the second child of Grover Cleveland, 22nd and 24th President of the United States, and his wife Frances Folsom Cleveland.

== Biography ==
Esther Cleveland was born on September 9, 1893, in the White House, to the President of the United States, Grover Cleveland, and First Lady Frances Folsom, during her father's second presidency. She was the first child to be born to an incumbent US President and First Lady (the only others being her sister Marion [1895–1977] and the short-lived Patrick Bouvier Kennedy [b. & d. 1963]), remains the only child of a president to have been born in the White House, and was nicknamed "the White House baby" as a result. In April 1896, she contracted measles when it spread through the White House, leading to a quarantine. Five years later, she contracted diphtheria.

She made her debut in 1912 and was rumored to be engaged to Randolph D. West shortly after (which was denied by her relatives). On March 14, 1918, at Westminster Abbey, she married Captain William Sidney Bence Bosanquet (May 9, 1883 – March 5, 1966) of the Coldstream Guards of the British Army. He had liaised with the US over steel production and was the son of Sir Albert Bosanquet, the Common Serjeant of London. After WWII he was the manager of Skinningrove Iron Works in East Cleveland, England. They lived in Kirkleatham Old Hall, now Kirkleatham Museum, on the outskirts of Redcar. They bought the whole building in 1930 after half of it was initially occupied by soldiers. Following his death, she returned to the United States and she sold the house to the local Council in 1970.

As Mrs. Bosanquet, she was known locally in the 1940s and 1950s for her philanthropy. Esther bridged the divergent views of her mother's opposition to suffrage, stemming from Frances Cleveland's belief that women were not ready to vote, through to supporting her daughter who went to Somerville College, Oxford. She was the mother of British philosopher Philippa Foot, who was a fellow at Oxford before holding several professorships in the United States. Philippa Foot clearly had a sense of liberation from early governess education to high academic success. She said that she learned nothing from home tuition in Kirkleatham. It was "the sort of milieu where there was a lot of hunting, shooting, and fishing, and where girls simply did not go to college." Nevertheless, she had the subsequent financial support from Esther and William Bosanquet to go to school in Ascot and later to Oxford.

Esther Cleveland Bosanquet died in Tamworth, New Hampshire, on June 25, 1980, at the age of 86.
