= Philippa Foot =

English philosopher (1920–2010)

Philippa Foot FBA
- Foot in 1939
- Born: Philippa Ruth Bosanquet; 3 October 1920; Owston Ferry, Lincolnshire, England
- Died: 3 October 2010 (aged 90); Oxford, England
- Spouse: M. R. D. Foot (m. 1945; div. 1960)
- Mother: Esther Cleveland

Education
- Education: Somerville College, Oxford
- Academic advisors: Elizabeth Anscombe; Donald M. MacKinnon

Philosophical work
- Era: 20th-century philosophy
- Region: Western philosophy
- School: Analytic philosophy Aretaic turn Aristotelianism
- Institutions: Somerville College, Oxford; UCLA
- Main interests: Ethics, aesthetics
- Notable ideas: Trolley problem, modern revival of virtue ethics, critique of non-cognitivism

Philippa Ruth Foot (née Bosanquet; 3 October 1920 – 3 October 2010) was an English philosopher and one of the founders of contemporary virtue ethics. Her work was inspired by Aristotelian ethics. Along with Judith Jarvis Thomson, she is credited with inventing the trolley problem.

== Biography ==
=== Early life and education ===
Born Philippa Ruth Bosanquet in Owston Ferry, North Lincolnshire, she was the daughter of Esther Cleveland (1893–1980) and Captain William Sidney Bence Bosanquet (1893–1966) of the Coldstream Guards of the British Army. Her paternal grandfather was barrister and judge Sir Frederick Albert Bosanquet, Common Serjeant of London from 1900 to 1917. Her maternal grandfather was the 22nd and 24th President of the United States, Grover Cleveland.

Foot was educated privately and at Somerville College, Oxford, 1939–1942, where she attained a first-class degree in philosophy, politics, and economics.

=== Career ===
Her association with Somerville, interrupted only by government service as an economist from 1942 to 1947, continued for the rest of her life. She was a lecturer in philosophy, 1947–1950; fellow and tutor, 1950–1969; senior research fellow, 1969–1988; and honorary fellow, 1988–2010. She spent many hours there in debate with G. E. M. Anscombe and learnt from her about Wittgenstein's analytic philosophy and a new moral perspective: Foot said "I learned every thing from her".

In the 1960s and 1970s, Foot held a number of visiting professorships in the United States, including at Cornell, MIT, Berkeley, and City University of New York. She was appointed Griffin Professor of Philosophy at the University of California, Los Angeles in 1976 and taught there until 1991, dividing her time between the United States and Britain.

Contrary to common belief, Foot was not a founder of Oxfam. She joined the organization about six years after its foundation. She was an atheist. She was once married to the historian M. R. D. Foot, and at one time shared a flat with the philosopher and novelist Iris Murdoch. She died in 2010 on her 90th birthday.

She lived at 15 Walton Street from 1972 until 2010, and is commemorated by an Oxfordshire Blue Plaque on the house.

== Philosophy ==
=== Critique of non-cognitivism ===
Foot's work in the 1950s and 1960s sought to revive Aristotelian ethics in modernity, competing with its major rivals, modern deontology and consequentialism (the latter a term dubbed by Anscombe). Some of her work was crucial to a re-emergence of normative ethics within analytic philosophy, notably her critiques of consequentialism, (meta-ethical) non-cognitivism, and Nietzsche. Foot's approach was influenced by the later work of Wittgenstein, although she seldom dealt explicitly with his materials. She had the opportunity to listen to Wittgenstein lecture once or twice.

In her earlier career, Foot's works (especially her essays "Moral Arguments" and "Moral Beliefs") were meta-ethical in character, pertaining to the nature and status of moral judgment and language.

Though non-cognitivism may be traced back to David Hume's is–ought problem, its most explicit formulations are found in the works of A. J. Ayer, C. L. Stevenson, and R. M. Hare, who focused on abstract or "thin" ethical concepts such as good/bad and right/wrong. They argued that moral judgments do not express propositions, i.e., that they are not truth-apt, but express emotions or imperatives. Thus, fact and value are independent of each other.

This analysis of abstract or "thin" ethical concepts was contrasted with more concrete or "thick" concepts, such as cowardice, cruelty, and gluttony. Such attributes do not swing free of the facts, yet they carry the same "practicality" that "bad" or "wrong" do. They were intended to combine the particular, non-cognitive "evaluative" element championed by the theory with the descriptive element. One could detach the evaluative force by employing them in an "inverted commas sense", as one does in attempting to articulate thoughts in a system one opposes, for example by putting "unmanly" or "unladylike" in quotation marks. That leaves purely descriptive expressions that apply to actions, whereas employing such expressions without the quotation marks would add the non-cognitive extra of "and such action is bad".

Foot objected to this distinction and its underlying account of thin concepts. Her defense of the cognitive and truth-evaluable character of moral judgment made the essays crucial in bringing the question of the rationality of morality to the fore.

Practical considerations involving "thick" ethical concepts – "but it would be cruel", "it would be cowardly", "it's for her to do", or "I promised her I wouldn't do it" – move people to act one way rather than another, but remain as purely descriptive as any other judgment pertaining to human life. They differ from thoughts such as "it would be done on a Tuesday" or "it would take about three gallons of paint" not by admixing what she considers a non-factual, attitude-expressing, "moral" element, but simply by the fact that people have reason not to do things that are cowardly or cruel. Her lifelong devotion to the question is apparent in all periods of her work.

=== Morality and reasons ===
It is on the "why be moral?" question (which for her may be said to divide into the questions "why be just?", "why be temperate?", etc.) that her doctrine underwent a series of reversals.

In "Moral Beliefs", Foot argued that the received virtues – courage, temperance, justice, and so on – are typically good for their bearer. They make people stronger, so to speak, and condition to happiness. This holds only typically, since the courage of a soldier, for instance, might happen to be precisely his downfall, yet is in some sense essential: possession of sound arms and legs is good as well. However, damaged legs may happen to exclude someone from conscription that assigns contemporaries to their deaths. So people have reason to act in line with the canons of these virtues and avoid cowardly, gluttonous, and unjust action. Parents and guardians who want the best for children will steer them accordingly.

Fifteen years later, in the essay "Morality as a System of Hypothetical Imperatives", she reversed this when it came to justice and benevolence, that is, the virtues that especially regard other people. Although everyone has reason to cultivate courage, temperance and prudence, whatever the person desires or values, still, the rationality of just and benevolent acts must, she thought, turn on contingent motivations. Although many found the thesis shocking, on her (then) account, it is meant to be, in a certain respect, inspiring: in a famous reinterpretation of a remark of Kant, she says that "we are not conscripts in the army of virtue, but volunteers"; the fact that we have nothing to say in proof of the irrationality of at least some unjust people should not alarm us in our own defence and cultivation of justice and benevolence: "it did not strike the citizens of Leningrad that their devotion to the city and its people during the terrible years of the siege was contingent".

=== Aesthetics ===
Nearly all Foot's published work relates to normative or meta-ethics. Only once did she move into aesthetics – in her 1970 British Academy Hertz Memorial Lecture, "Morality and Art", in which certain contrasts are drawn between moral and aesthetic judgements.

=== Ethics ===
Geoffrey Thomas of Birkbeck College, London, recalls approaching Foot in 1968, when he was a postgraduate at Trinity College, Oxford, to ask if she would read a draft paper on the relation of ethics to politics. "I've never found political philosophy interesting," she said, adding, "One's bound to interest oneself in the things people around one are talking about," so implying correctly that political philosophy was largely out of favour with Oxford philosophers in the 1950s and 1960s. She still agreed to read the paper, but Thomas never sent it.

== Works ==
- Virtues and Vices and Other Essays in Moral Philosophy, Berkeley: University of California Press/Oxford: Blackwell, 1978 (there are more recent editions)
- Natural Goodness. Oxford: Clarendon Press, 2001
- Moral Dilemmas: And Other Topics in Moral Philosophy, Oxford: Clarendon Press, 2002
- Morality and Art, The British Academy, read 20 May 1970, copyright 1971.
- Warren Quinn, Morality and Action, ed. Philippa Foot (Introduction, ix–xii), Cambridge: Cambridge University Press, 1993

== See also ==
- Judith Jarvis Thomson
- G. E. M. Anscombe
- Rosalind Hursthouse
- Thought experiment
- Trolley problem
