= Grover Cleveland Birthplace =

Historic house in New Jersey, United States

- Caldwell Presbyterian Church Manse
- U.S. National Register of Historic Places
- New Jersey Register of Historic Places
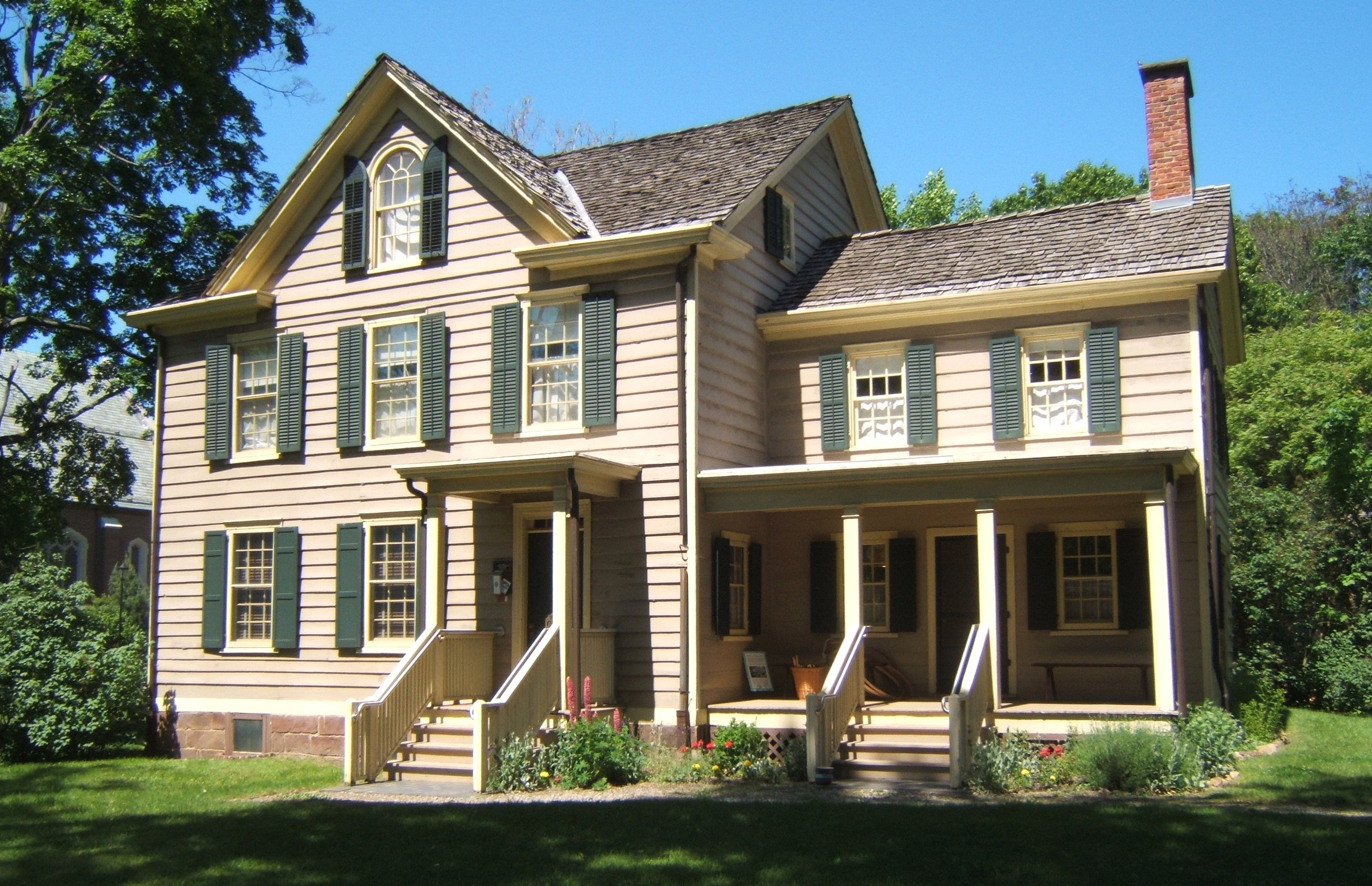

- Location within Essex County, New Jersey Location within New Jersey Location within the United States
- Location: 207 Bloomfield Avenue; Caldwell, NJ 07006
- Coordinates: 40°50′13″N 74°16′19″W
- Built: 1832
- Architectural style: Vernacular
- Website: https://presidentcleveland.org
- NRHP reference No.: 77000861
- NJRHP No.: 1070

Significant dates
- Added to NRHP: November 16, 1977
- Designated NJRHP: December 27, 1976

The Grover Cleveland Birthplace is a historic site located at 207 Bloomfield Avenue in Caldwell, Essex County, New Jersey, United States. It is the only house museum dedicated to U.S. President Grover Cleveland.

== History ==
Stephen Grover Cleveland was born in this home on March 18, 1837, the son of Rev. Richard Falley Cleveland and Ann Neal. The building, also known as the Caldwell Presbyterian Church Manse, was built in 1832 and served as a Presbyterian church parsonage for the Cleveland family while Grover's father served as a pastor of the First Presbyterian Church. The elder Cleveland had served in that role only three years before his son's birth but was only the second pastor in its establishment in 1787. The boy's first name was given in honor of the previous pastor, but he did not use the name Stephen in his adult life. Richard Cleveland found it was difficult to support his family of 11 on the $600 a year he earned in his role in Caldwell. The family moved to Buffalo, New York in 1841.

The Grover Cleveland Birthplace Memorial Association purchased the house in 1913 for use as a museum. In 1934, the state took over operation. It was documented by the Historic American Buildings Survey in 1936. The house was added to the National Register of Historic Places on November 16, 1977, for its significance in architecture, religion, and local history. It features vernacular architecture with touches of Federal styling.

Today, the home is open to the public as a museum. Its collection of artifacts include Cleveland's cradle and fishing gear as well as his chair from the White House.

== See also ==
- National Register of Historic Places listings in Essex County, New Jersey
- List of museums in New Jersey
- List of residences of presidents of the United States
- Presidential memorials in the United States
