= James E. King Jr. =

American doctor and presidential child

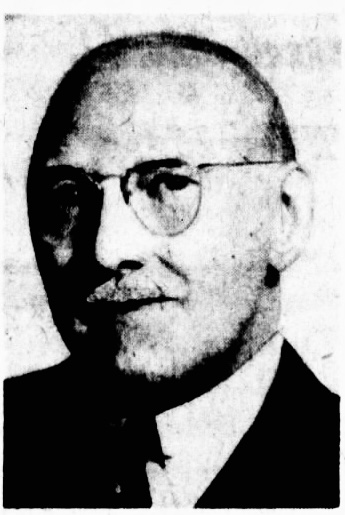
- Born: Oscar Folsom Cleveland; September 15, 1874; Buffalo, New York, U.S.
- Died: March 9, 1947 (aged 72); Buffalo, New York, U.S.
- Occupation: Physician
- Parents: Grover Cleveland; Maria Halpin
- Relatives: Ruth Cleveland (half-sister) Esther Cleveland (half-sister) Richard Cleveland (half-brother) Francis Cleveland (half-brother)

James Edward King Jr. (born Oscar Folsom Cleveland; September 15, 1874 – March 9, 1947), was the biological son of Maria Bertha Halpin and Grover Cleveland, the 22nd and 24th president of the United States. Cleveland made payments to Maria Halpin after the boy was born.

Grover Cleveland acknowledged that he was likely Oscar Folsom Cleveland's father. During the 1884 U.S. presidential election the controversy prompted Cleveland's opponents to adopt the chant, "Ma, ma, where's my pa?" The baby was adopted as James E. King Jr. into the family of Dr. James E. King Sr., the Buffalo, New York physician who supervised the asylum where Halpin was briefly confined. Dr. King (the younger, Oscar Folsom Cleveland) had a long career as a highly regarded obstetrician/gynecologist and medical school instructor; for many years he supervised Buffalo Women's Hospital (founded in 1885 as Buffalo Maternity Hospital). Dr. King was married to Rose A. Kleinschmidt Weber in 1910, but they were separated or divorced sometime before 1917, and had no children together. King enjoyed travel and frequently provided pro bono medical care to indigent women in the community.

== See also ==
- List of children of presidents of the United States
