= List of Victory ships (O) =

This is a list of Victory ships with names beginning with O.

== Description ==
A Victory ship was a cargo ship. The cargo ships were 455 feet 3 inches (138.76 m) overall, 436 feet 6 inches (133.05 m) between perpendiculars They had a beam of 62 feet 0 inches (18.90 m), a depth of 38 feet 0 inches (11.58 m) and a draught of 28 feet 0 inches (8.53 m). They were assessed at 7,612 GRT, 4,555 NRT and 10,750 DWT.

The ships were powered by a triple expansion steam engine, driving a steam turbine via double reduction gear. This gave the ship a speed of 15.5 knots (28.7 km/h) or 16.5 knots (30.6 km/h), depending on the machinery installed.

Liberty ships had five holds. No. 1 hold was 57 feet 6 inches (17.53 m) long, with a capacity of 81,715 cubic feet (2,313.9 m^{3}), No. 2 hold was 45 feet 0 inches (13.72 m) long, with a capacity of 89,370 cubic feet (2,531 m^{3}), No. 3 hold was 78 feet 0 inches (23.77 m) long, with a capacity of 158,000 cubic feet (4,500 m^{3}), No. 4 hold was 81 feet 0 inches (24.69 m) long, with a capacity of 89,370 cubic feet (2,531 m^{3}) and No. 5 hold was 75 feet 0 inches (22.86 m) long, with a capacity of 81,575 cubic feet (2,309.9 m^{3}).

In wartime service, they carried a crew of 62, plus 28 gunners. The ships carried four lifeboats. Two were powered, with a capacity of 27 people and two were unpowered, with a capacity of 29 people.

== Oberlin Victory ==
Oberlin Victory was built by Permanente Metals Corporation, Richmond, California. Her keel was laid on 31 January 1945. She was launched on 21 March and delivered on 20 April. Built for the War Shipping Administration (WSA), she was operated under the management of Matson Navigation Company. Laid up at Beaumont, Texas in 1949. Later transferred to the James River. She was scrapped at Kaohsiung, Taiwan in 1988.

== Ocala Victory ==
Ocala Victory was built by Bethlehem Fairfield Shipyard, Baltimore, Maryland. Her keel was laid on 24 October 1944. She was launched on 19 December and delivered on 22 January 1945. Built for the WSA, she was operated under the management of McCormick Steamship Company. Laid up at Astoria, Oregon in 1950. Returned to service in 1966 due to the Vietnam War. Operated under the management of Olympic Steamship Company. Laid up in Suisun Bay in 1973. She was scrapped at Huangpu, China in 1993.

== Occidental Victory ==
Occidental Victory was built by California Shipbuilding Corporation, Terminal Island, Los Angeles, California. Her keel was laid on 28 February 1945. She was launched on 23 April and delivered on 16 May. Built for the WSA, she was operated under the management of South Atlantic Steamship Lines. Laid up in Suisun Bay in 1947. Returned to service in 1966 due to the Vietnam War. Operated under the management of Matson Navigation Company. Laid up in Suisun Bay in 1973. She was scrapped at Brownsville, Texas in 2006.

== Oconto ==
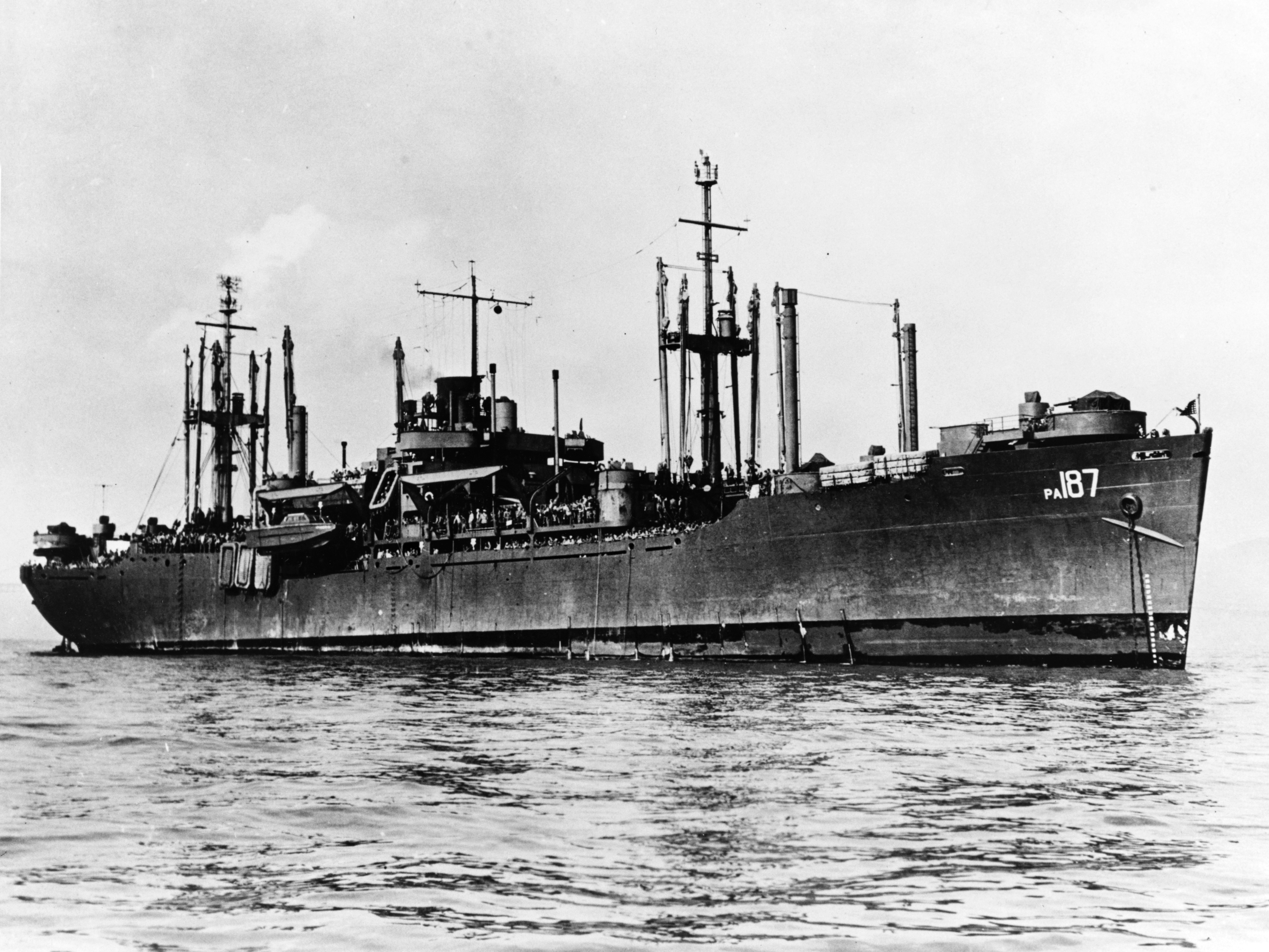
USS Oconto

Oconto was built by Kaiser Company, Vancouver, Washington. Her keel was laid on 5 April 1944. She was launched on 20 June and delivered on 2 September. Built for the United States Navy. To the United States Maritime Commission (USMC) in 1946 and laid up in the James River. She was scrapped in the United States in 1975.

== Oglethorpe Victory ==
Oglethorpe Victory was built by Oregon Shipbuilding Corporation, Portland, Oregon. Her keel was laid on 13 April 1945. She was launched on 29 May and delivered on 23 June. Built for the WSA, she was operated under the management of James Griffiths & Sons, Inc. Laid up in the Hudson River in 1948. Later transferred to Beaumont. Sold in 1949 to States Marine Corp., Wilmington, Delaware and renamed Buckeye State. Renamed Garden State in 1957. Sold in 1960 to Global Bulk Transport Inc., Wilmington, Delaware. Sold in 1970 to Reliance Carriers S.A., Panama and renamed Reliance Equality. She was scrapped at Kaohsiung in February 1971.

== Okaloosa ==
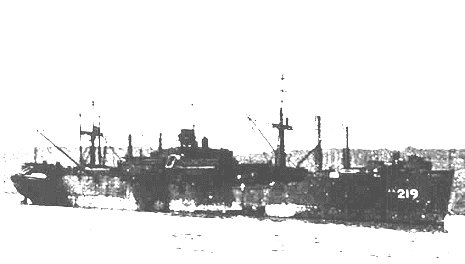
USS Okaloosa

Okaloosa was built by Permanente Metals Corporation. Her keel was laid on 6 August 1944. She was launched on 22 October and delivered on 28 November. Built for the United States Navy. Decommissioned on 1949 and laid up in reserve. To the United States Maritime Administration in 1959. Laid up at Mobile, Alabama. She was sold for scrapping at Panama City, Florida in October 1971, and was scrapped there in 1972.

== Okanogan ==
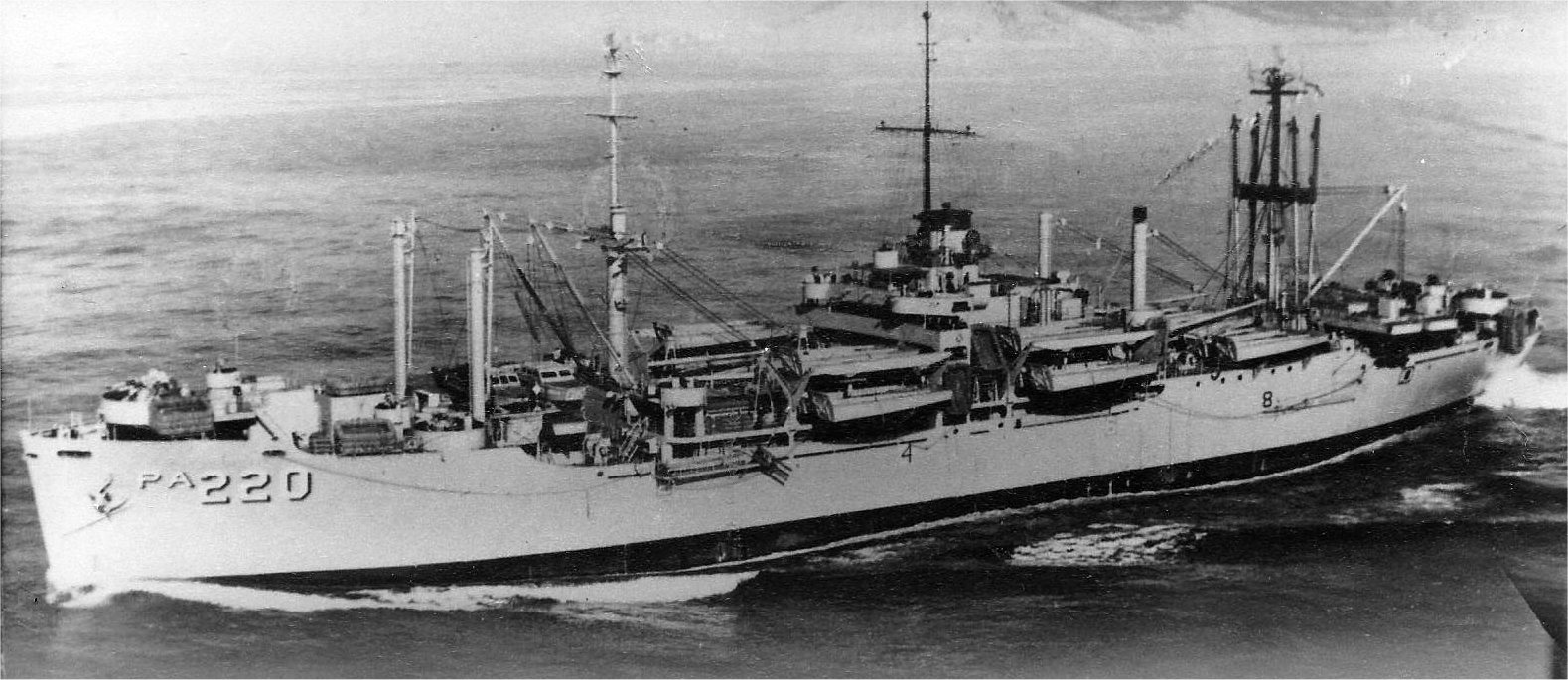
USS Okanogan

Okanogan was built by Permanente Metals Corporation. Her keel was laid on 10 August 1944. She was launched on 26 October and delivered on 30 November. Built for the United States Navy. Stricken in 1969, laid up in Suisun Bay in 1971. She was scrapped in 1979.

== Olmsted ==
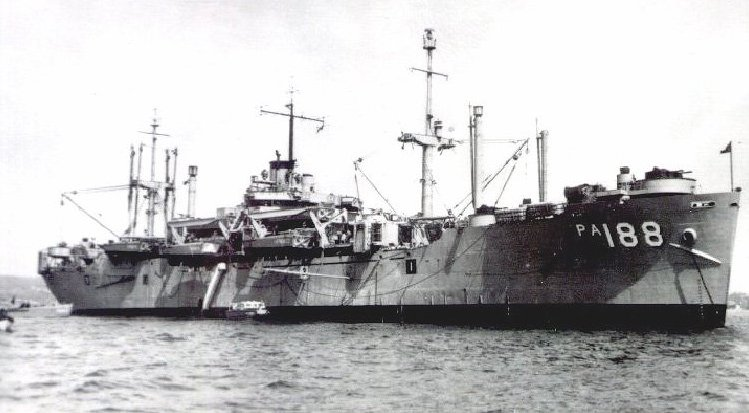
USS Olmsted

Olmsted was built by Kaiser Company. Her keel was laid on 11 April 1944. She was launched on 4 July and delivered on 5 September. Built for the United States Navy. Decommissioned in 1947 and laid up in reserve at Norfolk, Virginia. Recommissioned in 1952 due to the Korean War. To the USMC in 1960 and laid up in the James River. She was scrapped in Spain in 1986.

== Oneida ==
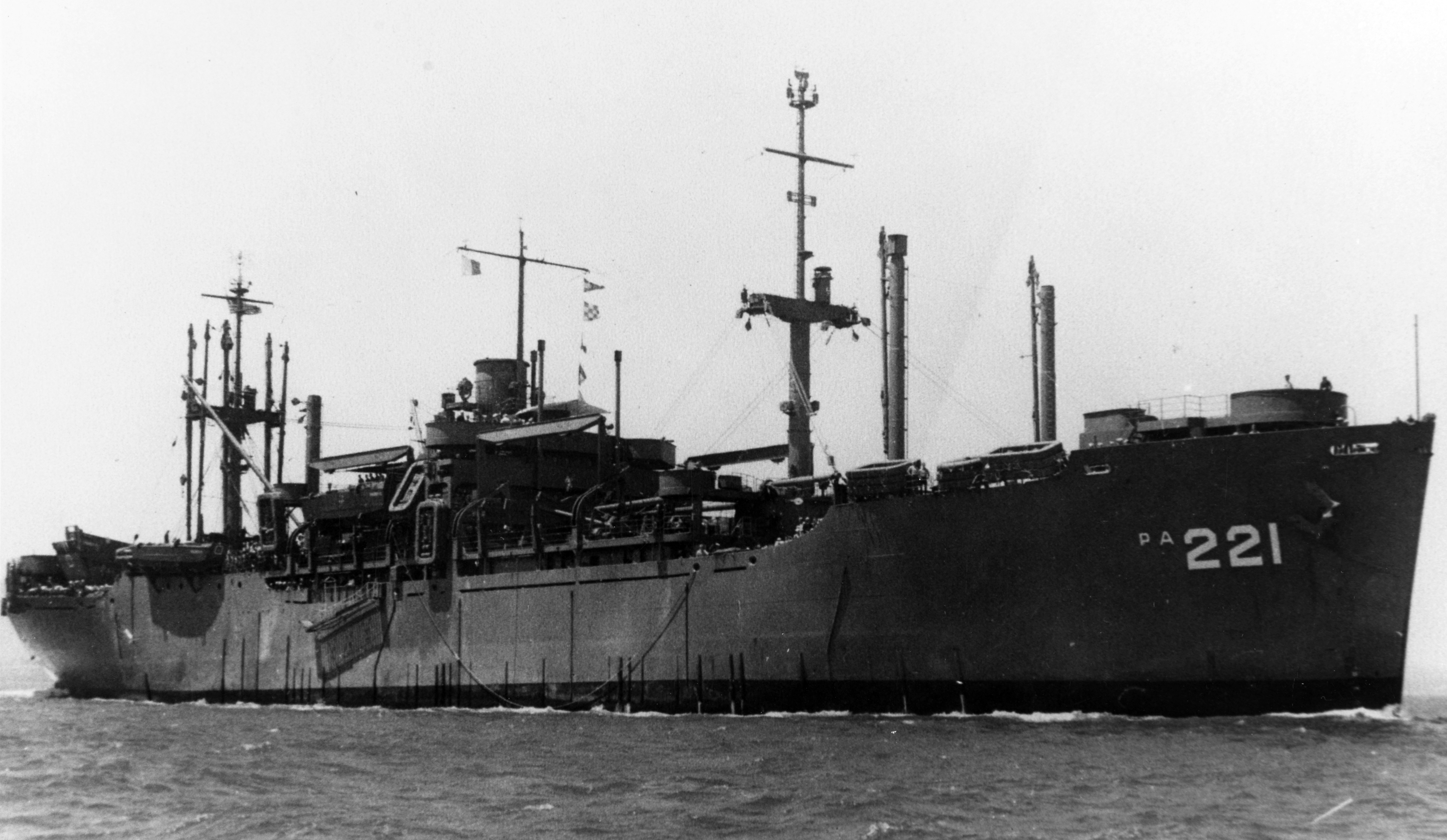
USS Oneida

Oneida was built by Permanente Metals Corporation. Her keel was laid on 30 September 1944. She was launched on 31 October and delivered on 4 December. Built for the United States Navy. Decommissioned in 1946 and laid up at Long Beach, California. To the United States Maritime Administration in 1958. Laid up in Suisun Bay. She was scrapped in the United States in 1975.

== Oneida Victory ==
Oneida Victory was built by Bethlehem Fairfield Shipyard. Her keel was laid on 16 September 1944. She was launched on 4 November and delivered on 30 November. Built for the WSA, she was operated under the management of United Fruit Company. She collided with the T2 tanker W. L. R. Emmet off Santa Barbara, California on 31 March 1946 and was severely damaged. She was towed in to Los Angeles for temporary repairs. She was towed to San Francisco on 16 May and laid up. She was scrapped at Terminal Island in March 1949.

== Oshkosh Victory ==
Oskhosh Victory was built by California Shipbuilding Corporation. Her keel was laid on 6 June 1945. She was launched on 9 August and delivered on 10 September. Built for the WSA, she was operated under the management of Mississippi Shipping Company. Laid up in Suisun Bay in 1948. Later transferred to the James River. She was scrapped at Alang, India in 1992.

== Ouachita Victory ==
Ouachita Victory was built by California Shipbuilding Corporation. Her keel was laid on 14 March 1945. She was launched on 8 May and delivered on 31 May. Built for the WSA, she was operated under the management of Mississippi Shipping Company. Sold in 1949 to Central Gulf Steamship Corp., Wilmington, Delaware and renamed Green Valley. Lengthened in March 1962 by Deutsche Werft, Hamburg, West Germany. Now 545 feet 3 inches (166.19 m) long, 9,482 GRT, 13,245 DWT. She was scrapped at Kaohsiung in December 1970.

== Owensboro Victory ==
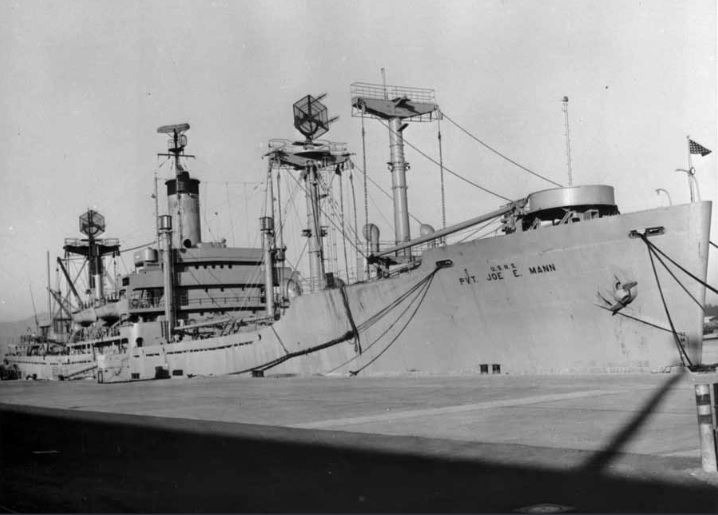
USNS Pvt. Joe E. Mann

Owensboro Victory was built by Permanente Metals Corporation. Her keel was laid on 12 June 1945. She was launched on 21 July and delivered on 27 August. Built for the WSA, she was operated under the management of Coastwise Line. To the United States Army Transportation Corps in 1947 and renamed Pvt. Joe E. Mann. To the USMC in 1950, laid up at Beaumont. To the United States Navy later that year. Operated by the Military Sea Transportation Service. Renamed Richfield in 1960. Laid up in Suisun Bay in 1968. She was sold for scrapping in 1976.

== Oxford ==
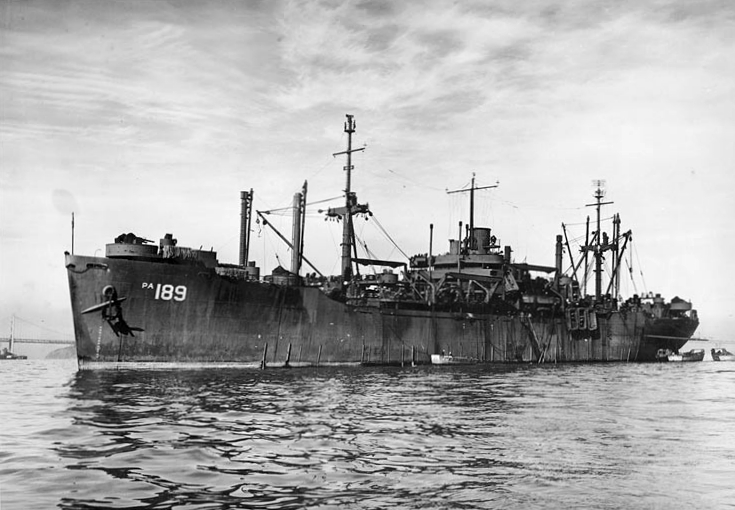
USS Oxford

Oxford was built by Kaiser Company. Her keel was laid on 17 April 1944. She was launched on 12 July and delivered on 11 September. Built for the United States Navy. Laid up in the James River in 1946. She was scrapped in 1974.
