= Gray Gables (disambiguation) =

Gray Gables may refer to:

- Gray Gables, the summer residence of Grover Cleveland in Bourne, Massachusetts
- Gray Gables (Darlington, Maryland), listed on the National Register of Historic Places in Maryland
- Gray Gables (Winton, North Carolina), listed on the NRHP in Hertford County, North Carolina
- Gray Gables (Tampa), a neighborhood within the City of Tampa, Florida
- Gray Gables Railroad Station, a former railroad station in Bourne, Massachusetts

== See also ==
- Grey Gables
