= Oneida =

Oneida may refer to:

== Indigenous people ==
- Oneida people, Indigenous people of the Northeastern Woodlands and one of the five founding nations of the Haudenosaunee Confederacy
- Oneida language, Iroquoian language
- Oneida Indian Nation, federally recognized tribe based in New York
- Oneida Nation, federally recognized tribe based in Wisconsin
- Oneida Nation of the Thames, or Onyota'a:ka First Nation, First Nation based in Ontario
- Oneida First Nation, First Nation based at Six Nations of the Grand River in Ontario

== People ==
- Mary Oneida Toups, American occultist
- Oneida Guaipe, Venezuelan politician

== Places ==
- Oneida County (disambiguation)
- Oneida Township (disambiguation)

=== Canada ===
- Oneida 41, Ontario, also known as the "Oneida Settlement"
- Oneida Township, Ontario, a historic township of Haldimand County

=== United States ===
- Oneida, former name of Martell, California
- Oneida, Illinois
- Oneida, Kansas
- Oneida, Kentucky
- Oneida, New York
- Oneida, Ohio
- Oneida, Pennsylvania
- Oneida Falls, one of 24 named waterfalls in Ricketts Glen State Park in Pennsylvania
- Oneida, Tennessee
- Oneida (town), Wisconsin in Outagamie County
- Oneida, Wisconsin, unincorporated community in both Outagamie and Brown Counties
- Oneida Castle, New York, a village
- Oneida Corners, New York, hamlet of the town of Queensbury in Warren County
- Oneida, a former name of Amarillo, Texas
- Oneida Creek, in central New York State
- Oneida Lake, in central New York State
- Oneida River, in central New York State
- Oneida County Airport, a closed airport in Whitestown, New York

== Sport ==
- Oneida Football Club, historical Boston football club (founded in 1862)
- Oneida FC, a Cambridge, Massachusetts rugby league club

== Other uses ==
- Oneida Carry, a portage for native and colonial Americans in Central New York
- Oneida Community, a religious intentional community in Oneida, New York
- Oneida Limited, the international tableware company
- Oneida (band), a five-piece rock band from Brooklyn, New York
- Oneida (moth), a genus of moths
- USS Oneida, any of five ships in the U.S. Navy
- Two civilian steam yachts owned by Elias Cornelius Benedict, each associated with unique historical incidents:
  - USS Adelante (SP-765), originally launched in 1883 as the Utowana, acquired and renamed Oneida by Benedict in 1887 and later renamed again as the Adelante before being acquired by the U.S. Navy in 1918; notable as the site of a secret operation in July 1893 on President Grover Cleveland for the removal of a cancerous growth from his mouth.
  - Oneida (1897), originally launched in 1897 as the Alcedo before being renamed and acquired by Benedict as a larger replacement for the previous ship of that name owned by him, considered for acquisition by the U.S. Navy during World War I but never taken, and later acquired by William Randolph Hearst (with whom it became involved with the mysterious death of film producer Thomas H. Ince).
- Whitestown Seminary, a Presbyterian educational institution based in Whitestown, New York, and founded in 1827, previously known as Oneida Academy and Oneida Institute
