= Elisha Jay Edwards =

American journalist

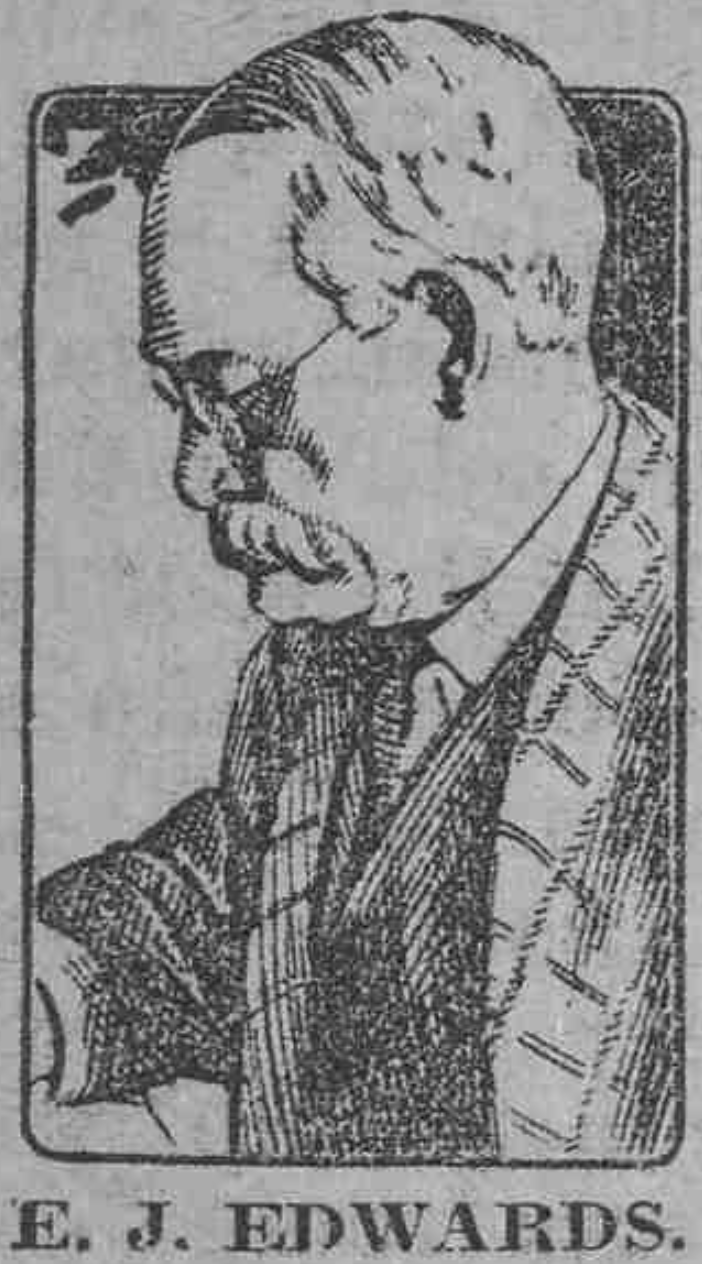
Image accompanying the "New News of Yesterday" column, 1911

Elisha Jay Edwards (often bylined as E.J. Edwards, and under the pen name Holland) (1847 – April 25, 1924) was a well-known investigative journalist and financial reporter of the late 19th and early 20th century. He broke the story in 1893 of President Grover Cleveland's secret cancer surgery aboard his friend Elias Cornelius Benedict's yacht Oneida, which the administration denied.

Edwards graduated from Yale University in 1870, and its law school in 1873. He served as Washington correspondent of the New York Sun from 1880 to 1884, and editor of the New York Evening Sun from 1887 to 1889. Starting in 1889 he began writing a long-running column as "Holland" which was carried in The Philadelphia Press, Chicago Inter Ocean, and The Cincinnati Enquirer.

Edwards also had a personal and professional relationship with author Stephen Crane.

Edwards also wrote a book titled, Shad and Shed, Or, The Remarkable Adventures of the Puritan Brothers.

Edwards died in Greenwich, Connecticut, at age 76 on April 25, 1924, after a brief illness, survived by his wife and three sons (Walter S., Charles H., and E. Jay Jr.).
