= Onida =

Onida may refer to:

- Onida, South Dakota
- Onida Electronics

== See also ==
- Oneida (disambiguation)
