= USS Oneida =

USS Oneida has been the name of more than one United States Navy ship, and may refer to:

- USS Oneida (1809), a brig commissioned in 1810, sold in 1815, repurchased, and sold again in 1825
- USS Oneida (1861), a screw sloop of war in commission from 1862 to 1865 and from 1867 until wrecked in 1870
- USS Oneida (1898), a patrol vessel in commission from April to September 1898 and during September 1912 and in commission as USS Henry P. Williams (SP-509) and USS SP-509 in 1918–1919
- USS Oneida (SP-432), the proposed name and designation of a yacht considered for use as a patrol vessel during World War I but never acquired by the Navy
- USS Oneida (SP-765), a patrol vessel in commission from 1918 to 1919
- USS Oneida (APA-221), an attack transport in commission from 1944 to 1946
