= Oneida County =

Oneida County is the name of three counties in the United States:

- Oneida County, Idaho
- Oneida County, New York
- Oneida County, Wisconsin

== See also ==
- Oneida (disambiguation)
