= Aptucxet Trading Post Museum =

American historical museum in Massachusetts

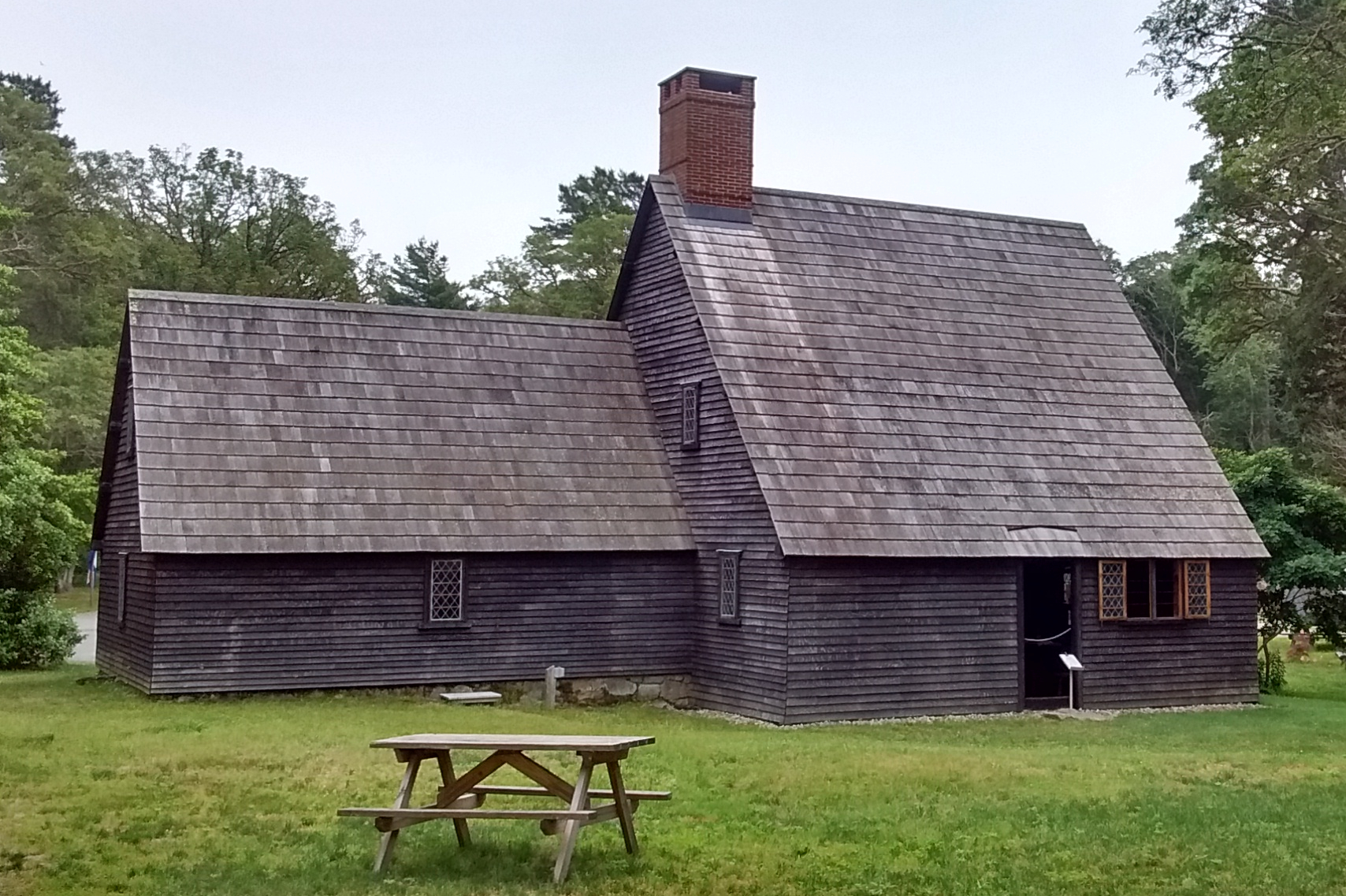
- Replica of the Aptucxet Trading Post

- Location on Cape Cod Aptucxet Trading Post Museum (the United States)
- Established: 1930
- Location: Bourne, Massachusetts
- Coordinates: 41.742°N 70.605°W
- Type: Historic site
- Owner: Bourne Historical Society
- Website: www.bournehistoricalsociety.org/aptucxet-museum/

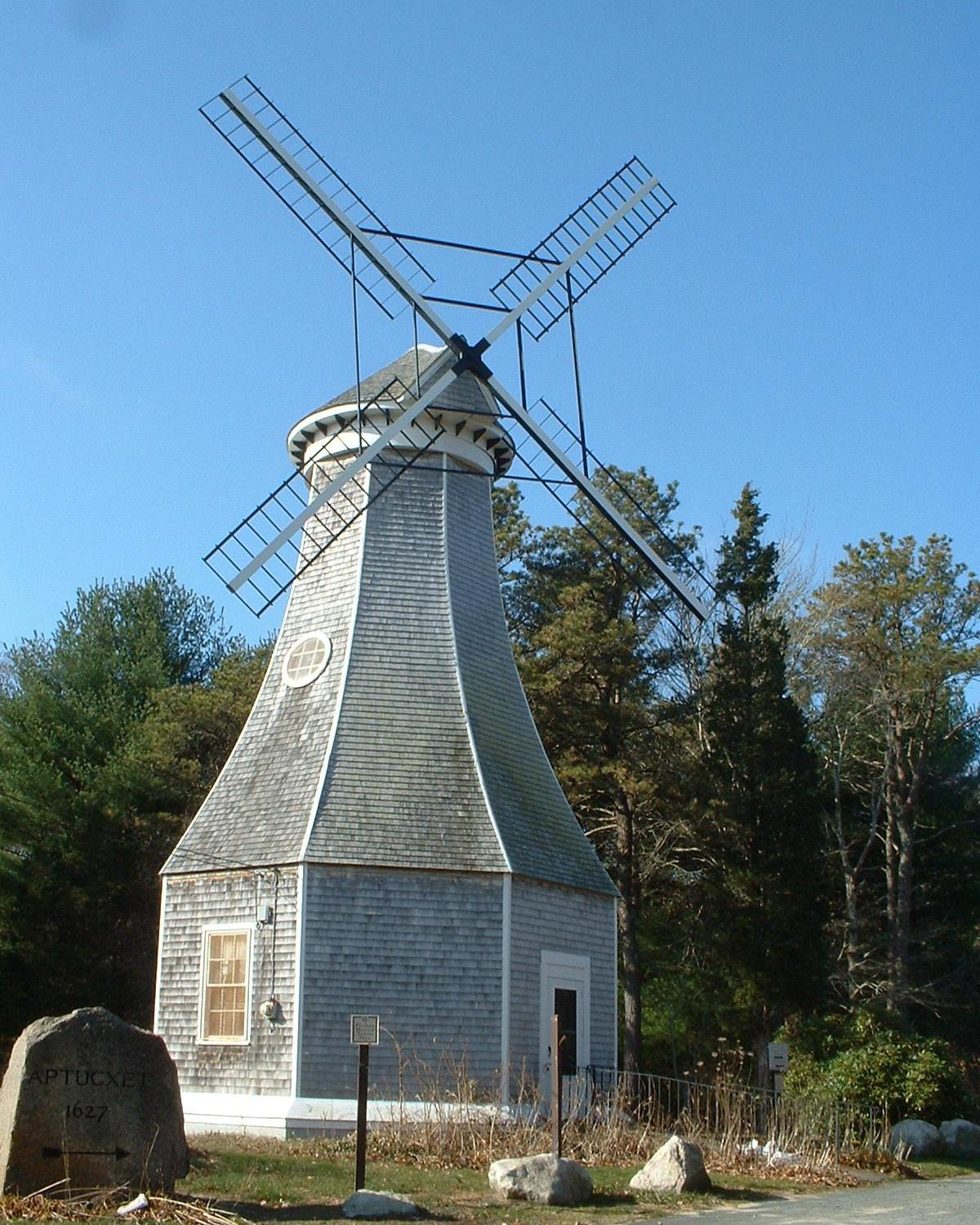
1971 windmill at the Aptucxet Trading Post Museum

The Aptucxet Trading Post Museum is a small open-air historical museum in Bourne, Massachusetts. The main attraction is a replica of the 17th-century Aptucxet Trading Post which was built by the Pilgrims of Plymouth Colony in order to trade with the Wampanoag Indians and the Dutch. The museum also features a replica of a 19th-century saltworks, the relocated 19th-century Gray Gables Railroad Station, and a wooden smock windmill. The property was listed on the National Register of Historic Places in 2021.

== Aptucxet Trading Post ==
In 1627, English colonists from Plymouth Colony established a trading post 20 miles (32 km) south of Plymouth at Aptucxet on the Manamet River (also known as the Manomet or Monument River) on upper Cape Cod. The post was the colonists' first permanent settlement on Cape Cod, although they had previously visited the Manamet River area to trade for corn and beans and to search for a missing colonist. The name Aptucxet is a Wampanoag word meaning "little trap in the river", possibly referring to a fishing weir.

The post was established primarily to trade with the Wampanoags, which was desirable for the colonists for several reasons. The colony relied in part on corn and beans supplied by the Indians, and some colonists hoped to start a fur trade in order to repay their debts to England. The trading post also came to be used for trade between the English colonists and the Dutch colonists of New Amsterdam to the south, today New York City.

Aptucxet was the first trading post established by the Plymouth colonists, and it was followed in 1633 by the Metteneque Trading Post in Windsor Locks, Connecticut and the Cushnoc Trading Post in Augusta, Maine. Aptucxet was located some distance from the colony and was staffed year-round by colonists. The Great Colonial Hurricane of 1635 damaged one of the buildings, and the post was abandoned by the 1650s. The land later became part of a farm.

The first archaeological dig on the property was conducted in 1852 when John Batchelder and William Russell undertook a partial excavation of a double cellar hole foundation. They believed that the foundation was part of the original Aptucxet Trading Post, although some researchers have suggested that it may have belonged to a later building. The Bourne Historical Society acquired the land in 1922, and a thorough excavation was conducted between 1926 and 1929 by Percival Hall Lombard and Nathan Bourne Hartford. The current replica building was constructed in 1930 upon these original foundations, using findings from the archaeological digs.

The Manamet and Scusset Rivers were widened early in the 20th century and connected to form the Cape Cod Canal, following a route very similar to the one used by Plymouth colonists to travel to the Aptucxet Trading Post. Consequently, the Aptucxet Trading Post Museum is now located on the banks of the Cape Cod Canal rather than the Manamet River.

== Saltworks ==
The museum also features a replica saltworks similar to ones that were used in the area to manufacture sea salt in the 1800s. The saltworks consist of square wooden vats where seawater was left to evaporate. Each vat is equipped with a sliding hipped roof that can be used to protect it from dew and rain. The replica was built in 1967 and rebuilt in 2000 and 2014.

== Gray Gables Railroad Station ==
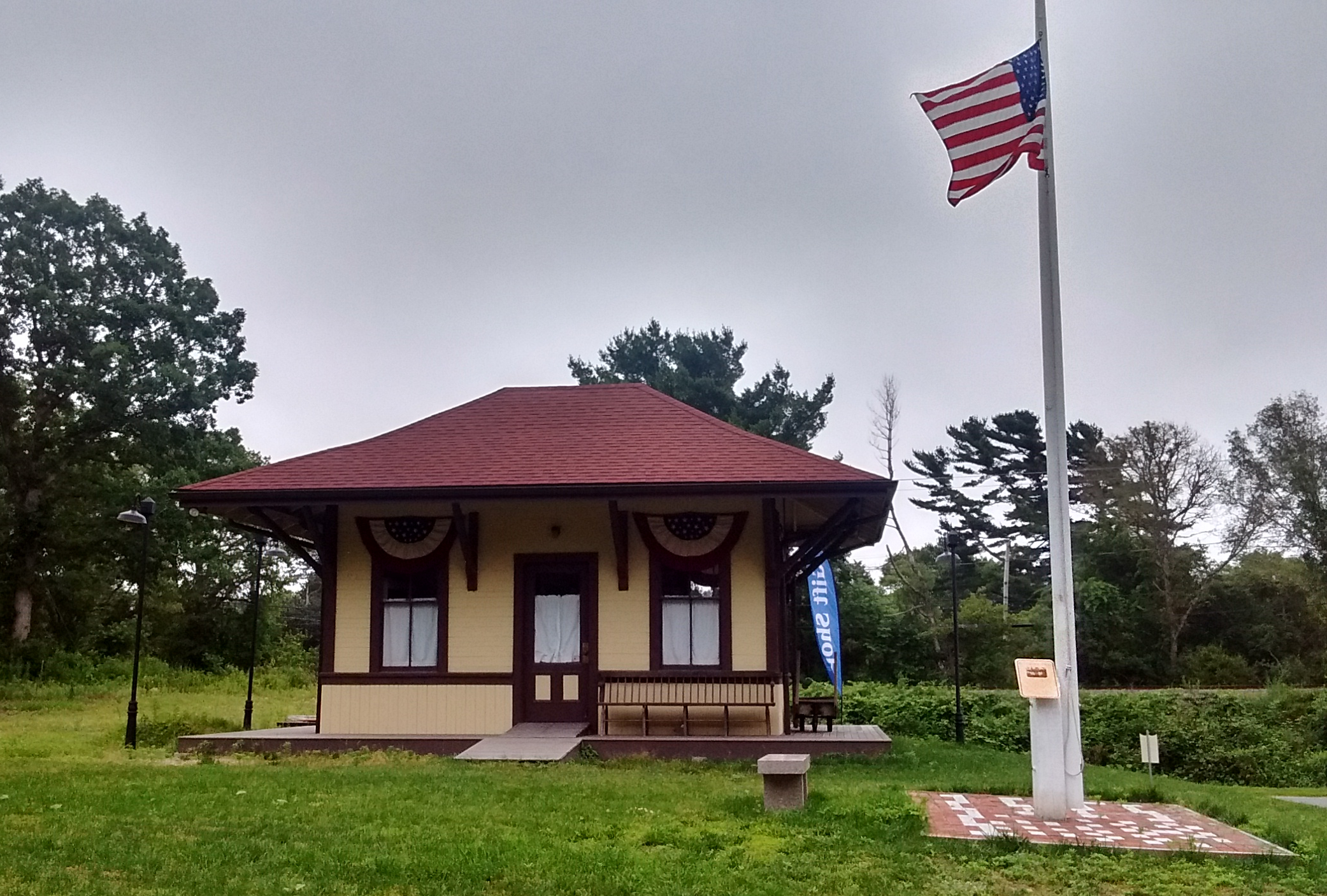
Gray Gables Railroad Station building at the Aptucxet Trading Post Museum

The museum houses the original station building of the nearby defunct Gray Gables Railroad Station. It was built in 1892 near President Grover Cleveland's summer home of Gray Gables and included a direct telegraph line to Washington, D.C. The station closed in the 1940s and was purchased by the Bourne Historical Society in 1976. It was relocated to the Aptucxet Trading Post Museum in 1977 and renovated in 2014.

== See also ==
- List of museums in Massachusetts
- List of windmills in Massachusetts
- National Register of Historic Places listings in Barnstable County, Massachusetts
