= Grey Gables =

Grey Gables may refer to:

- Grey Gables, Ojai the Californian retirement home of American Association of Retired Persons founder Dr. Ethel Percy Andrus
- Grey Gables, Ambridge, fictional establishment in "The Archers"

== See also ==
- Gray Gables
