= Cleveland East Ledge Light =

Lighthouse in Massachusetts, United States

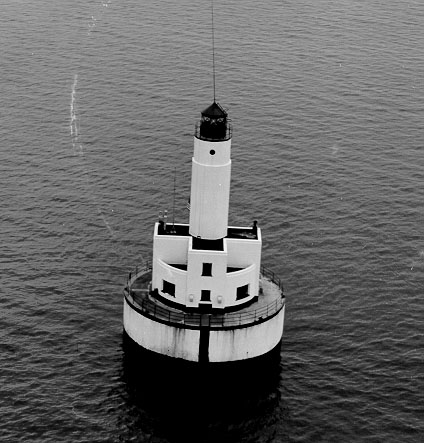
- Location: Falmouth, Massachusetts
- Coordinates: 41°37′51.47″N 70°41′39.046″W

Tower
- Constructed: 1943
- Foundation: Concrete and rock caisson
- Construction: Reinforced concrete
- Automated: 1978
- Height: 21 m (69 ft)
- Shape: Cylindrical on square dwelling
- Markings: White tower red-brown caisson black lantern
- Heritage: National Register of Historic Places listed place
- Fog signal: Horn, one every 15s
- Racon: "C" (Charlie)

Light
- Focal height: 74 feet (23 m)
- Lens: 4th order Fresnel lens (original), 7.5 inches (190 mm) (current)
- Range: 15 nautical miles (28 km; 17 mi)
- Characteristic: Fl W 10s
- Cleveland Ledge Light Station
- U.S. National Register of Historic Places
- Nearest city: Falmouth, Massachusetts
- Area: less than one acre
- Architectural style: Moderne, Art Moderne
- MPS: Lighthouses of Massachusetts TR
- NRHP reference No.: 87001462
- Added to NRHP: June 15, 1987

Cleveland East Ledge Light is a historic lighthouse in Falmouth, Massachusetts. It sits on a man-made island in shallow water on the eastern of the two halves of Cleveland Ledge, which is said to have been named for President Grover Cleveland because he owned the nearby Gray Gables estate and used to fish in the area. It marks the east side of the beginning of the dredged channel leading to the Cape Cod Canal and is the first fixed mark when going northbound through the canal. As it is an important mark in an area subject to fog, it has a racon showing the letter "C".

== Structure ==
The lighthouse is built atop a caisson 52 feet in diameter, which also contains the lighthouse's engine room. The first two floors of the lighthouse serve as living and working space, on top of which sits the cylindrical concrete tower which is another 50 feet tall.

== History ==
The lighthouse was built between 1940 and 1943 after a re-dredging of the Cape Cod Canal in the late 1930s, which allowed larger ships to pass through and necessitated the marking of Cleveland East Ledge, which sits quite close to the path of ships approaching the south entrance to the canal. The state of Massachusetts began the project, but in 1941 turned it over to the Coast Guard, which, after delays caused by the war, completed it in 1943.

In 1978, the laying of an underwater cable to the lighthouse allowed its automation, obviating the need for the 4-person Coast Guard crew which had staffed the light since its 1943 inauguration. The lighthouse was sealed and would remain unoccupied for much of the next 3 decades, apart from a 3-week renovation by the Coast Guard in 1990. It was added to the National Register of Historic Places as Cleveland Ledge Light Station in 1987.

Without regular maintenance, the lighthouse fell into disrepair. After putting the lighthouse on the market in 2007 generated very little interest, the General Services Administration put the lighthouse up for auction in October 2010. The bidding lasted into December. The winning party purchased the lighthouse for $190,000. It is now owned by the Cleveland Ledge Lighthouse, LLC.

== See also ==
- National Register of Historic Places listings in Barnstable County, Massachusetts
