= Gray Gables (Tampa) =

- Neighborhood
- Location within the state of Florida
- Coordinates: 27.9416°N 82.4983°W
- Country: United States
- State: Florida
- County: Hillsborough
- City: Tampa
- Gray Gables and Bon Air combined: 921
- Time zone: UTC-5 (Eastern (EST))
  - Summer (DST): UTC-4 (EDT)
- ZIP Code: 33609

Gray Gables is a neighborhood and platted subdivision within the city limits of Tampa, Florida, United States. It is located in the South Tampa area, west of Tampa's urban core and east of Dale Mabry Highway. The City of Tampa identifies the neighborhood as lying roughly between West Kennedy Boulevard to the north, South Himes Avenue to the west, West Azeele Street to the south, and Henderson Boulevard to the east. The ZIP Code serving the neighborhood is 33609.

Gray Gables is adjacent to Bon Air. As of the 2000 census, Gray Gables and Bon Air had a combined population of 921.

== History and development ==
The Gray Gables subdivision was originally platted in 1925. In a 2020 Tampa City Council rezoning hearing, city planning staff described the subdivision plat as containing five blocks, with original lots ranging from 50 to 148 feet in width and from 61 to 150 feet in depth. The same hearing record described the plat as part of the area's established development pattern, with a mixture of lot sizes and shapes.

Although the City of Tampa's modern neighborhood page gives Henderson Boulevard as the rough eastern boundary, the historic platted subdivision has also been described in city zoning records as bounded by Kennedy Boulevard to the north, Azeele Street to the south, Himes Avenue to the west, and Beverly Avenue to the east.

== Geography ==
Gray Gables is located south of West Kennedy Boulevard and north of West Azeele Street, east of South Himes Avenue and west of Henderson Boulevard. The neighborhood is near several other South Tampa neighborhoods, including Bon Air, Palma Ceia West, Oakford Park, and Golfview.

The neighborhood is primarily residential. City zoning records have described portions of the area around Azeele Street as having a mixture of residential and office uses, particularly closer to Dale Mabry Highway.

== Government and civic life ==
Gray Gables is listed by the City of Tampa among the neighborhood associations in Tampa City Council District 6. City planning and zoning records have also referred to the Gray Gables and Bon Air area together in neighborhood-association contexts.

== Infrastructure ==
The City of Tampa has listed a Gray Gables water-main improvement project, identified as project WTR-22-0005. The project is intended to replace and upgrade approximately 12,722 linear feet of water mains, ranging from 2 to 12 inches in diameter, in order to improve water pressure, water quality, and system capacity. As of the city's project listing, the project was in the design phase, with construction listed for fiscal year 2026 and an estimated cost of $4,743,601.

== See also ==
- Neighborhoods in Tampa, Florida
- South Tampa
