= Oneida Township =

Oneida Township may refer to:

== Canada ==
- Oneida Township, Ontario

== United States ==
=== Iowa ===
- Oneida Township, Delaware County, Iowa
- Oneida Township, Tama County, Iowa

=== Michigan ===
- Oneida Charter Township, Michigan

=== Nebraska ===
- Oneida Township, Kearney County, Nebraska

=== Pennsylvania ===
- Oneida Township, Pennsylvania

=== South Dakota ===
- Oneida Township, Sanborn County, South Dakota, in Sanborn County, South Dakota
