= USS Okaloosa =

1944 Haskell-class attack transport

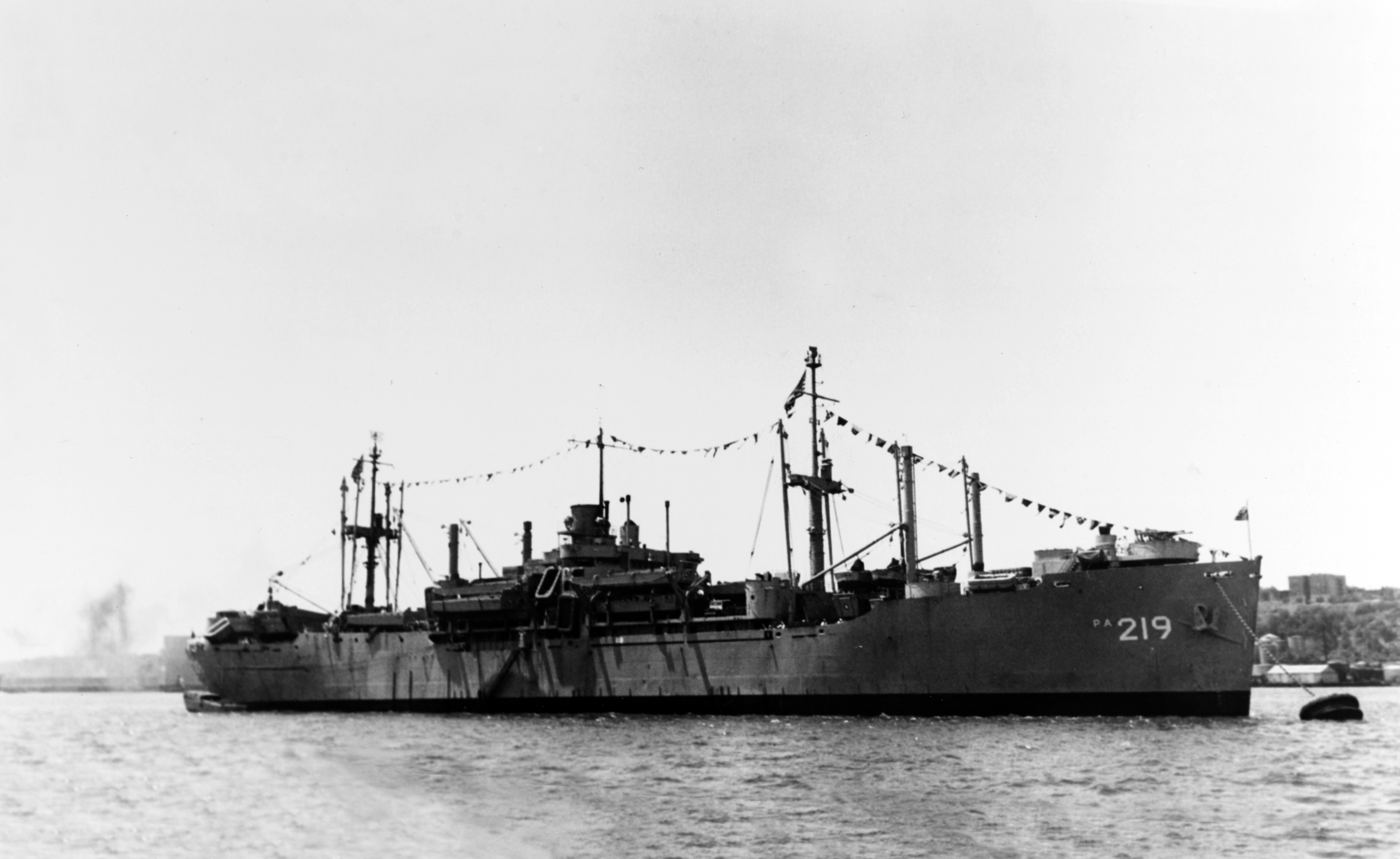

History

United States
- Name: Okaloosa
- Namesake: Okaloosa County, Florida
- Ordered: as a Type VC2-S-AP5 hull, MCE hull 567
- Builder: Permanente Metals Corporation, Richmond, California
- Yard number: 567
- Laid down: 8 August 1944
- Launched: 22 October 1944
- Commissioned: 28 November 1944
- Decommissioned: 21 July 1949
- Stricken: 1 October 1958
- Identification: Hull symbol: APA-219; Code letters: NPQT
- Honors and awards: 1 × battle star for World War II service
- Fate: Sold for scrapping, 28 October 1971, delivered, 30 May 1972

General characteristics
- Class & type: Haskell-class attack transport
- Type: Type VC2-S-AP5
- Displacement: 6,873 long tons (6,983 t) (light load); 14,837 long tons (15,075 t) (full load)
- Length: 455 ft (139 m)
- Beam: 62 ft (19 m)
- Draft: 24 ft (7.3 m)
- Installed power: 2 × Combustion Engineering header-type boilers, 465 psi (3,210 kPa) 750 °F (399 °C); 8,500 shp (6,338 kW)
- Propulsion: 1 × Westinghouse geared turbine; 1 x propeller
- Speed: 17.7 kn (32.8 km/h; 20.4 mph)
- Boats & landing craft carried: 2 × LCMs; 1 × open LCPL; 18 × LCVPs; 2 × LCPRs; 1 × closed LCPL (Captain's Gig)
- Capacity: 2,900 long tons (2,900 t) DWT; 150,000 cu ft (4,200 m^{3}) (non-refrigerated)
- Troops: 87 officers, 1,475 enlisted
- Complement: 56 officers, 480 enlisted
- Armament: 1 × 5 in (127 mm)/38 caliber dual purpose gun; 1 × quad 40 mm (1.6 in) Bofors anti-aircraft (AA) gun mounts; 4 × twin 40mm Bofors (AA) gun mounts; 10 × single 20 mm (0.8 in) Oerlikon cannons AA mounts

Service record
- Part of: TransRon 19
- Operations: Assault and occupation of Okinawa Gunto (26–30 April 1945)
- Awards: China Service Medal; American Campaign Medal; Asiatic–Pacific Campaign Medal; World War II Victory Medal; Navy Occupation Service Medal

USS Okaloosa (APA-219) was a Haskell-class attack transport in service with the United States Navy from 1944 to 1949. She was scrapped in 1972.

== Construction ==
Okaloosa was of the VC2-S-AP5 Victory ship design type and was named after Okaloosa County, Florida. She was laid down 8 August 1944, under a Maritime Commission (MARCOM) contract, MCV Hull 567, by Permanente Metals Corporation, Yard No. 2, Richmond, California; launched 22 October 1944; acquired by the Navy on a loan charter basis 28 November 1944; and commissioned the same day.

== Service history ==
=== World War II ===
Following commissioning and fitting out, Okaloosa departed Seattle with troops 26 January 1945, for Honolulu, then operated out of Pearl Harbor until sailing 29 March, with US Army units for Eniwetok, Ulithi, and Okinawa. She arrived off Okinawa 26 April, and offloaded troops without incident during the next four days, despite frequent enemy air attacks. The transport then returned to the West Coast, arriving San Francisco 22 May. Her stay was short, however, and she embarked troops and cargo immediately, leaving 30 May, for Manila and Leyte, Philippines. Except for a brief voyage to New Guinea in early July, Okaloosa shuttled troops and cargo among the Philippine Islands until departing Manila Bay 7 September, for Tokyo Bay with occupation units.

=== Post-war service ===
From Tokyo Bay, Okaloosa sailed, in turn, to Guam; Qingdao, China; Manila; and Haiphong, French Indo-China; where she loaded elements of the Chinese 52nd Army bound for the Gulf of Bohai, China.

==== Operation Magic Carpet ====
Assigned to Operation Magic Carpet on 16 November, Okaloosa sailed to Jinsen, Korea, took on her full capacity of returning troops, and sailed 30 November, for Tacoma, Washington, arriving 17 December. Four days later, she entered Puget Sound Navy Yard for overhaul. She sailed 11 January 1946, via the Panama Canal for Norfolk, Virginia, arriving on the last day of the month. Also, on 14 January, she came under full ownership of the Navy.

==== Peacetime cruises ====
For the next few years, Okaloosa operated out of Norfolk, many times with Marines from nearby bases. Three times, in June and July 1947, and June 1948, she conducted cruises for large numbers of east coast reservists, sailing to Bermuda on the last two. In addition, amphibious exercises took her to Puerto Rico and other Caribbean islands on a number of month-long cruises and several shorter ones.

==== Decommissioning and fate ====
On 15 April 1949, Okaloosa sailed from Norfolk for Orange, Texas, and deactivation. After overhaul, she decommissioned on 21 July, and entered the Texas Group, Atlantic Reserve Fleet. She was returned to the Maritime Administration (MARAD) 23 September 1955, with permanent custody transferred 26 September 1958. She was struck from the Navy Register 1 October 1958. On 28 October 1971, Okaloosa was sold to Union Minerals & Alloys Corporation, along with eight other ships, for $467,100, with the condition that they would be scrapped. At the time she was part of the National Defense Reserve Fleet, Mobile, Alabama, Group. On 30 May 1972, she was officially withdrawn from the Reserve Fleet.

==== Ship's bell ====
When the vessel was dismantled, its relics were salvaged and Baldwin County, Alabama requested the ship's bell for a war memorial at its satellite courthouse in Foley. Okaloosa County Judge T. Patterson Maney, a retired U.S. Army brigadier general, discovered the bell during a visit to Foley and worked to bring it back to its namesake county. On 4 January 2012, county officials of Okaloosa County, Florida, retrieved the bell from Foley for display in front of the Destin–Fort Walton Beach Airport. In exchange, the U.S. Navy presented Baldwin County with the bell from Peterson for its memorial. Okaloosa County held a dedication on 26 April 2012.

"The Baldwin County Commission has been extremely gracious," said Tracy Stage, projects manager for the airport, of the transfer of the bell. "We're bringing it back to Okaloosa County where it belongs. I can't think of a better way to recognize the Navy, the Marine Corps and all the veterans."

== Awards ==
Okaloosa received one battle star for World War II service.

== Bibliography ==
Online resources

- "Okaloosa". Dictionary of American Naval Fighting Ships. Naval History and Heritage Command. 17 August 2015. This article incorporates text from this source, which is in the public domain.
- "Kaiser Permanente No. 2, Richmond CA". www.ShipbuildingHistory.com. 13 October 2010.
- "USS Okaloosa (APA-219)". NavSource. 1 May 2015.
- "OKALOOSA (APA-219)". United States Department of Transportation. Archived from the original on 2 November 2016.
- Barlow, Kari C. (22 December 2011). "Bell from USS Okaloosa to come to airport". Vol. 65, no. 326. Fort Walton Beach, Florida: Northwest Florida Daily News. pp. 1–2.
- McLaughlin, Tom (13 January 2012). "Warship's bell headed to Okaloosa County". Vol. 2, no. 3. Fort Walton Beach, Florida: The Red 7. p. 1.
