= Gray Gables station =

Gray Gables
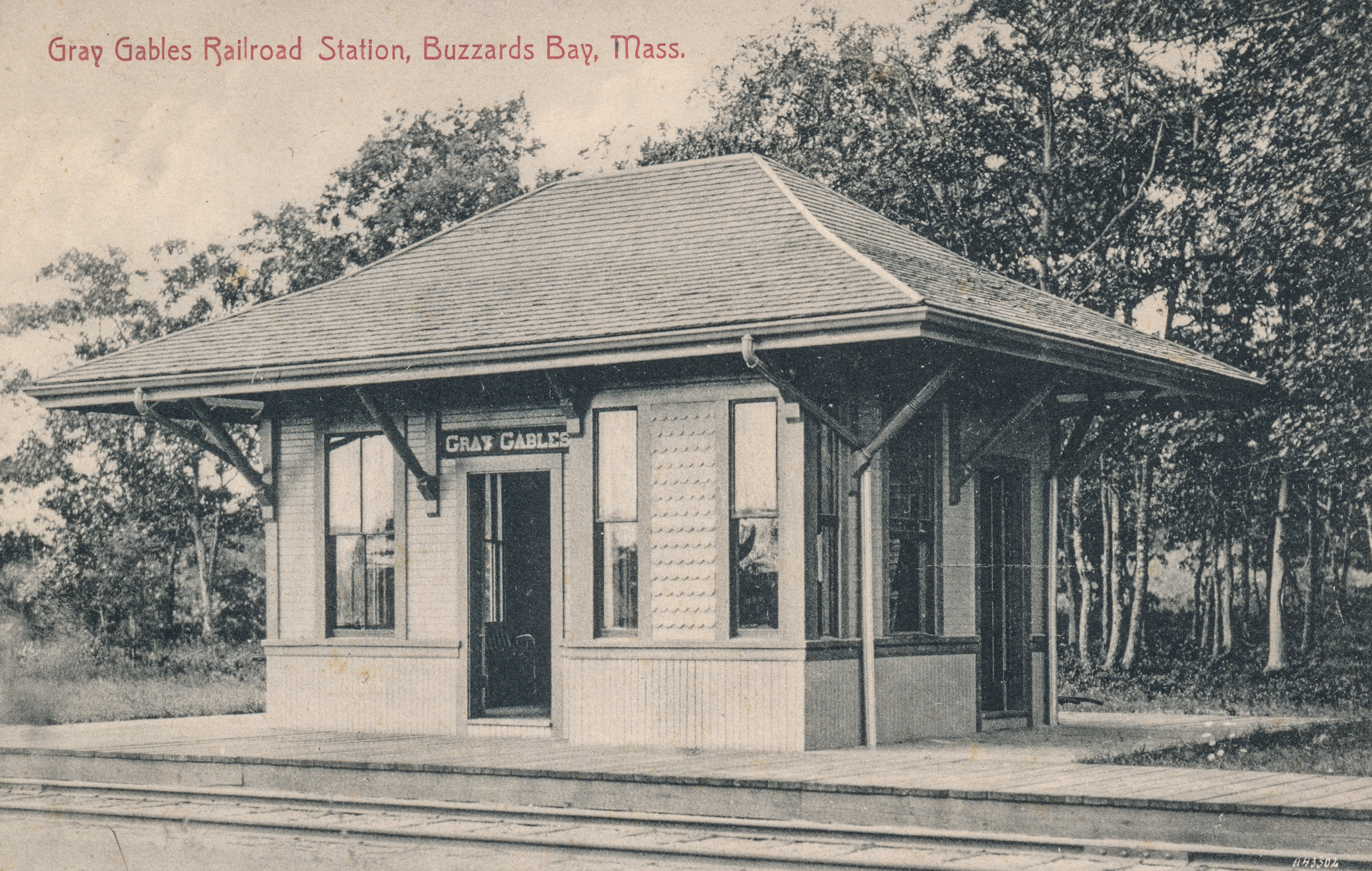
- Early-20-century postcard of Gray Gables station

General information
- Location: Monument Neck Road, Bourne, Massachusetts
- Coordinates: 41°44′1.64″N 70°36′52.85″W
- Line: Woods Hole Branch

History
- Opened: 1892
- Closed: July 18, 1938

Former services
Preceding station	New York, New Haven and Hartford Railroad	Following station
Buzzards Bay toward Boston	Boston–Woods Hole	Monument Beach toward Woods Hole
Location

Gray Gables station is a former train station in Bourne, Massachusetts.

== History ==
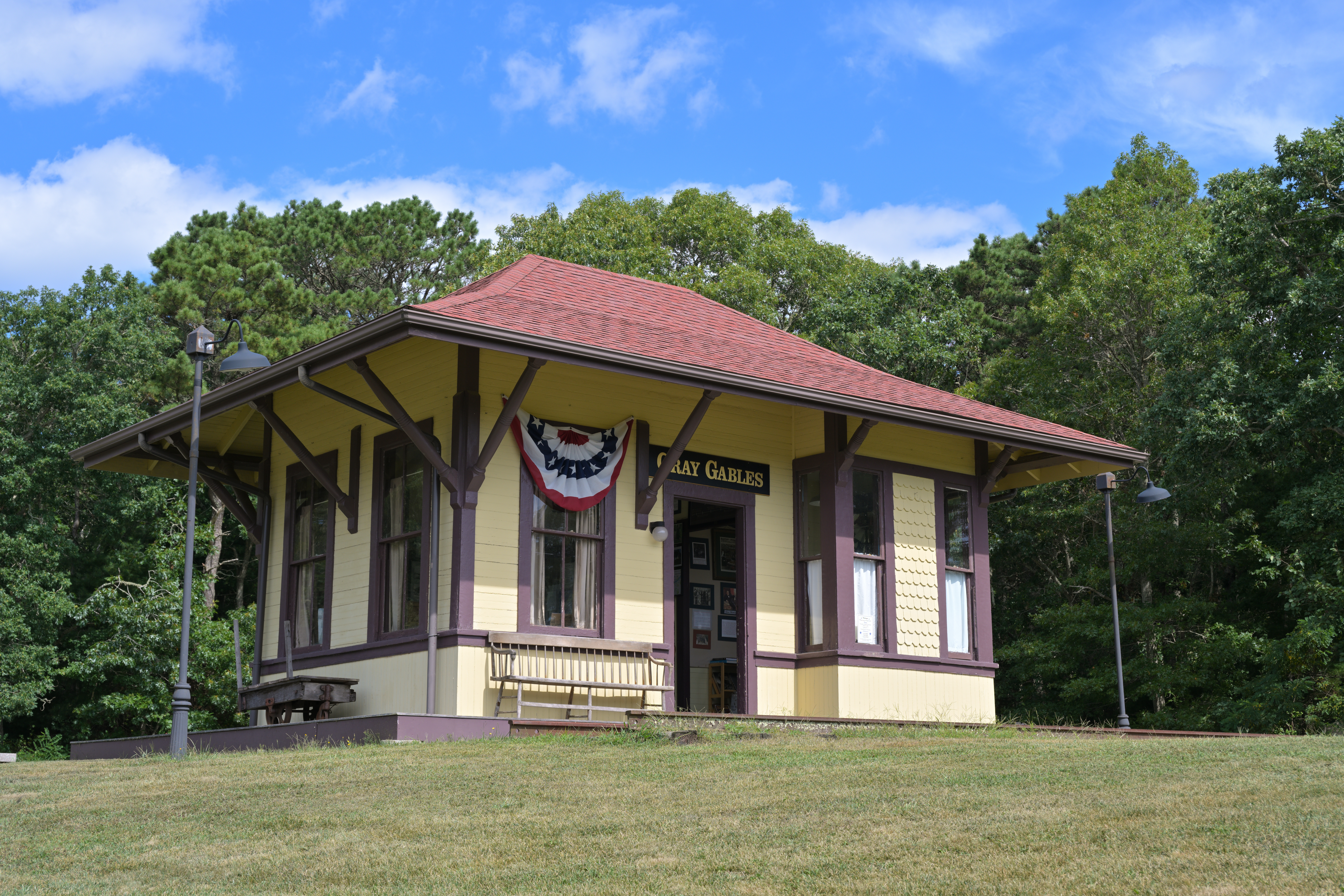
The former station building at the Aptucxet Trading Post Museum

The station was built by the Old Colony Railroad around 1892 as a stop for President Grover Cleveland's nearby summer home of Gray Gables. It was located on the Monument Neck Road in Bourne. The station was moved to the site of the Aptucxet Trading Post Museum in Bourne in 1977. In 2013, it was renovated and moved closer to Aptuxet Road.
