= Indian Field, Connecticut =

Census-designated place in Connecticut, United States

- Census-designated place
- Location within Connecticut Location within the United States
- Coordinates: 41°1′5″N 73°36′25″W
- Country: United States
- State: Connecticut
- County: Fairfield
- Town: Greenwich

Area
  - Total: 1.98 sq mi (5.12 km^{2})
  - Land: 0.90 sq mi (2.32 km^{2})
  - Water: 1.08 sq mi (2.80 km^{2})
- Elevation: 22 ft (6.7 m)
- Time zone: UTC-5 (Eastern (EST))
  - Summer (DST): UTC-4 (EDT)
- ZIP Code: 06830 (Greenwich)
- Area codes: 203/475
- FIPS code: 09-39695
- GNIS feature ID: 2805944

Indian Field is a census-designated place (CDP) in the town of Greenwich, Fairfield County, Connecticut, United States. It is in the southern part of the town, on a peninsula between Indian Harbor to the west and Cos Cob Harbor to the east. It extends south into Captain Harbor, an inlet of Long Island Sound, and it extends north as far as U.S. Route 1 (East Putnam Avenue). Interstate 95 crosses the CDP, with access from Exit 4 (Indian Field Road). As of the 2020 census, Indian Field had a population of 705.

Indian Field was first listed as a CDP prior to the 2020 census.

== Education ==
As with other parts of the Town of Greenwich, Indian Field is in the Greenwich Public Schools school district. The district's comprehensive high school is Greenwich High School.
