= USS Oneida (SP-432) =

Patrol vessel of the United States Navy

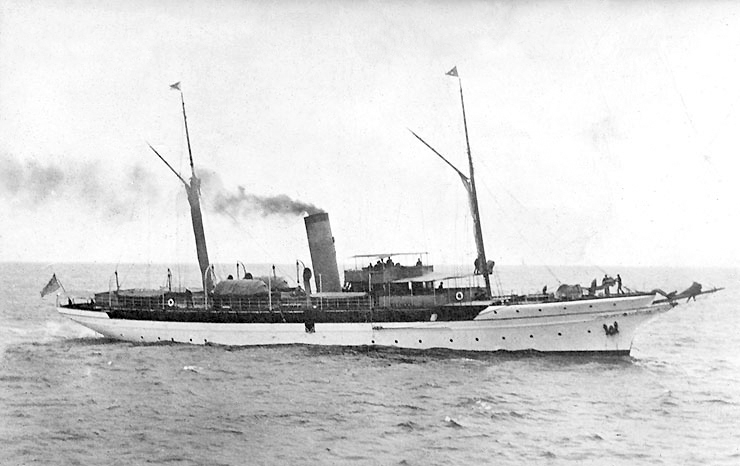
- The Oneida, in the July 1916 issue of the yachting journal The Rudder

History
- Name: Oneida
- Builder: Harlan and Hollingsworth Company, Wilmington, Delaware
- Completed: 1897
- Out of service: 1940
- Fate: Scrapped 1940

General characteristics
- Length: 200 ft (61 m)

USS Oneida (SP-432) was the proposed name and designation of an American steam yacht considered for use as a section patrol craft during World War I. In July 1917 the seagoing yacht was ordered taken by the U.S. Navy for service in international waters, but the yacht was never acquired and instead remained in private hands.

It was the second of two yachts named Oneida by owner Elias Cornelius Benedict, a prominent New York City banker and one of the world's leading yachtsmen. In 1922, after Benedict's death, the Oneida was purchased by publisher William Randolph Hearst. In November 1924 the yacht was associated with the mysterious death of American film producer Thomas H. Ince, a scandal that became part of early Hollywood lore.

The Oneida was sold by Hearst sometime after 1927. In 1932 the yacht was in use as a ferry vessel on Lake Champlain, based at Burlington, Vermont. In 1940, the rusty hull of the Oneida was purchased as scrap by Canada, for conversion into munitions for World War II.

== Design and construction ==
Designed by Albert S. Cheseborough, the Oneida was a 552 gross ton steam yacht built in 1897 by the Harlan and Hollingsworth Company of Wilmington, Delaware. The yacht measured 200 feet overall, with a breadth of 24 feet and a draught of 11.5 feet.

== Ownership ==
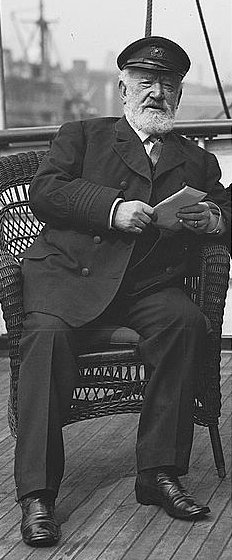
Commodore E. C. Benedict (1834–1920) aboard the Oneida, soon after purchasing the yacht in March 1913

The yacht was originally owned by George William Childs Drexel (1868–1944), son of Anthony Joseph Drexel, and named the Alcedo. It was sold to John Hays Hammond, who renamed it the Atreus, in 1912. In March 1913 Hammond sold the yacht to Commodore E. C. Benedict for a reported $100,000.

"Benedict has decided to re-christen the yacht Oneida, which is the name of a smaller yacht which he also possesses," reported The New York Times. "He will rename the latter." The old Oneida was renamed Adelante and converted into a tow vessel, and the new Oneida became a fixture in the yachting centers of the East Coast.

On April 24, 1913, Benedict set out on his fourth South American trip in his new Oneida, to see the Panama Canal before it was opened and to sail through the new waterway. An avid yachtsman and fisherman, Benedict took many extended ocean trips in the company of many friends and distinguished guests.

In July 1917 the Oneida was ordered taken by the U.S. Navy for service during World War I, and the yacht was given the identification number SP-432. In September 1917 the orders were cancelled, and the Oneida continued to remain in Benedict's possession. Within the year the yacht was equipped with oil-burning boilers that increased her cruising radius to 4,000 miles. The yacht was reconstructed and overhauled in 1920, when its length was increased and state-of-the art equipment and luxurious fittings were installed.

In August 1922 the Oneida was purchased from Benedict's estate by publisher William Randolph Hearst, owner of the International Film Service Company of New York, for use by the film studio. Extensive improvements were made under the direction of Cox and Stevens, and the yacht cruised to the Pacific Coast that winter.

On November 19, 1924, American film pioneer Thomas H. Ince died under suspicious circumstances after being a weekend guest on Hearst's yacht. The mystery surrounding his death became an enduring scandal in Hollywood lore.

The Oneida was still in Hearst's hands in 1927, but by 1932 the yacht was in use as a ferry vessel on Lake Champlain. The author of a "Talk of the Town" feature in the October 15, 1932, issue of The New Yorker magazine recognized the Oneida after driving aboard for the crossing from Port Douglas to Burlington, Vermont, and disclosed the yacht's fate:

The ferry company, it came out, had got her at a bargain, taken her through the St. Lawrence and the Richelieu Canal, remodelled her, and put her to work. Passengers who do not themselves recognize the Oneida as the former Hearst yacht are likely to be advised of this chapter of her history anyhow, for over a stairway leading downward from the main deck is a sign: "MUSEUM Admission 10c." Our traveller paid a dime and descended to the museum, which he found to be the Hearst living quarters, faithfully preserved in their elegance: two of the rooms, usually occupied by Mr. Hearst and his secretary in the old days, fitted with mahogany furnishings, dark-red damask hangings, and notably soft and deep bedding accessories; and the third room, Mrs. Hearst's, in ivory and gilt with a bath which even now has gold-plated fittings. The curator of the museum is a young lady who chats interestingly about the Hearsts, dealing in both fact and surmise, and sells souvenir postals of the interior for ten cents each.

On August 21, 1940, the rusty iron hull of the Oneida was sold as scrap to Canada, and used to make munitions for World War II.

== Popular culture ==
In the 2001 film The Cat's Meow, a period drama about the Ince scandal directed by Peter Bogdanovich, the Oneida is represented by a 1931 yacht called the Marala. Originally named Evadne, the property of Charles Fairey, of Fairey Aviation, it served as an anti-submarine patrol vessel during World War II as HMS Evadne.
