= USS Oconto =

Attack transport ship in United States Navy

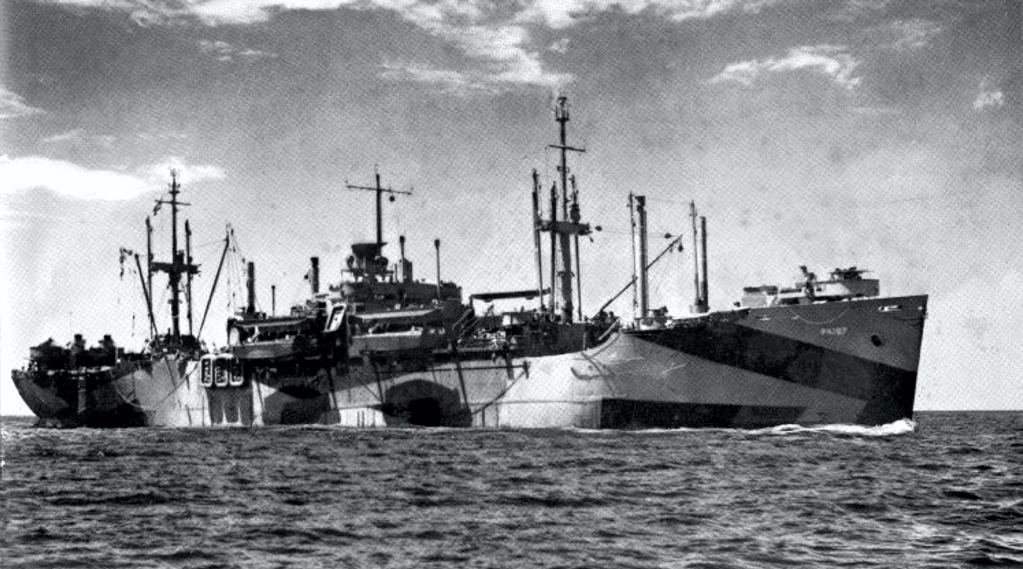
- USS Oconto (APA-187) in camouflage paint, date and place unknown

History

United States
- Name: USS Oconto
- Namesake: Oconto County, Wisconsin
- Ordered: as type VC2-S-AP5; MCV Hull 655
- Laid down: 5 April 1944
- Launched: 20 June 1944
- Acquired: 2 September 1944
- Commissioned: 2 September 1944
- Decommissioned: 22 May 1946
- Stricken: 19 June 1946
- Fate: Sold for scrapping 7 May 1974 to Luria Bros. & Co., delivered 15 Aug 1974

General characteristics
- Displacement: 12,450 tons (full load)
- Length: 455 ft 0 in (138.68 m)
- Beam: 62 ft 0 in (18.90 m)
- Draught: 24 ft 0 in (7.32 m)
- Speed: 19 knots
- Capacity: 150,000 cu. ft, 2,900 tons
- Complement: 56 Officers 480 Enlisted
- Armament: one 5 in (130 mm) gun mount, twelve 40 mm gun mounts, ten 20 mm gun mounts

USS Oconto (APA-187) was a Haskell-class attack transport acquired by the U.S. Navy during World War II for the task of transporting troops to and from combat areas.

== World War II service ==
Oconto (APA–187), formerly MCV Hull 655, was laid down under a United States Maritime Commission contract 5 April 1944 by Kaiser Shipbuilding Corporation, Vancouver, Washington; launched 20 June 1944; sponsored by Mrs. J. Wallace Neighbor; acquired by the Navy 2 September 1944; and commissioned the same day.

=== Landing troops and their equipment in the Philippines ===
After fitting out and shakedown off the U.S. West Coast, Oconto loaded mail and troops in San Francisco, and sailed 27 October 1944 for New Guinea, arriving Oro Bay 14 November. Several days later she left for Nouméa, New Caledonia, where she remained for a month prior to conducting amphibious exercises off Guadalcanal in preparation for the Lingayen Gulf landings on Luzon. Oconto departed Manus 2 January 1945 and, after sailing the length of the Philippines, offloaded troops and cargo for two days beginning the 11th. Returning south, the transport again loaded troops, at Biak, Netherlands East Indies, and landed them on Mindoro. Retiring to Leyte Gulf 12 February, she prepared the following six weeks for her next objective: Okinawa.

=== End-of-war operations ===
This landing proved to be the most trying yet for Oconto. During her time off the beach from 1 to 4 April, there were numerous air raids, as she downed her first kamikaze and assisted in splashing a second. A respite in order, Oconto sailed to Seattle, Washington, for three weeks of general repairs and liberty. She left again 21 May, steaming via San Francisco, Oahu, and other islands for Saipan, where she embarked reinforcements for Okinawa. Stopping briefly at Ulithi, she arrived off Okinawa 24 July and spent the next 10 days unloading troops and cargo, dodging Japanese air attacks, and weathering a typhoon.

=== "Mopping up" operations ===
Departing for the U.S. West Coast on 6 August, Oconto’s eastward progress stopped at Ulithi as rumors of a Japanese surrender increased. She returned to the Philippines, loaded occupation units, and sailed for Japan, arriving at Yokohama on 8 September. After transporting over a thousand liberated prisoners of war to Manila on the first leg of their journey home, Oconto returned to Japan, then made one supply run to Taku, China, before entering Manila Bay for the last time 8 November. A load of Seabees was transported from Manila to Guam, and Oconto proceeded to Okinawa to pick up her first homeward bound passengers in eight months. She made one more “magic-carpet” voyage, leaving the U.S. West Coast for Guam on 11 January 1946.

== Post-war decommissioning ==
Oconto returned to San Francisco, then sailed to Norfolk, Virginia, arriving 20 March. Decommissioning 22 May, she was turned over to the War Shipping Administration 31 May and struck from the Navy List 19 June 1946. Oconto was berthed in the James River, Virginia, as part of the National Defense Reserve Fleet. She was sold for scrapping on 7 May 1974 to Luria Bros. & Co.. She was delivered on 15 Aug 1974.

== Military awards and honors ==
Oconto earned 1 battle star for World War II service.
