= USS Adelante =

Patrol vessel of the United States Navy

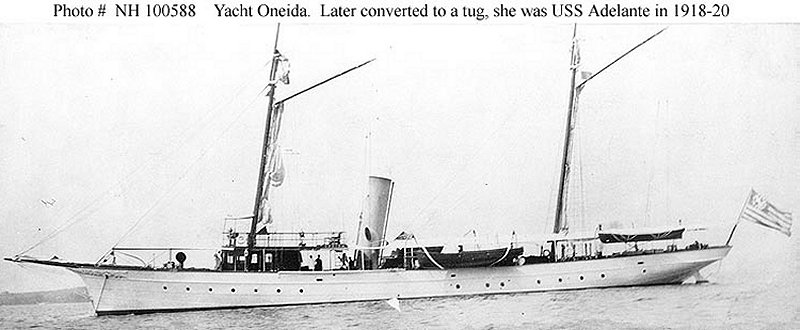
- Yacht Oneida, later Adelante; photographed prior to World War I.

History
- Name: USS Adelante (SP-765)
- Builder: Delaware River Iron Ship Building and Engine Works, Chester, Pennsylvania
- Yard number: 226
- Launched: 1883
- Acquired: 25 August 1918
- Commissioned: 17 December 1918
- Decommissioned: 18 August 1919
- Identification: ON 25281
- Fate: Sold, 25 March 1920 to J. Daniel Gully, Brooklyn, NY; Abandoned, 1 January 1941 due to age and deterioration.

General characteristics
- Tonnage: 142 GRT 71 Net tons
- Length: 138 ft (42.1 m) length overall, 121 ft (36.9 m) length at waterline
- Beam: 20 ft 7 in (6.27 m)
- Draft: 9 ft 6 in (2.9 m))
- Installed power: 2 boilers
- Propulsion: 1 vertical compound engine, one shaft
- Speed: 13 Knots
- Complement: 38
- Armament: none

The iron-hulled, single-screw steam yacht Utowana was completed in 1883 at Chester, Pennsylvania, by the Delaware River Iron Ship Building and Engine Works for Washington Everett Connor. On sale to Elias Cornelius Benedict the yacht's name was changed to Oneida (1887), then when Benedict bought a new yacht to be named Oneida and sale of the old yacht and conversion to a tow boat the name was changed to Adelante (1913). During Benedict's ownership Oneida was the covert site of an operation on President Grover Cleveland, a friend of Benedict's and frequent guest on the yacht, to remove a cancerous tumor in his mouth.

She was taken over by the U.S. Navy in August 1918 and commissioned as USS Adelante (SP-765) in December 1918. Employed in setting up radio compass stations along the Maine coast, she was also used as a boarding boat, meeting vessels arriving off the port of Boston. USS Adelante was decommissioned in August 1919 and sold in March 1920, subsequently operating as a commercial tow boat under the names John Gully and Salvager. The ship was abandoned in 1941.

== Construction ==
Utowana was built by the Delaware River Iron Ship Building and Engineering Works as hull number 226 for Washington Everett Connor and on registration assigned the official number 25254 and the signal letters KBND. (Note: Colton has ON 25281, but contemporary registers show 25354 for this vessel. The 25281 is the official number of the larger (414 GRT) Utowana built 1891.) The vessel had registered characteristics of 141 Gross Registered tons, 71 Net tons, 138 ft 0 in (42.1 m) length overall, 121 ft 0 in (36.9 m) length at waterline, 20 ft 7 in (6.3 m) extreme width, 10 ft 0 in (3.0 m) depth, and draft of 8 ft 6 in (2.6 m) (Lloyd's Register of American Yachts) / 9 ft 6 in (2.9 m)) (Ships' Data U.S. Naval Vessels). The maximum and cruising speed was 12 knots (14 mph; 22 km/h) with a rated endurance of 1,850 nautical miles (2,130 mi; 3,430 km) driven by two boilers and a single vertical compound engine of 420 ihp. (Note: Published reports note the speed as 13 knots (15 mph; 24 km/h) perhaps based on racing records.)

== Private ownership ==
=== Washington Everett Connor ===
The yacht's first owner was the financier and stock broker Washington Everett Connor who was a member of the American Yacht Club, Larchmont Yacht Club and Boston Yacht Club. On 21 May 1883 Connor offered a challenge cup to the Boston Yacht Club with an invitation to members to also join the American Yacht Club in New York. The first race for the cup was on 1 September 1883 with six boats entered and competing for the Connor Cup. Utowana with Mr. Connor and his guests George Gould (Note: Son of Jay Gould. Connor was Gould's stockbroker.) and Mr. Lawrence aboard attended the regatta for the new yacht's first appearance in Boston. In a fairly short period during 1885 the yacht suffered two casualties, the first striking a pier in the North River and the second striking a rock in the Connecticut River with damage enough to require dry docking. Utowana was entered in races and is recorded as winning the Lundborg's Cup, open to yachts of one class with any size or type boiler, in the Second Annual Race of the American Steam Yacht Club from Larchmont, New York to New London, Connecticut. By August 1885 the yacht was reported to be sold to the Colombian Government to be used as a warship on the Magdalena River fighting insurgents. Before the sale was completed the Colombian revolt was over, the government representative had gone home and the yacht remained in the hands of her original owner.

=== E. Van Rensselaer Thayer ===
On 5 December 1885 Utowana was sold to E. Van Rensselaer Thayer of Boston.

=== Elias Cornelius Benedict ===
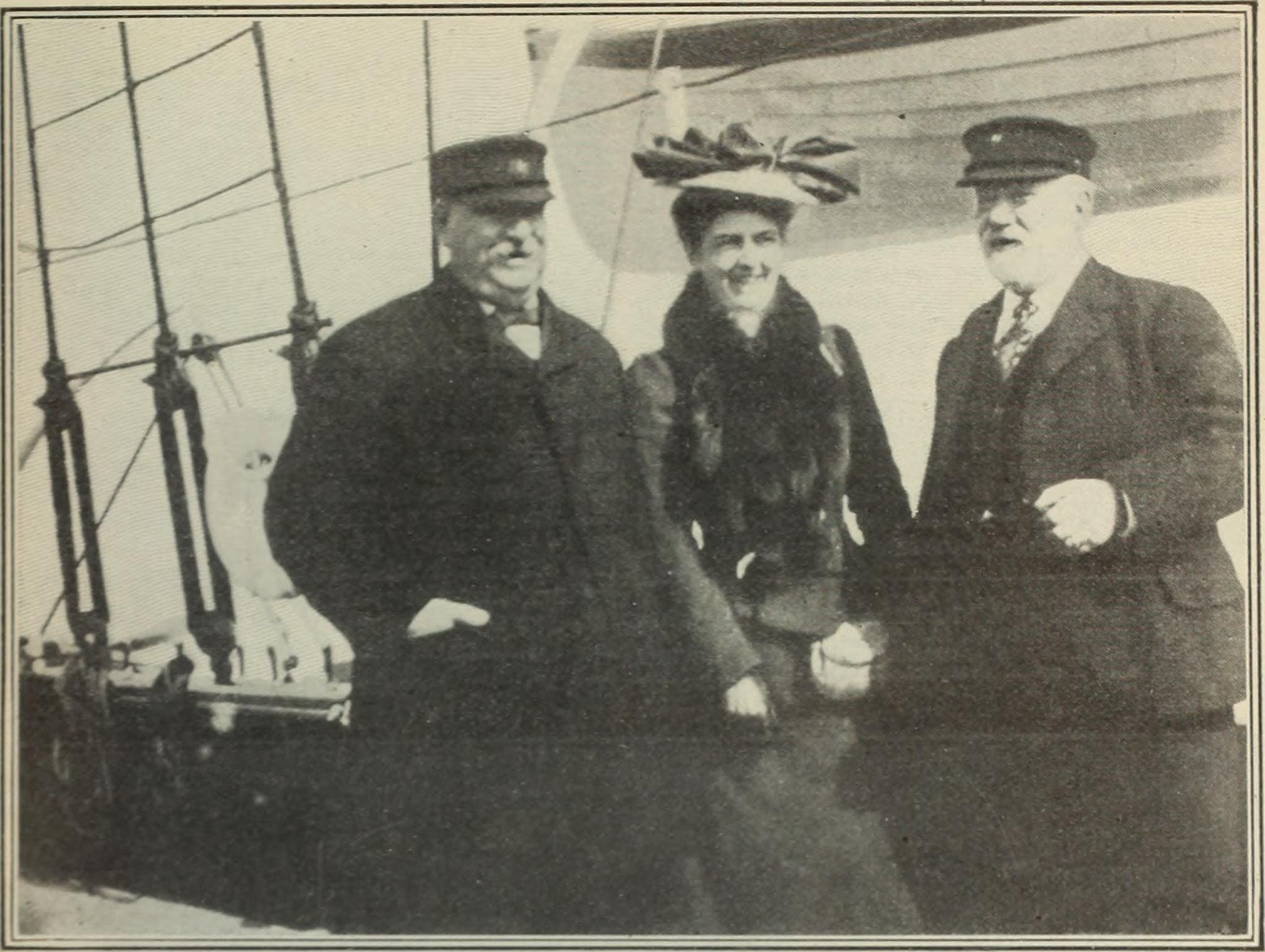
Mr. and Mrs. Cleveland and Commodore Benedict on the Steam Yacht Oneida (ca. 1890)

In 1887 Utowana was bought by prominent New York City banker Elias Cornelius Benedict, one of the world's leading yachtsman, and renamed the Oneida. Among the friends and distinguished guests Benedict hosted were Edwin Booth, Thomas Bailey Aldrich and Lawrence Barrett, who conceived The Players club while being entertained on the Oneida in 1887. Grover Cleveland was a close friend and was a frequent visitor aboard Oneida having spent considerable time in Long Island Sound or off Cape Cod fishing.

==== Secret Presidential surgery ====
The Oneida served as an impromptu hospital on 1 July 1893, when doctors performed a secret operation on Benedict's close friend, President Grover Cleveland. The Panic of 1893 was underway and a cancerous growth had been found on the roof of the President's mouth. To avoid creating greater panic with the news of the newly elected Cleveland's condition Cleveland himself decided the best place to have the operation in secret was aboard his friend's yacht where his presence would not be particularly notable. The plan was to perform the surgery as the yacht cruised from New York City to Cleveland's summer home, Gray Gables, on Buzzards Bay in Massachusetts where Mrs. Cleveland would be waiting and the patient could recover under the guise of a normal retreat to his summer home.

The President's personal physician, Joseph D. Bryant, assembled a surgical team led by William Williams Keen as well as overseeing the preparations aboard Oneida. Those involved stripping the saloon of all furniture except an organ that was fixed to the deck and sterilizing the space. Necessary medical supplies, including tanks of nitrous oxide and oxygen and were delivered quietly to the yacht. There would be no operating table with a large chair lashed to the mast being the substitute. The crew was told the President required removal of teeth as a cover for the preparations. On 30 June Keen and four assisting doctors made their way to the yacht by boat from separate points with Cleveland and Bryant boarding in the evening for the night aboard before sailing the next morning. With calm weather the surgery was done shortly after noon as the ship transited Long Island Sound with the removal of the tumor, five teeth, as well as much of the upper left palate and jawbone. On 5 July Cleveland arrived at Gray Gables to recuperate and was fishing in Buzzards Bay by the end of July. The surgery remained secret even after Cleveland's death in 1908, though journalist Elisha Jay Edwards published the story and his reputation suffered in the subsequent successful denials. Only in 1917, when surgeon Keen published in The Saturday Evening Post and expressed regrets as to how Edwards had suffered accusations of making up the story, did the truth become public.

== Tow boat Adelante ==
In 1913 Benedict purchased a larger yacht, Atreus (formerly Alcedo, official number 107293) that he christened the Oneida. He sold the "old" Oneida which was renamed the Adelante and converted into a tow vessel. The converted vessel had almost nothing of the former yacht's appearance with deckhouse and superstructure much more typical of tugs of the time.

== U.S. Naval service ==
Inspected by the Navy in the 1st Naval District on 9 July 1918, for potential use as a "tow boat," Adelante was apparently not delivered to the Navy until 25 August 1918. Routing instructions indicate that she spent late July in coastwise operations between Philadelphia, New York, Providence, and Boston. Contemporary Navy documentation lists her as a "tug." Her owner at that time (1918), and master, was Theodore Krumm of Melrose, Massachusetts from whom the vessel was purchased for $57,500.

Given the classification of SP-765 (or Id.No. 765 in some sources), Adelante was commissioned at Lawley's Shipyard, Neponset, Massachusetts, on 17 December 1918. After fitting out alongside Battery Wharf, and at the Section Base, Boston, through mid-February 1919, Adelante dressed ship on 24 February in honor of the arrival in Boston of President Woodrow Wilson on board the transport George Washington, and stood out as part of the veritable armada of ships which proceeded to greet the returning Chief Executive as his ship arrived, appropriately enough, in President Roads.

After having returned to Battery Wharf, Adelante got underway for Portland, Maine, the following day and arrived at Portland an hour before midnight. The following morning, she moved to Damariscove Island where she helped to establish one of a network of radio compass stations along the Maine coast. Such a system had originally been installed during the war to detect enemy submarines operating off the coast, to "home in" on their radio transmissions and to determine their direction and distance. Wartime experience with those stations showed that the concept held great promise for peacetime use. As Secretary of the Navy Josephus Daniels reported in 1919, "The system of radio compasses on shore ... proved such a useful aid to navigation that during the past year additional stations have been constructed."

Adelante continued this work through the end of March, frequenting, besides Damariscove Island, Boothbay and Portland. Working parties, averaging a dozen men, went ashore almost daily to build the station at Damariscove Island, one of the additional 19 stations being added to the original 29 that had been set up on the Atlantic, Pacific, and Gulf Coasts. While at Boothbay on the last day of March, she received orders directing her to return to Boston. Underway at 04:10 on 1 April, Adelante reached Boston at 13:45.

After shifting her berth to the opposite side of Boston harbor the next morning, Adelante got underway and met the troop transport Mount Vernon as the "boarding boat" for the customs officers. She put these inspectors on board at 13:00 and returned with passengers that she disembarked a little over an hour later.

Adelante's temporary duty as "boarding boat" continued through much of April. The ships she met included Agamemnon on the 7th; Mongolia on the 10th; Patricia, a transport, on the 17th; City of Birmingham (also on the 17th); Winifredia on the 21st; Vedic and City of Bombay on the 22d; and New Jersey (Battleship No. 16) on the 23d. Two events highlighted the period: the first came on 5 April when she carried Major General Edwards, USA, and his staff out to board the incoming transport America in President Roads, the second occurred on 21 April, when Lt. Keith gave a talk on the Liberty Loan drive. He apparently proved persuasive and patriotic, for all hands purchased bonds, making Adelante a "100 percent ship," enabling her to hoist a "100 percent pennant" to her foremast signifying the achievement.

Her temporary job completed, Adelante sailed, on the 24th—via Gloucester, Massachusetts—for Rockland, Maine, which she reached on the 25th to resume her work establishing the compass stations. The ship began work on the station at Cross Island, Northeast Cove, on 28 April, and continued this task until 3 May. She then proceeded, via Rockland, to Boston before returning, via Bar Harbor, to Cross Island on the 6th. Shifting briefly to Machiasport, Adelante embarked an inspection party on the 8th to review the status of the work on Cross Island. The party then inspected the station at Damariscove Island the following day (9 May) before Adelante set course for Boston to take on construction supplies and stores (including lumber). She subsequently resumed work at Cross Island on 21 May; based at Machiasport, Adelante touched at Cranberry Isles and White-head Island (14 June) to inspect the radio compass station there. Between 13 and 15 June, she also carried Capt. Cantwell, USCG, on an inspection tour of Coast Guard bases in the vicinity.

Adelante's men resumed work at Cross Island on the 23rd before the ship visited Mount Desert Island, and then at Machiasport (28–30 June) before returning to Cross Island on the 30th.

Adelante returned – via Machiasport and Rockland – to Boston which she reached on 3 July. She was decommissioned there on 18 August 1919.

== Return to private ownership ==
Sold to J. Daniel Gully, of Brooklyn, N.Y., on 25 March 1920, Adelante was renamed John Gully soon thereafter. In subsequent years, the ship—now classed as a "tow boat"—was renamed Salvager by 1924 and was operated first by the H. J. Wheeler Salvage Co., Inc., of New York (1924–27) and then by the Salvage Process Corp., of New York (1927–40). By 1 January 1941, Salvager had been abandoned, due to age and deterioration.

== See also ==
- List of patrol vessels of the United States Navy
- USS Oneida (SP-432)
