= Bon Air (Tampa) =

- Neighborhood
- Location within the state of Florida
- Coordinates: 27°56′31″N 82°30′18″W
- Country: United States
- State: Florida
- County: Hillsborough
- City: Tampa
- Time zone: UTC-5 (Eastern (EST))
  - Summer (DST): UTC-4 (EDT)

Bon Air is a neighborhood within the district of West Tampa, which represents District 6 of the Tampa City Council. The estimated population recorded was 858.

== Geography ==
Bon Air is located at latitude 27.942 north and longitude 82.505 west. The elevation is 20 feet above sea level. Its boundaries are roughly Dale Mabry Highway to the west, John F. Kennedy Boulevard to the north, and Henderson Boulevard to the south and east.

== Demographics ==
In the census of 2000, there was a population of 1,225. The population density was 4,508 per square mile. The population was 48% white, 8% black, 2% Asian, and 38% Hispanic. 3% reported as being two or more races. 13% of all households had a female householder with no husband present. The per capita income for the neighborhood was $24,095. About 9% of the population were below the poverty line.

In the neighborhood the population was spread out, with 18.7% under the age of 20, 39.1% from 20 to 39, 24.2% from 40 to 59, and 17.9% who were 60 years of age or older.
