= Gray Gables =

Estate in Bourne, Massachusetts, US

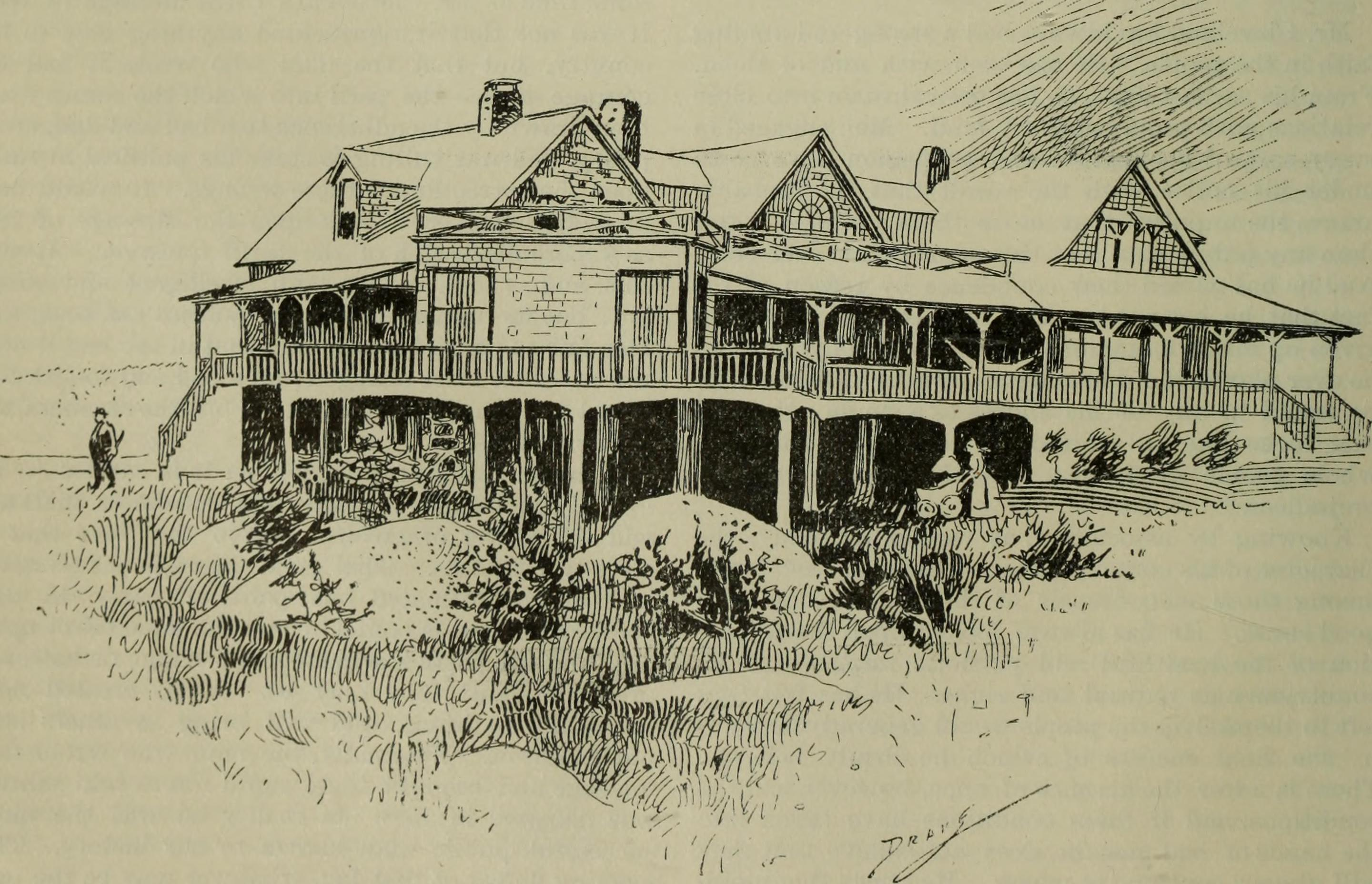
- Sketch of Gray Gables (1890)

- Location within Cape Cod Location within Massachusetts Location within the United States
- Former names: Tudor Haven

General information
- Architectural style: Shingle style architecture
- Location: Bourne, Massachusetts
- Coordinates: 41.7343°N 70.6240°W
- Estimated completion: 1880
- Renovated: 1890
- Destroyed: December 11, 1973 (fire)
- Owner: Grover Cleveland (1890–1908); Cleveland family (1908–1920); Gray Gables Ocean House (until 1973)

Design and construction
- Known for: Grover Cleveland's Summer White House

Other information
- Number of rooms: 20

Gray Gables was an estate in Bourne, Massachusetts, owned by President Grover Cleveland that served as his Summer White House from 1893 to 1896. It was later converted into the Gray Gables Ocean House hotel, which was destroyed in a fire in 1973.

== History ==
=== Grover Cleveland ===
Gray Gables was built in 1880 and was named Tudor Haven by its first owners. Grover Cleveland purchased the house for $20,000 in 1890 (equivalent to $640,000 in 2024), renovating it and renaming it Gray Gables. The property at the time consisted of 110 acres (45 ha), 1.5 miles (2.4 km) of beachfront on Buzzards Bay, the main house, and a hunting lodge. He had initially tried to purchase Harbor Lane, a home in Marion, Massachusetts, where he had spent his previous four summers, but decided not to after the owners raised the price.

In 1892, Cleveland ran for what would be his second term as president, and an electric telegraph was installed in the house so he could follow the Democratic National Convention in Chicago. That fall, he won the election, and Gray Gables served as his Summer White House from 1893 to 1896. In 1892, the small Gray Gables Railroad Station was built nearby on the Old Colony Railroad to provide easy transportation to Washington, D.C. A dock was also constructed next to the house to accommodate a Navy gunboat.

In 1893, Cleveland recovered at Gray Gables following a secret surgery to remove a tumor aboard his friend Elias Cornelius Benedict's yacht Utowana as it sailed from New York City to Gray Gables. Two of his children were born at the house: Marion in 1895 and Francis Grover in 1903. Following his presidency, the Cleveland family continued to summer at Gray Gables until 1904, when his daughter Ruth died of diphtheria at the age of 12. After her death, the family stopped summering there and rented out the house. Grover Cleveland died in 1908, and the family sold the house in 1920.

=== Gray Gables Ocean House ===
In the mid-20th century, the property was converted to a restaurant and hotel known as the Gray Gables Ocean House. The hotel was destroyed by fire on the morning of December 11, 1973. In the 2000s, a private home was built on the former site of Gray Gables.

== Legacy ==
The neighborhood of Gray Gables and the former Gray Gables Railroad Station in Bourne take their names from the house. In 1976, the station building was moved to the Aptucxet Trading Post Museum. Because of the time Grover Cleveland spent summering at Gray Gables and fishing in Buzzards Bay, a shallow area of Buzzards Bay, Cleveland Ledge, was named after him, as was the 1943 lighthouse Cleveland East Ledge Light that sits on top of it.

== See also ==
- List of residences of presidents of the United States
