= USS Olmsted =

1944 Haskell-class attack transport

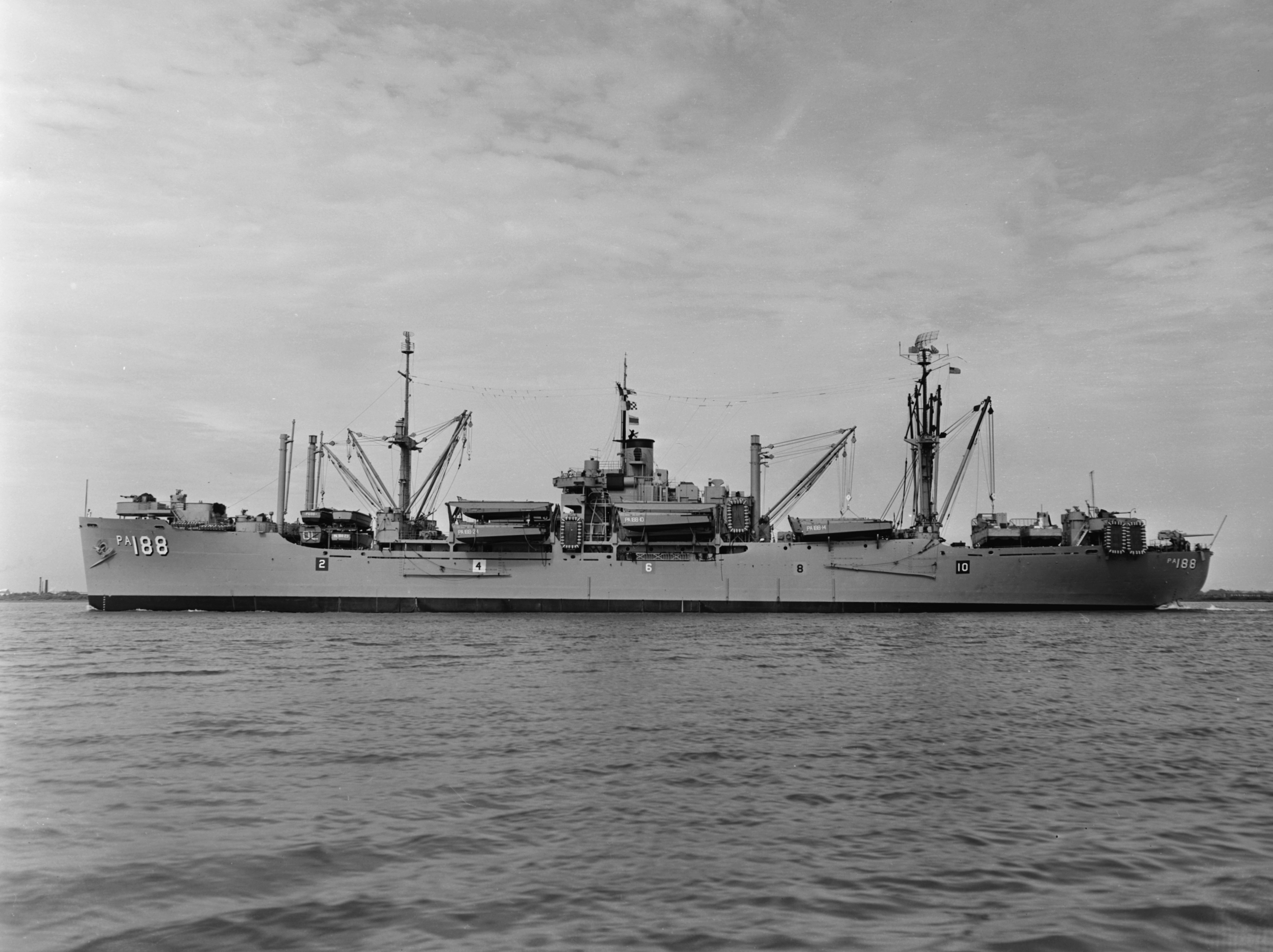
- USS Olmsted (APA-188) in 1954

History

United States
- Name: Olmsted
- Namesake: Olmsted County, Minnesota
- Ordered: as a Type VC2-S-AP5 hull, MCE hull 656
- Builder: Kaiser Shipbuilding Company, Vancouver, Washington
- Yard number: 656
- Laid down: 11 April 1944
- Launched: 4 July 1944
- Sponsored by: Mrs. Duncan Gregg
- Commissioned: 5 September 1944
- Decommissioned: 21 February 1947
- Recommissioned: 2 February 1952
- Decommissioned: 27 February 1959
- Stricken: 1 July 1960
- Identification: Hull symbol: APA-188; Code letters: NDVV
- Motto: "You Call We Haul"
- Honors and awards: 1 × battle stars for World War II service
- Fate: Sold for scrapping, 1 August 1981

General characteristics
- Class & type: Haskell-class attack transport
- Type: Type VC2-S-AP5
- Displacement: 6,873 long tons (6,983 t) (light load); 14,837 long tons (15,075 t) (full load)
- Length: 455 ft (139 m)
- Beam: 62 ft (19 m)
- Draft: 24 ft (7.3 m)
- Installed power: 2 × Babcock & Wilcox header-type boilers, 465 psi (3,210 kPa) 750 °F (399 °C); 8,500 shp (6,300 kW)
- Propulsion: 1 × Westinghouse geared turbine; 1 × propeller
- Speed: 17.7 kn (32.8 km/h; 20.4 mph) (ship's trials)
- Boats & landing craft carried: 2 × LCMs; 1 × open LCPL; 18 × LCVPs; 2 × LCPRs; 1 × closed LCPL (Captain's Gig)
- Capacity: 2,900 long tons (2,900 t) DWT; 150,000 cu ft (4,200 m^{3}) (non-refrigerated)
- Troops: 87 officers, 1,475 enlisted
- Complement: 99 officers, 593 enlisted
- Armament: 1 × 5 in (127 mm)/38-caliber dual-purpose gun; 1 × quad 40 mm (1.6 in) Bofors anti-aircraft (AA) gun mounts; 4 × twin 40 mm Bofors (AA) gun mounts; 10 × single 20 mm (0.8 in) Oerlikon cannons AA mounts

Service record
- Part of: TransRon 14
- Operations: Assault and occupation of Okinawa Gunto (1–22 April 1945)
- Awards: American Campaign Medal; Asiatic–Pacific Campaign Medal; World War II Victory Medal; National Defense Service Medal; Philippine Liberation Medal

USS Olmsted (APA-188) was a Haskell-class attack transport that saw service with the US Navy for the task of transporting troops to and from combat areas. She was of the VC2-S-AP5 Victory ship design type. Olmsted was named for Olmsted County, Minnesota.

== World War II service ==
Olmsted (APA–188), approved 16 March 1944, was laid down by Kaiser Shipbuilding Co., Vancouver, Washington, 11 April 1944, as MCV Hull no. 656; launched 4 July 1944; sponsored by Mrs. Duncan Gregg; accepted and commissioned 5 September 1944.

=== Western Pacific operations ===
On completion of shakedown 27 October 1944, Olmsted joined the U.S. Pacific Fleet. Transporting troops and supplies in support of amphibious operations, she spent the last year of the war in the Pacific Ocean with an itinerary that reads like a summary of the war's climactic stages: New Guinea, the Admiralties, Leyte, Lingayen Gulf, Okinawa and Japan.

Apparently charmed, she was bombed at Luzon and again at Okinawa without damage. Twice before the surrender of Japan, she returned to the States to lift reserve troops into the battle zone. She was in Japan to participate in the first occupational landings there, debarking the Army's 81st (Wildcat) Division.

=== Getting U.S. troops back to the States ===
Landing the 81st at Honshū was Olmsted's last full dress amphibious operation before post war "Operation Magic Carpet" duty. Olmsted made three voyages from the states to the war torn Western Pacific to return veterans and materials until she was ordered to the U.S. East Coast for deactivation.

== Reactivated during Korean War ==
On 21 February 1947, Olmsted was placed out of commission in reserve at Norfolk, Virginia. Due to deteriorating international conditions, Olmsted was recalled to active service and commissioned 2 February 1952 under command of Captain R. C. Leonard, and assigned to the Amphibious Force, Atlantic Fleet.

After shakedown, operating out of Norfolk, Olmsted participated in training exercises along the U.S. East Coast, at Guantánamo Bay and in the Mediterranean conducting amphibious assault landings. Her primary mission was training Marines and Sailors in Amphibious Warfare tactics. She also conducted training cruises for Midshipmen and Naval Reservists. With interim periods for overhaul and operational readiness training, Olmsted served in this capacity until she decommissioned 27 February 1959, at Norfolk, Virginia, and was assigned to the Norfolk Group, Atlantic Reserve Fleet, 14 January 1960.

=== Fate ===
Transferred to the custody of MARAD, 30 June 1960, Olmsted was struck from the Naval Register 1 July 1960.

On 1 August 1983, the Waterman Steamship Corporation bought Olmsted and then resold her to Balbao Desquaces Maritimos for scrapping. She was withdrawn from the fleet on 16 September 1983.

== Military awards and honors ==
Olmsted earned one battle stars for service in World War II.

== Bibliography ==
Online resources

- "Olmsted". Dictionary of American Naval Fighting Ships. Navy Department, Naval History and Heritage Command. 17 August 2015. This article incorporates text from this source, which is in the public domain.
- "Kaiser Vancouver, Vancouver WA". Shipbuilding History. 27 November 2010.
- "USS Olmsted (LPA-188)". NavSource. 5 May 2017.
- "Olmsted (APA-188)". United States Department of Transportation. Archived from the original on 13 September 2018.
- "Olmsted (LPA 188)". Navy Vessel Register. 5 April 2007.
