= USS Oneida (APA-221) =

1944 American Haskell-class attack transport

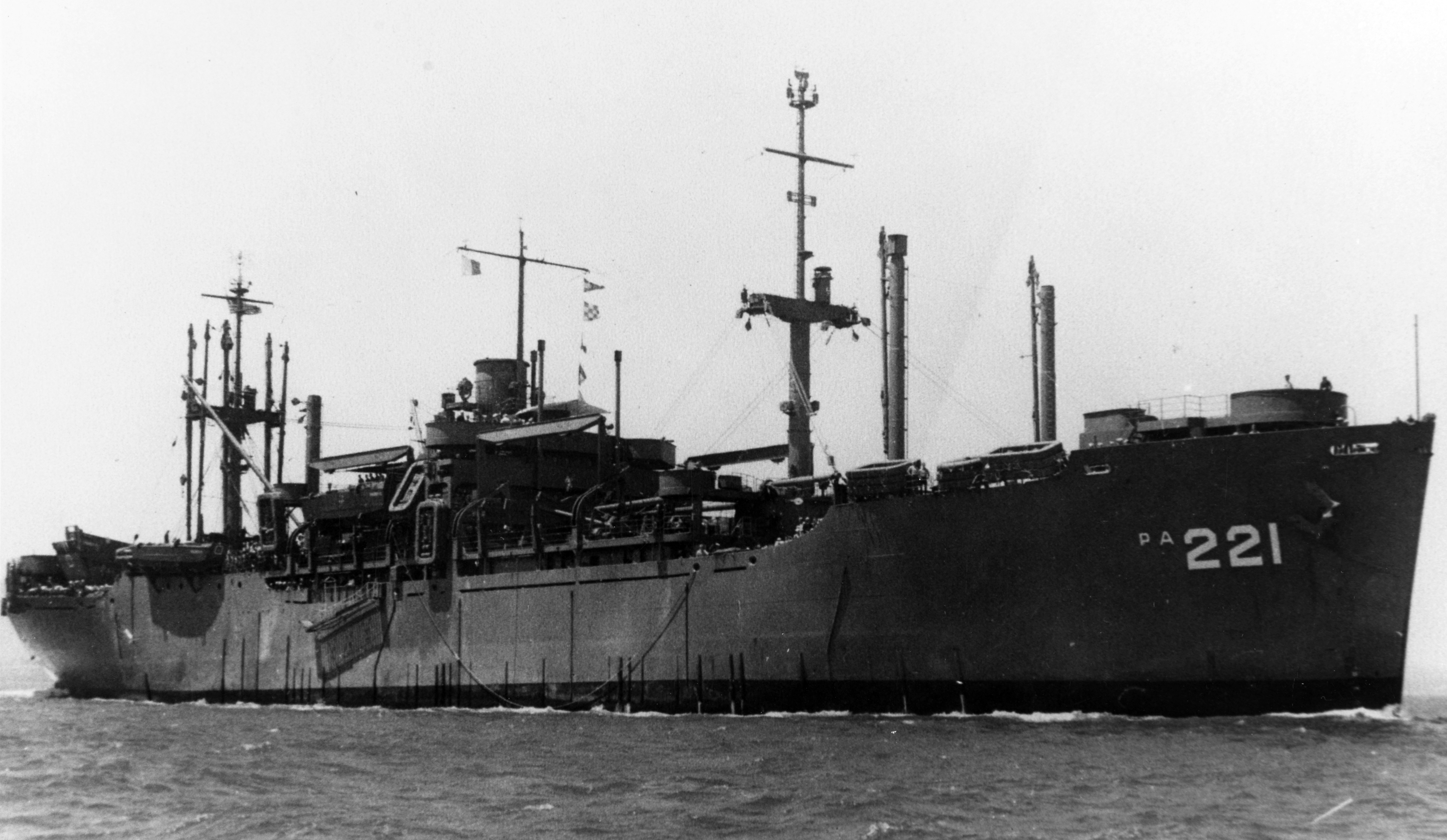

History

United States
- Name: Oneida
- Namesake: Oneida County, Idaho; Oneida County, New York; Oneida County, Wisconsin
- Ordered: as a Type VC2-S-AP5 hull, MCE hull 569
- Builder: Permanente Metals Corporation, Richmond, California
- Yard number: 569
- Laid down: 30 September 1944
- Launched: 31 October 1944
- Sponsored by: Mrs Victor E. Cole
- Commissioned: 4 December 1944
- Decommissioned: 27 December 1946
- Stricken: 1 October 1958
- Identification: Hull symbol: APA-221; Code letters: NPRB
- Honors and awards: 1 × battle star for World War II service
- Fate: Scrapped 1975

General characteristics
- Class & type: Haskell-class attack transport
- Type: Type VC2-S-AP5
- Displacement: 6,873 long tons (6,983 t) (light load); 14,837 long tons (15,075 t) (full load)
- Length: 455 ft (139 m)
- Beam: 62 ft (19 m)
- Draft: 24 ft (7.3 m)
- Installed power: 2 × Combustion Engineering header-type boilers, 465 psi (3,210 kPa) 750 °F (399 °C); 8,500 shp (6,338 kW)
- Propulsion: 1 × Westinghouse geared turbine; 1 x propeller
- Speed: 17.7 kn (32.8 km/h; 20.4 mph)
- Boats & landing craft carried: 2 × LCMs; 1 × open LCPL; 18 × LCVPs; 2 × LCPRs; 1 × closed LCPL (Captain's Gig)
- Capacity: 2,900 long tons (2,900 t) DWT; 150,000 cu ft (4,200 m^{3}) (non-refrigerated)
- Troops: 86 officers, 1,475 enlisted
- Complement: 56 officers, 480 enlisted
- Armament: 1 × 5 in (127 mm)/38 caliber dual purpose gun; 1 × quad 40 mm (1.6 in) Bofors anti-aircraft (AA) gun mounts; 4 × twin 40mm Bofors (AA) gun mounts; 10 × single 20 mm (0.8 in) Oerlikon cannons AA mounts

Service record
- Part of: TransRon 23
- Operations: Assault and occupation of Okinawa Gunto (3–28 June 1945)
- Awards: China Service Medal; American Campaign Medal; Asiatic–Pacific Campaign Medal; World War II Victory Medal; Navy Occupation Service Medal

USS Oneida (APA-221) was a Haskell-class attack transport in service with the United States Navy from 1944 to 1946. She was scrapped in 1975.

== History ==
ONeidae was of the VC2-S-AP5 Victory ship, built as SS Oneida Victory, design type and named after Oneida County, Idaho, Oneida County, New York and Oneida County, Wisconsin (the name "Oneida" itself originates from an Iroquoian Indian tribe living in New York state and its environs). The ship was approved for construction on 26 May 1944, laid down 30 September 1944, under a Maritime Commission (MARCOM) contract, MCV hull 569, by Permanente Metals Corporation, Yard No. 2, Richmond, California; and launched 31 October 1944. She was acquired by the Navy on a loan-charter basis, and accepted and commissioned on 4 December 1944.

=== World War II ===
After shakedown, Oneida embarked troops and sailed for Pearl Harbor on 30 January 1945, arriving 6 February. On 13 February, she was underway again, laden with troops en route to Eniwetok. From Eniwetok, she steamed to Ulithi and arrived on 28 February, joining the armada of ships at anchor there. As far as the eye could see, stretched the vast and growing Task Force 58 which was preparing for a drive into the Japanese home islands.

On 27 March, Oneida sailed for Guam carrying survivors of aircraft carrier USS Franklin (CV-13). The next day, she discharged the Franklin's Marine air groups and picked up casualties of the bloody fight on Iwo Jima and headed back to Pearl Harbor. Leaving the wounded in Pearl, she took on board a large contingent of the 10th Army bound for Okinawa.

Approaching Okinawa on 23 May, Oneida was ordered to stand off as the island came under attack from one of its frequent kamikaze raids. Within the first 24 hours of her arrival, Oneida witnessed 56 separate raids on the island. Finally on 3 June, Oneida was called in and discharged her passengers under continuing Japanese air raids.

Oneida departed Okinawa on 6 June, and returned on 24 June, with US Army replacements and 8th Air Corps personnel. Discharging these, she took on board 1,050 Japanese prisoners, and in company with attack transport Grafton, also loaded with prisoners, she sailed for Pearl Harbor. The prisoners were transferred to a camp in Pearl 13 July, and Oneida was again loaded with Army troops.

En route to Okinawa, she made a stop at Ulithi and while anchored there received word of Japan's acceptance of unconditional surrender. With the status of her passengers changed to that of "occupation troops", Oneida proceeded to Okinawa, arriving 22 August.

=== Operation Magic Carpet ===
From 5 September to 18 November, Oneida distributed occupation forces throughout the Far East, from Hollandia to Korea and China. From 18 November 1945 to 16 June 1946, Oneida participated in Operation Magic Carpet, returning veterans to the states and taking replacements overseas for occupation duty.

From 16 June to 27 December, Oneida performed services in local operations off the West Coast.

=== Decommissioning and fate ===
On 27 December 1946, she was placed out of commission, in reserve, and placed in the Pacific Reserve Fleet, Long Beach. She was struck 1 October 1958, from the Naval Vessel Register. On 8 October 1958, Oneida was transferred to the Maritime Administration (MARAD) where she was laid up at in the Suisun Bay Reserve Fleet, Benicia, California. On 8 May 1975, Oneida was sold to General Metals of Tacoma, Inc., under a "non-transportation use" (NTU) or scrap contract, for $256,000. She was withdrawn from the fleet on 9 July 1975.

== Awards ==
Oneida earned one battle stars for services in World War II.

== Notes ==
Citations

== Bibliography ==
Online resources

- "Oneida V (APA-221)". Dictionary of American Naval Fighting Ships. Naval History and Heritage Command. 17 August 2015. This article incorporates text from this source, which is in the public domain.
- "Kaiser Permanente No. 2, Richmond CA". Shipbuilding History. 13 October 2010.
- "USS Oneida (APA-221)". NavSource. 2 May 2014.
- "Oneida (APA-221)". United States Department of Transportation. Archived from the original on 2 November 2016.
