= Elias Cornelius Benedict =

American banker and yachtsman

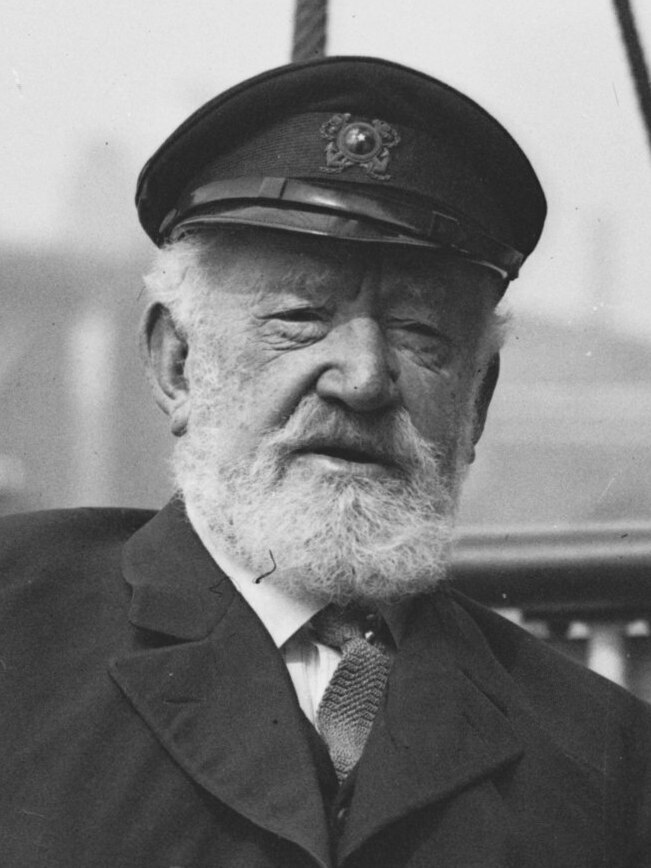
- E.C. Benedict, c. 1913 (aboard Oneida)
- Born: Elias Cornelius Benedict; January 24, 1834; Somers, New York, U.S.
- Died: November 22, 1920 (aged 86); Greenwich, Connecticut, U.S.
- Occupations: Banker, yachtsman
- Spouse: Sarah Hart (m. 1859; died 1907)
- Children: 4

Elias Cornelius Benedict, nicknamed Commodore (January 24, 1834 – November 22, 1920) was an American banker and yachtsman from New York City. He specialized in the gas and rubber industries. He was president of the Commercial Acetylene Gas Company and of the Marine Engine Company. The Benedict Fjord in Greenland was named after him by Robert Peary.

== Early life ==
Benedict was born in 1834 in Somers, New York. His father, Henry Benedict (1796–1869), was a Presbyterian clergyman. His mother was Mary Betts Lockwood (1799–1885), daughter of Captain Stephen Lockwood, of Norwalk, Connecticut. Among his siblings was Henry Martin Benedict, Sarah Jane (née Benedict) Taylor, and Elizabeth (née Benedict) Mead.

== Career ==
At fifteen in 1849, he joined the banking house of Corning & Co., New York. In 1857 he opened his own stockbroker's office on Wall Street. During the United States Civil War he and his brother organized the Gold Exchange Bank.

Benedict was close with President Grover Cleveland, and it was on Benedict's yacht, the Oneida, that Cleveland had his secret surgery to remove a cancerous growth from his jaw in 1893. Benedict commissioned the architects Carrère and Hastings to build an estate on the peninsula at Indian Harbor in Greenwich, Connecticut.

In later life Benedict was Commodore of the Seawanhaka Corinthian Yacht Club.

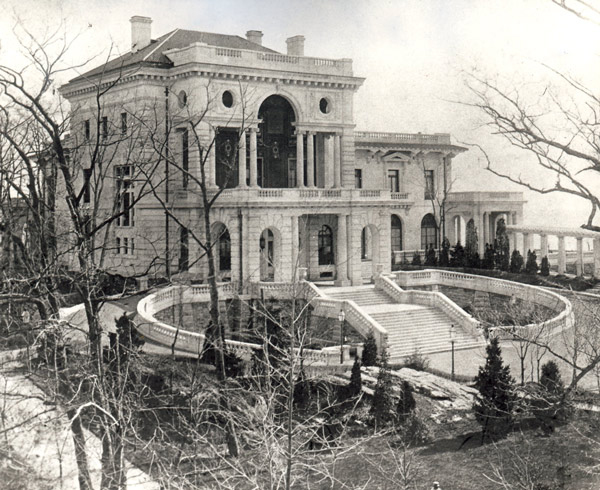
Indian Harbor, built by “Commodore” E.C. Benedict, 1895, on an-80 acre waterfront peninsula. The home and outbuildings were designed by Carrere & Hastings, who collaborated with renowned Olmstead, Olmstead & Eliot on the landscape. The home, although modified, still stands today.

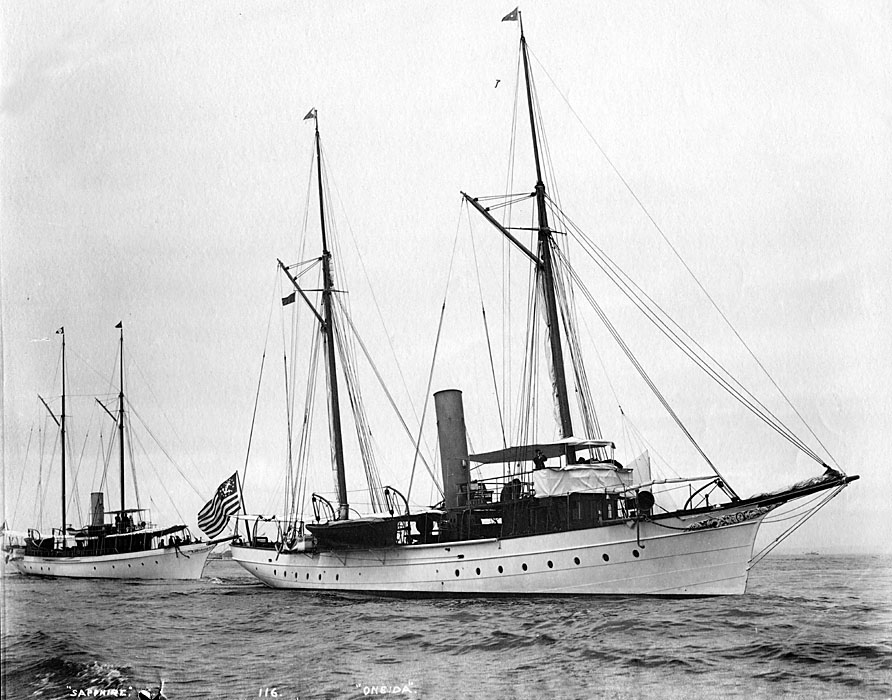
EC Benedict Yacht Oneida leading the way and yacht sapphire following.

== Personal life ==
In 1859, he married Sarah Hart, daughter of Lucius Hart of New York. Together, they had four children:

- Frederick Hart Benedict (1860–1901), who married Henry Flagler's daughter, Jennie Louise; she died after complications from childbirth, along with their child aboard the Benedict yacht Oneida while on their way to see Henry Flagler in St. Augustine, Florida, and Frederick was killed not many years later in an automobile accident near West Point.
- Martha Benedict (1862–1957), who married stockbroker Ramsay Turnbull in 1891.
- Helen Ripley Benedict (1865–1936), who married the architect Thomas Hastings.
- Louise Adele Benedict, who married Clifford B. Harmon.

He had been ill for more than a year when he died on November 22, 1920, at his estate in Greenwich.
