= Alcove =

Alcove may refer to:

== Places ==
- Alcove, Quebec, a town in Quebec, Canada
- Alcove Canyon, a valley in Arizona, U.S.
- Alcove Springs, a former stop along the Oregon Trail in Kansas, U.S.
- Alcove House, in Bandelier National Monument, Los Alamos and Santa Fe counties, New Mexico, United States
- Alcove, New York, a hamlet in New York, U.S.
- Alcove Historic District, Alcove in Albany County, New York, U.S.
- Alcove Reservoir, Albany County, New York, U.S.

== Other uses ==
- Alcove (architecture), a recessed part of a room or a garden
- Alcove (landform), a steep-sided cavity on a rock face, formed through water or wind erosion
- Alcove (Nashville), a skyscraper in Tennessee
- Alcove Entertainment, a film production company
- L'alcôve, 1847 opéra comique by Jacques Offenbach
- The Alcove, a 1985 Italian film
