= Alcove, New York =

Hamlet in the state of New York, United States

- Hamlet
- Location within New York Location within the United States
- Coordinates: 42°28′7″N 73°55′31″W
- Country: United States
- State: New York
- Region: Capital District
- County: Albany
- Town: Coeymans
- Elevation: 545 ft (166 m)

Population (1994)
  - Total: appr. 300
- Time zone: UTC-5 (EST)
  - Summer (DST): UTC-4 (EDT)
- Postal code: 12007
- Area code: 518

Alcove is a hamlet in the town of Coeymans, Albany County, New York, United States. It is a prime example of a 19th-century mill town located at a rural intersection, and as such it is listed on the National Register of Historic Places in the Albany area as the Alcove Historic District. The city of Albany's Alcove Reservoir lies to the west of the hamlet.

== History ==
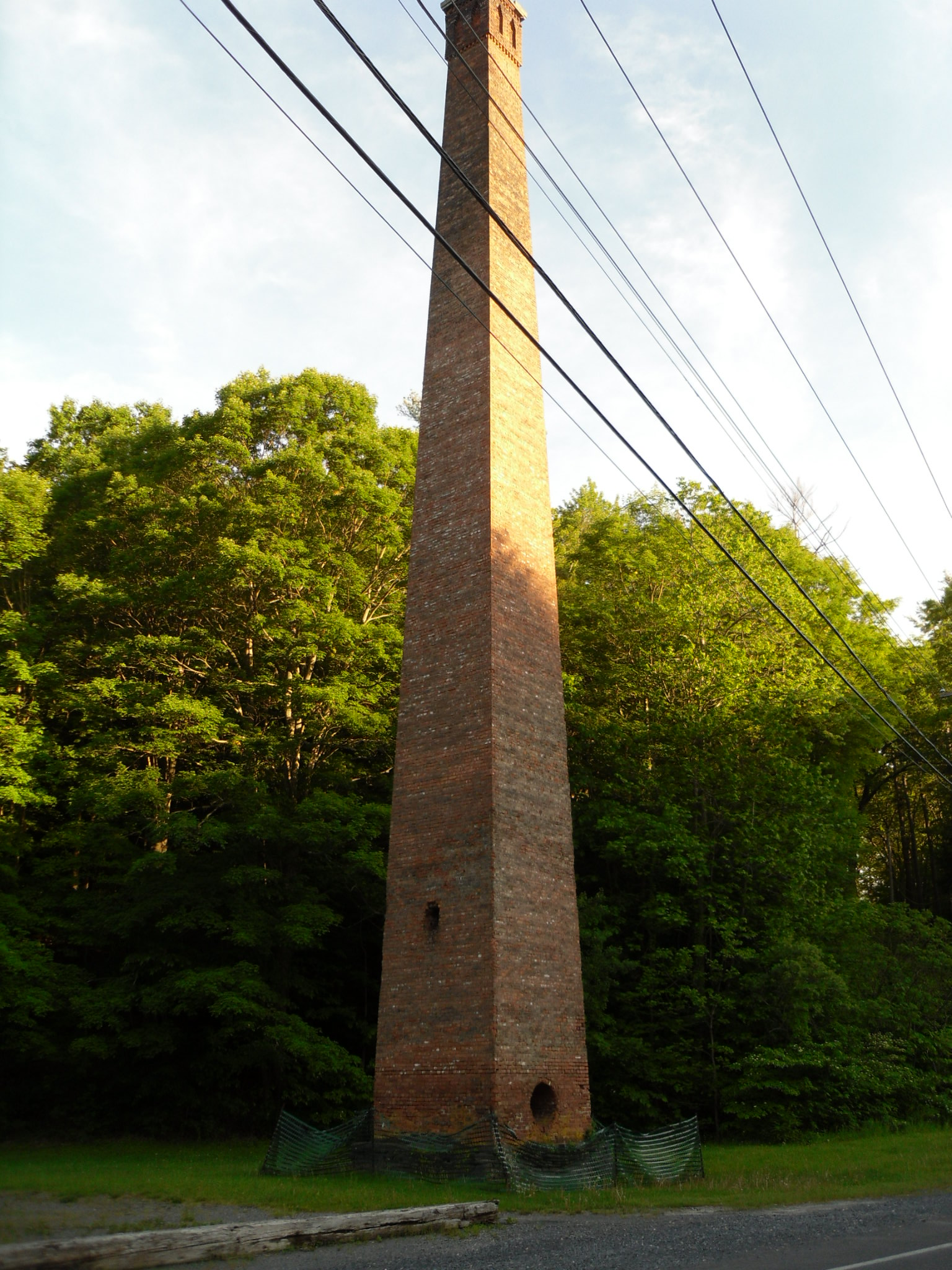
Valley Mill chimney, a National Register of Historic Places site

The history of Alcove is a history of the mills established along the Hannacroix (Haanacrois) Creek. In 1790, an early settler by the name of Casperus Ackerman established the first mill in the area. In 1844, Ephraim Andrews established the Valley Mill for carding of wool and cloth manufacturing along the Hannacroix Creek at the corners of what is now New York State Route 143 and Albany County Route 111. It would be expanded in 1848 and converted to the manufacturing of straw paper by John E. Andrews, and in 1854, in partnership with WS Briggs, improvements such as steam power were introduced. WS Briggs and Sons was formed as a partnership in control of the mills in 1871, with Briggs' son Amos D. Briggs as proprietor. This partnership would buy other local mills as well, including Ephraim Andrews'. An early name for Alcove was Stephensville, named for Archibald Stephens, who at one time owned the Andrews' mill prior to selling it to WS Briggs and Sons. When the post office was established in the hamlet in 1881, it took the name Alcove. The Valley Mill was destroyed by fire in 1892 leaving the 110-foot-tall (34 m) chimney as the only remnant. The chimney is on the National Register of Historic Places and, along with 140 acres (0.57 km^{2}) of the hamlet, is a part of the Alcove Historic District. The district was created in 1980 and has eight contributing properties. The Alcove Preservation Association has been attempting to restore the chimney with hopes of creating a pocket park and interpretive historical center.

The Alcove Reservoir was created (1928–1931) by damming the Hannacrois Creek, which resulted in the flooding and destruction of the nearby hamlet of Indian Fields. The Indian Fields cemetery was relocated to NY 143 at the northern edge of Alcove.

== Geography ==
Alcove is situated along the banks of the Hannacroix Creek east of the Alcove Reservoir. Since the city of Albany does not release water from the reservoir during dry spells, the Hannacroix often goes dry for the first two miles (3 km) downstream from the dam. Coeymans Hollow and the village of Ravena are to the east and Greene County to the south. The hamlet is centered at the crossroads of Albany County Route 111 and Alcove Road and stretches north along the former to New York State Route 143.

== Architecture ==
Several of the older houses in the hamlet are constructed of, or faced with Alcove bluestone. A large smokestack on Albany County Route 111 at the hamlet's border was once part of a large mill which has since been demolished; it is on the National Register of Historic Places. A one-room school house that once served the hamlet still stands, though it has been converted into a private residence.

== Education ==
Alcove is a part of the Ravena-Coeymans-Selkirk Central School District (RCS) and the children attend Pieter B. Coeymans Elementary School for kindergarten through fifth grade, and Ravena-Coeymans-Selkirk High School for sixth through twelfth.

== Transportation ==
New York State Route 143 (NY 143) links Alcove to the other major population centers of the town of Coeymans, including (from west to east) Coeymans Hollow, Aquetuck, Ravena, and Coeymans. NY 143 also connects the hamlet to US Route 9W and the Governor Thomas E. Dewey Thruway (I-87).

== Historic location ==
- Valley Paper Mill Chimney and Site
