= New York State Route 143 =

State highway in Albany County, New York, US

New York State Route 143
- Map of the southern Capital District with NY 143 highlighted in red

Route information
- Maintained by NYSDOT
- Length: 18.82 mi (30.29 km)
- Existed: 1930–present

Major junctions
- West end: NY 85 in Westerlo
- East end: NY 144 in Coeymans

Location
- Country: United States
- State: New York
- Counties: Albany

Highway system
- New York Highways; Interstate; US; State; Reference; Parkways
← NY 142	→ NY 144

New York State Route 143 (NY 143) is a 18.82-mile-long (30.29 km) state highway in Albany County, New York, in the United States. The highway runs from an intersection with NY 85 in the town of Westerlo to a junction with NY 144 in the hamlet of Coeymans. The entire route is two lanes wide. NY 143 follows the path of the Coeymans and Westerlo Plank Road, a plank road that operated from 1850 to the early 20th century. The road became a state highway by 1915 and was designated NY 143 as part of the 1930 renumbering of state highways in New York.

== Route description ==
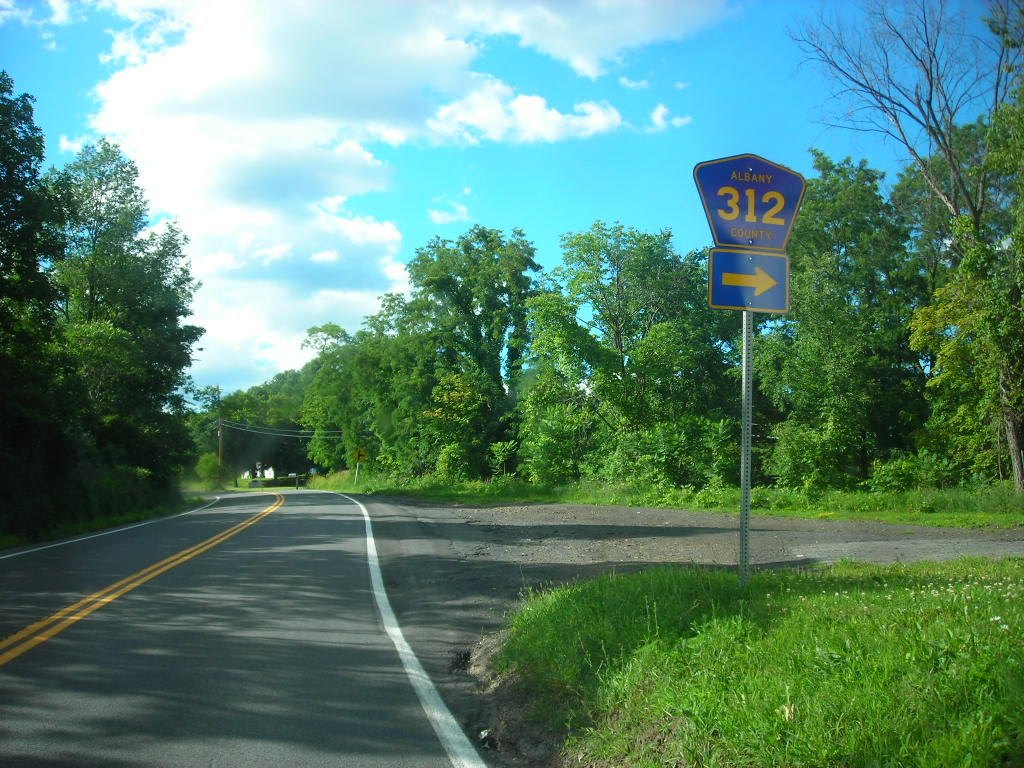
NY 143 west at CR 312 in Dormansville

NY 143 begins at an intersection with NY 85 (Delaware Turnpike) in the town of Westerlo. It proceeds south through the town as a two-lane highway, serving residential areas that become less densely populated as the route heads away from NY 85. The number of homes along the road rises slightly as NY 143 enters the small hamlet of Westerlo, located at the intersection of NY 143 and the eastern terminus of County Route 1 (CR 1, named Switz Kill Road). At CR 1, NY 143 turns eastward to serve Westerlo's central business district. The route passes north of Westerlo Town Park and intersects CR 412 (Airport Road) before leaving the hamlet on a winding, generally easterly alignment.

Continuing through the town of Westerlo, NY 143 passes south of a large airstrip located in a rural area between NY 143 and CR 412. The route remains on an eastward track for another half-mile (0.8 km), meandering through dense woods before turning southeastward into an open area with a handful of isolated homes. NY 143 soon enters the hamlet of Dormansville, where it intersects with the southern terminus of CR 312 and passes some small businesses ahead of a junction with NY 32 just east of the community. NY 143 joins NY 32, forming an overlap that takes both roads eastward toward Alcove Reservoir. The conjoined routes connect two sections of CR 411 and pass over Hannacrois Creek before crossing into the town of Coeymans as Indian Fields Road.

Not far from the town line, NY 143 and NY 32 begin to trend northeastward as they approach and eventually cross the Alcove Reservoir on a narrow causeway. The overlap ends just east of the crossing, with NY 32 bending northward along Indian Fields Road and NY 143 forking to the southeast on an unnamed highway. For the next 2.5 miles (4.0 km), NY 143 runs along the eastern edge of the reservoir, passing by little more than dense forests. The route breaks from the shoreline at the hamlet of Alcove, which comprises several isolated homes connected by a handful of local streets. Here, NY 143 meets the northern terminus of CR 111 as it turns to follow Hannacrois Creek eastward along the base of a narrow, winding valley.

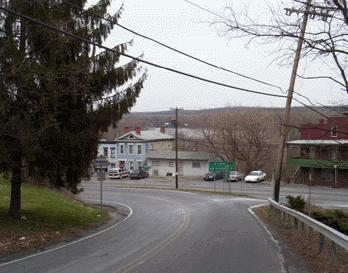
Approaching NY 144, the eastern terminus of NY 143, on NY 143 eastbound in Coeymans

About 1.5 miles (2.4 km) from Alcove, NY 143 reaches the hamlet of Coeymans Hollow, a residential community at the route's junction with CR 103 (Blodgett Hill Road). East of the community, the roadside homes give way to less developed areas of forests and fields as the highway intersects with CR 106 (Tompkins Road) in front of the Sycamore Country Club. The trend soon reverses, however, as NY 143 exits the creek valley and serves another stretch of homes ahead of an intersection with CR 102 (Starr Road). Here, NY 143 turns to the southeast, following Hannacrois Creek to the hamlet of Aquetuck, located about 1 mile (1.6 km) north of the Greene County line. While the creek continues into Greene County, NY 143 curves northeastward toward the nearby village of Ravena as Martins Hill Road.

From Aquetuck, the route crosses a series of hills to reach Ravena, where it meets U.S. Route 9W (US 9W) in the southwestern part of the community. At this point, NY 143 changes names to Main Street as it runs generally east–west through Ravena's commercial center. While traversing the village, NY 143 crosses over a CSX-owned railroad line and passes crosses under the New York State Thruway (Interstate 87). Past the Thruway, the commercial buildings give way to homes as NY 143 transitions from the village of Ravena to the adjacent hamlet of Coeymans. The highway becomes known as Church Street for its final few blocks before descending into the Hudson River valley and ending at an intersection with NY 144 (Main Street) just west of the river. While NY 143 ends here, its right-of-way continues east towards the riverfront as Fourth Street.

== History ==
Most of NY 143 follows the right-of-way of the Coeymans and Westerlo Plank Road, a plank road partially constructed in the early 19th century by the New Baltimore and Rensselaerville Turnpike, which ran from the Greene County town of New Baltimore to Rensselaerville in Albany County. The New Baltimore and Rensselaerville Turnpike Company suffered from financial troubles in the middle of the century, which led the company to sell the road to the Coeymans and Westerlo Plank Road Company, a new company incorporated in 1850. After purchasing the old New Baltimore–Rensselaerville road, the company built a 2.5-mile (4.0 km) spur leading from the original plank road to the hamlet of Coeymans Landing (now Coeymans).

From Coeymans Landing, the newly established Coeymans Landing–Rensselaerville route proceeded generally southwestward through Ravena to Peacock's Corners, where the Coeymans Landing spur met the old road to New Baltimore. Here, the route turned to follow a northwesterly track through southern Albany County to the Delaware Turnpike (now part of NY 85) west of Westerlo. Six toll gates were installed along the route, with the easternmost of the stops positioned midway between Coeymans Landing and Ravena. The other five collection points were placed about 2 miles (3.2 km) apart in Peacock's Corners, Coeymans Hollow, Indian Fields, Dormansville, and Westerlo. While most of the hamlets still exist in some form, Indian Fields was eventually abandoned to create the Alcove Reservoir.

The plank road operated for over 60 years, connecting farmers in Coeymans and Westerlo to the Hudson River at Coeymans Landing. The road was resurfaced with stone in 1860, and the company's 30-year charter was renewed in 1880 for another 30 years. By 1915, ownership of the highway had been transferred to the state of New York. While most of the old plank road was retained as a state highway, the piece west of Westerlo was abandoned by 1926 in favor of a north–south connection between the hamlet and the Delaware Turnpike. The Westerlo–Coeymans state road went unnumbered until the 1930 renumbering of state highways in New York, when it was designated NY 143.

== Major intersections ==
The entire route is in Albany County.

Location	mi	km	Destinations	Notes
Westerlo	0.00	0.00	NY 85 – Rensselaerville, Albany	Western terminus
Westerlo	6.11	9.83	NY 32 south – Cairo	Western terminus of NY 32 concurrency; hamlet of Dormansville
Town of Coeymans	8.42	13.55	NY 32 north – Albany	Eastern terminus of NY 32 concurrency
Ravena	17.44	28.07	US 9W – Albany, Catskill	
Town of Coeymans	18.82	30.29	NY 144 – Albany, New Baltimore	Hamlet of Coeymans; eastern terminus
1.000 mi = 1.609 km; 1.000 km = 0.621 mi: Concurrency terminus
