= Coeymans =

Coeymans may refer to the following in the U.S. state of New York:

- Coeymans, New York, a town in Albany County
  - Coeymans (CDP), New York, a hamlet and CDP in the above town
- Coeymans Creek, a stream in Albany County
- Coeymans School, an historic school building in the above town
- Port of Coeymans, a marine terminal in the above town
