= List of New York State Historic Markers in Albany County, New York =

This is a complete list of New York State Historic Markers in Albany County, New York, at the time it was published.

== Listings county-wide ==
	Marker name	Image	Date designated	Location	City or Town	Marker text
1	Albany City Hall			Eagle St. Between Maiden La. And Pine St.	Albany	City Chartered July 22, 1686 This Building Erected 1882 Tower Contains Municipal Carillon of 60 Bells
2	Birthplace of Modern Electricity		1940	Washington Ave., Near Eagle St.	Albany	Here Discovering Magnetic Induction, Joseph Henry Pioneered the Telegraph and Electric Motor, 1829–31
3	Birthplace of American Union			Plaza, Broadway at Foot of State St.	Albany	Near This Site, Benjamin Franklin Presented the 1St Formal Plan of National Union; Congress of 1754
4	Called Fort Nassau 1614,			Plaza, Broadway at Foot of State St.	Albany	Fort Orange 1624, Beverwyck 1652, Albany 1664; Chartered 1686
5	Clermont			Plaza, Broadway at Foot of State St.	Albany	Near the Foot of Madison Avenue Robert Fulton in Aug. 1807, Completed the First Successful Steamboat Voyage
6	Colonial Hospital			Lodge And Pine Sts.	Albany	Near This Site Stood the Military Hospital Where the Wounded From Ticonderoga, 1758 and Saratoga, 1777 Were Attended.
7	Colonial Warpath			Plaza, Broadway at Foot of State St.	Albany	Rendezvous of Troops in Five Wars. Here Armies Under Abercrombie, Loudoun and Amherst Moved to the Conquest of Canada 1756-60
8	Court of Appeals		1940	Eagle And Pine Sts.	Albany	Highest Tribunal in New York State This Building Erected 1842
9	Court of Appeals			Eagle And Pine Sts.	Albany	Highest Tribunal in New York State This Building Erected 1842
10	Executive Mansion		1940	Eagle And Elm Sts.	Albany	Residence of the Governors of New York State
11	First Church In Albany		1947	Sw Corner N. Pearl And Orange Sts.	Albany	Reformed Organized 1642 Present Building Designed By Philip Hooker Erected 1798
12	Fort Frederick		1940	Capitol Park, Eagle And State Sts.	Albany	In The Middle of This Street To the East Stood Fort Frederick Goal of Burgoyne's Drive to Split the Colonies - 1777
13	Fort Orange			Plaza, Broadway at Foot of State St.	Albany	Site of West India Company Colony 1624. Fort Was Located To The Southeast By the River
14	Fort Van Nassau			Port Rd., Nr. Administration Bldg.	Albany	Built 1614 By the Dutch Explorers Christiaensen and Block. First Trading Center Established in New York State
15	From This Ground			Port Rd., Nr. Administration Bldg.	Albany	Glenn Curtiss Began the First Long Distance Airplane Flight Albany to New York May 29, 1910
16	General John Burgoyne			Plaza, Broadway at Foot of State St.	Albany	Over This Road Entered Albany With His Staff After the Battle of Saratoga Going to Schuyler Mansion As Prisoners of War - 1777
17	General George Washington			Washington Ave. Nr. Swan St.	Albany	Traveled This Road On His Tours of the Mohawk Valley 1782 and 1783
18	Henry Hudson			Plaza, Broadway at Foot of State St.	Albany	Explorer, Here Ended the Voyage of the Half Moon in Quest of the Indies September, 1609
19	Herman Melville		1953	Clinton Sq., N. Pearl And Orange Sts.	Albany	Author of"Moby Dick", Studied and Worked During Formative Years in Albany, 1830–1838, Family Home at 3 Clinton Square, 1834–1838
20	Iroquois Treaty			Plaza, Broadway at Foot of State St.	Albany	August 1684 Basic Peach By Gov. Dongan Gov. Howard of Va. and Five Nations at Court House Which Stood 100 Feet West
21	John Tunnicliff, Jr.			Maiden Lane Between Eagle St. And Lodge St.	Albany	1751–1814 Clockmaker and Superintendent of Town Clocks
22	Near Here		1940	Western Ave., Nr. North Allen St.	Albany	Mohawk and Hudson First Railroad Chartered in This Country 1826, Began Its Run Albany to Schenectady
23	New York State		1940	S. Swan St. And Washington Ave.	Albany	Office Building Cornerstone Laid By Gov. Alfred E. Smith, 1928
24	Patroon Street		1940	Clinton Ave. at N. Pearl St.	Albany	Former Name of Clinton Ave. This Was the Dividing Line Between the City of Albany and the Manor of Rensselaerwyck
25	Pioneer Route			Central Ave., Nr. Northern Blvd.	Albany	at This Point the Pioneers Going West in Ox Carts and Horse Drawn Caravans Assembled, This Street Formerly Called the Bowery
26	Schenectady Gate			Maiden La. Between Eagle And Lodge Sts.	Albany	Near This Point the Path to Schenectady Used By Indians and Fur Traders Led Through the Palisades Which Enclosed the City
27	State Education Building			Washington Ave. Between Hawk And Swan Sts. (missing)	Albany	Dedicated 1912. Education Department Offices; State Library; State Museum; Exhibits; Open to Public
28	The Capitol			Capitol Park, Eagle St. Nr. Washington Ave.	Albany	Of the State of New York Second Capitol Building Erected By the State Cornerstone Laid 1871 25 Years in Construction
29	Schuyler Mansion		1940	Eagle And State Sts.	Albany	[Arrow] ← 1½ Miles Schuyler Mansion Home of General Philip Schuyler. Residence of Alexander Hamilton in 1781
30	Dietz Massacre			NYS 443, .5 Mi. W. of Berne	Berne	5 Miles S - E Site of Dietz Massacre Where Johannes Dietz and His Family Were Killed By Tories and Indians September 1781
31	Ax Factory			NYS 156, at Berne	Berne	Ax Factory Established By Daniel Simmons in 1825. Said to Be the First Factory in the United States to Make Axes From Cast Steel.
32	Beaver Dam			NYS 443, .5 Mi. W. of Berne	Berne	Beaver Dam Later Called Bernville Fortified During the Revolution. John Dietz' Family Massacred By Indians
33	Cheese Factory			NYS 156, at Berne	Berne	Cheese Factory First in Town of Berne Built in 1878 and Made 495 Pounds in A Single Day
34	Corporation Inn			NYS 443, .5 Mi. W. of Berne	Berne	Corporation Inn Opened 1817 By Henry Engle
35	Dwelling			NYS 443, at W. Berne	Berne	Dwelling Built About 1800 By William Shultes
36	Early Settler			Nw Corner NYS 443 And NYS 156 at Berne	Berne	Early Settler Jacob Weidman, A Swiss, Located On Foxenkill On Site of Berne Village About 1750. Built First Sawmill and Gristmill
37	First Mill		1932	NYS 156, at Berne	Berne	First Mill Built 1750 By Jacob Weidman Stood Near Here
38	First Store			NYS 156, at Berne	Berne	First Store Stood On This Site Owned By John Fisher
39	Indian Stockade			NYS 443, 1/4 Mi. East of Berne	Berne	Indian Stockade Built On Site of Berne Village
40	Justice of Peace			NYS 443, at E. Berne	Berne	Justice of Peace Jacob Hochstrasser Was First Supervisor and Justice of Peace of Town of Berne
41	M. E. Church			Town Rd., at Reidsville	Berne	M. E. Church Organized at Reidsville 1830 By Reverend Rosman Kelly Church Replaced in 1841
42	Mill Site			NYS 156, at Berne	Berne	Mill Site For Carding and Fulling Mill Built at An Early Date By Malachi Shipple William H. Ball and Lyman Dwight
43	Pioneer			NYS 156, .5 Mi. N. of Berne	Berne	Pioneer Col. Jesse Wood of Long Island Settled Here About 1800. Served in War of 1812. Died July 23, 1853 at Age of 83 Years
44	Reformed Dutch Church			NYS 443, .5 Mi. W. of Berne	Berne	Reformed Dutch Church Organized 1763, First Pastor Johannes Schuyler 1767. Oldest Church in County Outside of Albany
45	Reformed Dutch Church			NYS 443, at W. Berne	Berne	Reformed Dutch Church Organized 1763 By Rev. Johannes Schuyler of Schoharie Log Church 1765. Frame 1786 Which Was Taken Down 1830
46	Schools			NYS 443, .5 Mi. W. of Berne	Berne	Schools in 1812 There Were 21 School Districts in Town of Berne and 30 the Next Year. in 1816 There Were 1710 Pupils in School
47	South Berne			Co. Rd., at S. Berne	Berne	South Berne Previous to 1828 Called Centerville Because It Was Equi-Distant From Three of the Other Villages.
48	Town of Berne			NYS 443 And NYS 85, at Mallory Corners	Berne	Town of Berne Formed March 17, 1795, From Rensselaerville. Town of Knox Taken off in 1822. Jacob Weidman, First Settler About 1750
49	Weidman Home			NYS 443, at Berne	Berne	Weidman Home the Largest House in Berne With Ten Firplaces Built By Peter Weidman in 1800, Stood On This Site
50	West Berne			NYS 443, at W. Berne	Berne	West Berne Called Mechanicsville 1830-34 Because So Many Mechanics Lived There.
51	Willis' Store			NYS 157, .5 Mi. Ne of E. Berne	Berne	Willis' Store Established in 1800 By Major Stephen Willis Stood Here. He Also Had A Potash Factory, Tannery, Whiskey Still, and Shoe Factory.
52	Agricultural Fair			NYS 32, 100 Yds. W of US 9W	Bethlehem	Agricultural Fair First Annual Fair of Albany County Agricultural Society Held at Bethlehem Center Oct. 4-6, 1853
53	Baker Farm			NYS 144, .5 Mi. N. of Selkirk	Bethlehem	Baker Farm Settled By Joab Baker of Connecticut in 1791
54	Becker Homestead			NYS 396, N. of Rr Bridge	Bethlehem	Becker Homestead at Becker's Corners Settled By Albertus Becker Who Married Helen Van Derzee
55	Bethlehem Center			W Corner, US 9W And NYS 32	Bethlehem	Bethlehem Center Known As Babcock Corners On the Albany and Bethlehem Turnpike
56	Delmar		1932	Delaware Avenue near Adams Street	Delmar	Delmar Earlier Adamsville and Adams Station Nathaniel Adams Located Here in 1836 and Built A Hotel in 1838.
57	Tannery			Willowbrook Ave., In S. Bethlehem	Bethlehem	Tannery Built About 1825 On Farm of Isaac and John Coffin. Operated For Many Years By Robert Carhart. Burned 1883
58	Turnpike			NYS 443, W. of Albany City Line	Bethlehem	Turnpike Albany and Delaware Chartered March 2, 1805. 6000 Shares at $25. Extensively Travelled Albany to Otego. Abandoned 1868
59	Van Wie's Dock	Van Wie Dock Historical Marker, town of Bethlehem NY		Town Rd., at Van Wie's Point	Bethlehem	Van Wie's Dock Site of Dock Owned By Peter G. and Henry Van Wie and Leased Feb. 23, 1835 to Hudson River Steamboat Co. For Albany Terminal
60	Van Wie's House			Town Rd., Nr. Wm. Gibson's Rd. at Van Wie's Point	Bethlehem	Van Wie's House Built By Hendrick Van Wie in 1732. the Home of Six Generations of This Dutch Colonial Family, Settlers at Fort Orange, in 1664
61	Van Wie Point	Van Wie Point Historical Marker, town of Bethlehem NY		Town Rd., at Van Wie's Point	Bethlehem	Van Wie's Point Hendrick Gerritse Van Wie Dutch Colonist in Fort Orange 1664, Built House Here in 1679
62	Winne Farm			Co. Rd., W. of Albany Filtration Plant	Bethlehem	Winne Farm Settled By Francis Winne
63	Coeymans			Church And Westerlo Sts., Coeymans	Coeymans	Coeymans Town Formed March 18, 1791 From Watervliet. A Part Went to Form Westerlo in 1815. Named from the Patentee Barent Pieterson Coeymans
64	Coeymans Gazette			NYS 144, at Coeymans	Coeymans	Coeymans Gazette Started 1863 By Thomas Mckee As Editor. Succeeded By Coeymans Herald
65	Camp Van Schaik			Se Corner Myrtle And Park	Cohoes	Camp Van Schaik Continental Army, Northern Department Under Command General Philip Schuyler General Horatio Gates Aug. 15 - Sept. 8, 1777
66	Continental Ave.			Sw Corner Ontario And Continental	Cohoes	Continental Ave. Algonquin and Mohawk Indian Trail Colonial Military Route
67	Egberts And Bailey Mill			Ontario, W. of Remsen	Cohoes	Egberts and Bailey Mill First Building Erected For the Manufacture of Knit Goods By Power in America, 1836. First Power Knitting Machinery Applied in Cohoes, 1832
68	First Bridge			Mohawk And Remsen Sts.	Cohoes	First Bridge Across Mohawk River Opened 1795. 900 Ft. Long 24 Ft. Wide, 15 Ft. Above Bed of River On 13 Stone Piers. Cost $12,000 Dollars
69	Home of James Buttermilk Lansing			W. Columbia St., Between Sunset And Elaine Cts.	Cohoes	Home of James Buttermilk Lansing Built By Douw Fonda Before 1767. One of the Founders of Boght Settlement, Choes, N.Y.
70	Indian Spring			Continental Ave., E. of School	Cohoes	Indian Spring Algonquin and Mohawk Indians Colonial Military Spring 1690 1782, First Source of Water Supply For the Settlers of Cohoes
71	Juncta			Nw Corner Spring And Saratoga Sts.	Cohoes	Juncta Junction of the Original Erie and Champlain Canals First Settlement and Name Cohoes. Site of the First Post office
72	Manor Avenue			N. Baker And Manor Ave.	Cohoes	Manor Avenue the Old Boght Road Northern Boundary Line of the Manor of Rensselaerwyck June 17, 1904
73	Military Road From 1690			Continental Ave., S. of School	Cohoes	Military Road From 1690 Through the Revolution. Used By General Ebenezer Learned On His Way to Relieve For Stanwix - Aug. 14, 1777
74	Site of Reformed Church			Sw Corner Baker Ave., And Vliet Blvd.	Cohoes	Site of Reformed Church of the Boght One of the First Churches North of Albany, Built About 1783
75	Mastodon			Mohawk And Vliet Sts.	Cohoes	Site of Cohoes Mastodon Found September 1866 Now in N. Y. State Museum
76	Van Schaik Burial Plot			Delaware Ave. Between Ontario And Van Schaick	Cohoes	Van Schaik Burial Plot First Settlers of Cohoes and Owners of Half Moon Patent Buried Here
77	Shakers			NYS 155, W. of Airport	Colonie	1/4 Mile [Arrow] Shakers South Family Only Surviving Family of Watervliet Community First Building Erected 1800 and Still Standing
78	Boght Church			Boght Rd., E. of US 9	Colonie	Boght Church Site of the Reformed Dutch Church of the Boght 1St Church North of Albany Organized By the Classis of Albany, Feb. 22, 1784
79	Louden's Ford			Fonda Rd. at Power Station	Colonie	Louden's Ford British and Continental Army Ford Protected August–September 1777 By Generals Enoch Poor and Benedict Arnold
80	Old Loudon Road			Fonda Rd. at Power Station	Colonie	Old Loudon Road Named After Earl Loudon in 1756. Route of British and American Armies to Montreal
81	Shaker Cemetery			NYS 155, W. of Airport	Colonie	Shaker Cemetery First Burial 1797 and Earlier Burials Removed Here Later
82	Shakers			NYS 155, Nr. Albany Airport	Colonie	Shakers Ann Lee and Company Came to America 1774 and Founded Here in the Valley of the Wilderness the First Shaker Community 1776
83	The Boght			US 9, at Boght Corners	Colonie	The Boght Settled 1718–1750 By Families From the Netherlands, Among Them Fonda, Lansing, Lieverse, Roff, Staats, Van Denbergh, Visscher, Etc.
84	Shakers			NYS 155, W. of Airport	Colonie	[Arrow] Shakers West Family at First Known As the Second Family Occupied By Shakers 1810–1915
85	Shakers			Shaker Rd., Nr. Co. Jail	Colonie	[Arrow] 1/2 Mile Shakers North Family Occupied By Shakers -1919Principal Building Yet Standing Reconstructed
86	Oriskatach	Historical marker for the 1755 Oriskatach house, which quartered soliders duing the French and Indian Wars		Onesquethaw Creek Road	Feura Bush	Gerrit van Zandt house built circa 1755 quartered as many as one hundred soldiers during French and Indian wars
87	Van Dyke House	Historical marker in front of the Van Dyke House in Feura Bush, NY		Tarrytown Road	Feura Bush	Built in 1788, by David Van Dyke a Revolutionary War veteran. The property was once part of the Rensselaerswyck Manor
88	Site of First Reformed Dutch Church			NYS 146, W. of NYS 158	Guilderland	100 Ft. W. Site of First Reformed Dutch Church in Guilderland Before 1767. First Pastor Rev. Harmanus Van Huysen
89	Frederick Crounse			NYS 156, S. of Altamont	Guilderland	About 1750 Frederick Crounse Son of Polish Nobleman Settled Here Farm Owned By Crounse Family to Present 1934
90	Abraham Wemple			US 20, W. of RR Bridge	Guilderland	Abraham Wemple Col. Schenectady Militia During American Revolution Owned Farm Here 1765 to Death in 1799. Buried On High Knoll Above Reservoir
91	Altamont			Main St NYS Rte 146 In Altamont	Guilderland	Altamont Incorporated As A Village 1890 officers: President Hiram Griggs. Trustees - Smith Philley, Jesse Crounse Henry A. Wilbur
92	Battle of Normanskill			NYS 146, 2 Mis. W. of Guilderland	Guilderland	Battle of Normanskill Fought North of the Creek Schenectady Militia With 40 Rhode Island Troops Dispersed Large Group of Tories On August 11, 1777
93	Case Homestead			US 20, E. of Guilderland	Guilderland	Case Homestead Built As Tavern By Russell Case at the Opening of Great Western Turnpike, 1799
94	Dr. F. Crounse			US 20, at Gun Club Rd.	Guilderland	Dr. F. Crounse Built This House 1833 First Physician at West Guilderland (Altamont) Practised Here Sixty Years
95	John Groot			NYS 397, N. of Altamont	Guilderland	Farm and Burial Place John Groot Officer 3D Regiment Albany County Militia War of Revolution
96	Frederick Crounse	Farm of Frederick Crounse Historical Marker near Altamont, NY		NYS 156, 1 Mi. S. of Altamont	Guilderland	Farm of Frederick Crounse Officer 3D Albany Co. Militia in Revolution. Carried Food to Army Battle of Saratoga Buried Here
97	Farm of Evert Bancker			NYS 146, .5 Mi From US 20	Guilderland	Farm of Evert Bancker Third Mayor of Albany, 1695 Indian Commissioner, 1669 Master Chancery, 1705 Died Here, 1734
98	Farm of Walter Vorman			NYS 158, S. of US 20	Guilderland	Farm of Walter Vorman Capt. Schenectady Militia During American Revolution Captured By Tory Force South of Oneida Lake; Held Prisoner in Canada 1780-82
99	First Meeting			NYS 146, 1 Mi. W. of Guilderland Center	Guilderland	First Meeting of Town of Guilderland Held April 5, 1803 in This House, at the Time A Tavern Conducted By Hendrick Apple
100	Freeman House			NYS 146, at Guilderland Center	Guilderland	Freeman House Said to Have Been Erected 1734. Later the Home of Barent Mynderse, Lieut. in War of Rev.
101	French's Mills			NYS 146, at Guilderland Center	Guilderland	French's Mills Site of Early Sawmill; Clothes Works of Peter K. Broek 1795; Factory of Abel French 1800; Tavern of Jacob Aker 1800
102	Glass Works, 1785–1815			US 20, at Guilderland	Guilderland	Glass Works, 1785–1815 Made Bottle and Window Glass. Started Here By Leonard De Neufville. Later Called Albany Glass House, Then Hamilton Glass Works
103	George Wagner House			NYS 397 (Dunnsville RD) and Settles Hill Rd	Guilderland	Home of George Wagner Lieutenant in the American Revolution
104	Henry Rowe Schoolcraft			Rte 20 Near Willow St., In Hamlet of Guilderland	Guilderland	Home of Henry Rowe Schoolcraft B. 1793-D. 1864 Glass Maker, Explorer, Author, Poet, Authority On American Indians
105	House Built 1802			NYS 146, at Guilderland Center	Guilderland	House Built 1802 By Nicholas V. Mynderse Sold to Michael Frederick Who Ran It As A Tavern For Many Years
106	Inn of George Severson	Marker commemorating George Severson's inn, built at the end of the American Revolution		Altamont Blvd. And Helderberg Ave., In Altamont	Guilderland	Inn of George Severson Old Schoharie Road Built at Close of Revolution First Post office of West Guilderland As This Place Was Then Called
107	Inn of Jacob Crounse			NYS 146, E. of Altamont	Guilderland	Inn of Jacob Crounse Built 1833. Midway Tavern Where Horses Were Changed On Schoharie-Albany Stage Coach Route
108	Jacob Van Aernam (1723–1813)	Marker notes where Jacob Van Aernam, a captain in the Albany Regiment during the Revolution, lived		NYS 156 Between Altamont And Voorheesville	Guilderland	Jacob Van Aernam (1723–1813) Capt. 3Rd Albany Regiment Leader of Patriot Forces in the Helderbergh Region During American Revolution Lived On Farm Here
109	Knower House			NYS 146, E. of Altamont	Guilderland	Knower House Est. As Hat Factory About 1800 By Benjamin Knower Gov. William L. Marcy Married Cornelia Knower in This House
110	Old Hellebergh			Main St. And Maple Ave., Altamont	Guilderland	Old Hellebergh Land of Bitter Conflict Between Patriot and Tory Known Later As West Guilderland, Knowersville, and Altamont
111	Old Plank Road			Main St. And Brandle Rd., Altamont	Guilderland	Old Plank Road Schoharie to Albany Followed This Route Chartered 1849 Abandoned 1867
112	First Lutheran Church			NYS 146 and Weaver Rd, 2 Mis. E. of Altamont	Guilderland	On This Spot Stood the First Lutheran Church in Town of Guilderland 1787 Rev. Heinrich Moeller First Regular Pastor
113	Red Men's Hall			US 20, E. of Guilderland	Guilderland	Red Men's Hall Formerly Used As Baptist Church, 1850–66; Catholic Church; Temperance Hall
114	Severson House			NYS 146 at Altamont	Guilderland	Severson House Built By Early Settler Jurrian Severson Located On Map of West Manor Rensselaerwyck, 1767
115	First Inn			US 20 near intersection of Dunnsville Rd	Guilderland	Site of First Inn and Store Kept in Dunnsville By John E. Winne 1800–1830
116	Indian Village			N. of US 20 at Dunnsville	Guilderland	Site of Indian Village Neighboring Stream Called Wildehause Kill Or Indian House Creek
117	Hamilton Union Church			US 20, at Guilderland	Guilderland	Site of Hamilton Union Church Octagonal Building Used Also As A School House Built By Hamilton Mfg. Society About 1797
118	Toll Gate			US 20, 2 Mis. E. of Guilderland	Guilderland	Site of Toll Gate Number Two On Western Turnpike. Road Planked in 1849. This Gate Maintained Until 1906
119	Site of House			US 20 near intersection of Dunnsville Rd	Guilderland	Site of House of Dr. Jonathan Johnson First Physician in Dunnsville Who Came Here On Horseback in 1808 Surgeon in War of 1812
120	The Vale of Tawasentha			NYS 146, 3/4 Mi. W. of Guilderland Near Normans Kill Bridge	Guilderland	The Vale of Tawasentha
121	Town of Guilderland			NYS 146, And NYS 158 at Osborn's Corners	Guilderland	Town of Guilderland Established April 4, 1803 From Part of Watervliet First officers, Supervisor, Nicholas V. Mynderse, Town Clerk, Peter G. Veeder
122	Van Bael Patent	Van Bael Patent Historical Marker, Guilderland, NY		County Route 203, Johnston Road, near 5869 Johnston Road	Guilderland	Van Bael Patent Purchased 1672 from Mohawks. Sold to Symon Veeder 1683 & Omie Lagrange 1686. Disputed by Patroons & reduced to 1000 acres by 1775 arbitration.
123	Albany County			NYS 443, W. of W. Berne at Albany Schoharie Co. Line	Knox	Albany County Derived Its Name From the Scotch Title of the Duke of York and Albany Afterwards King James Ii of England
124	Anti-Rent Riots			NYS 157 A, 3 Mis. N. of East Berne	Knox	Anti-Rent Riots More Leased Land in Berne Than Any Other Town in Albany County Led to Serious Outbreaks After 1840
125	Knoxville Academy			NYS 156, at Knox	Knox	Knoxville Academy Incorporated 1837 Chartered Regents 1842–1869 Faced Military Training Ground 1776
126	Sand Farm			NYS 156, 1 Mi. W. of Knox	Knox	Sand Farm Settled By Christian Zandt in 1787
127	Whipple Farm			NYS 156, W. of Altamont	Knox	Whipple Farm Settled By Malachi Whipple of Conn. About 1793. in 1820 Farm Won Premium As Model Farm in Albany County
128	Clarksville			NYS 443, at Clarksville	New Scotland	Clarksville A Halfway Station Located On Albany and Delaware Turnpike Named From Adam A. Clark Who Settled Here in 1822
129	Early Mission	Early Mission Historical Marker on Rt. 85 in New Scotland NY		NYS 85, at New Scotland	New Scotland	Early Mission Founded 1787 By Suffolk Presbytery Incorporated 1789 First Church 1791 Original Frame Standing
130	Helderbergs	Helderbergs Historic Marker in New Scotland, NY		NYS 157, at J.B. Thacher Park	New Scotland	The Name Means Clear Mountains. They Have Been Called "The Key to the Geology of North America"
131	Indian Ladder	Indian Ladder Historical Marker, Thacher Park, New Scotland NY		NYS 157, at J.B. Thacher Park	New Scotland	In Colonial times an Indian Trail ascended the Helderberg Cliffs at this point from the lowlands to the east.
132	Matthew Bullock	Matthew Bullock historical marker in New Scotland, NY	1932	Bullock Road, 1/2 mile south of New Scotland Road (NYS Route 85)	New Scotland	Introduced English Short Horn cattle into Albany County about 1815 and won premiums at fairs
133	Methodism			NYS 156, W. of Voorheesville	New Scotland	Here Built Its First Church in This Entire Area Known As Bethlehem, North of Black Creek Church, 1823
134	New Scotland			NYS 85, at New Scotland	New Scotland	Town formed April 25, 1832 From Bethlehem. Scotch Names Appear Among Early Settlers. First Town Meeting April 9, 1833
135	Slingerland			NYS 32, 3 Mis. S. of Feura Bush	New Scotland	House 1762 Built By Tunis Cornelise Slingerland, Dutch Emigrant 1650, On Land Purchased From Indians
136	Tory Cave 1777			N. of NYS 157, at Trail, In J.B. Thatcher Park	New Scotland	Jacob Salsbury, A Spy During Burgoyne Invasion, Found Refuge From Settlers in A Cave Against the Cliffs Nearby
137	Albany County			NYS 145, Nw of Preston Hollow at Albany	Rensselaerville	One of the Original Counties of the Province of New York Created By Law November 1, 1683. Mother of Many Counties
138	Albany County			NYS 145 S. of Cooksburg at Albany-Greene Co. Line	Rensselaerville	One of the Original Counties of the Province of New York Created By Law November 1, 1683. Mother of Many Counties
139	Albany County			NYS 145, Nw of Preston Hollow at Albany-Schoharie Co. Line	Rensselaerville	One of the Original Counties of the Province of New York Created By Law November 1, 1683. Mother of Many Counties
140	Manor of Rensselaerswyck			NYS 85, 1.5 Mis. Ne of Rensselaerville	Rensselaerville	Districts Manor of Rensselaerswyck Created A District in 1772 and Subdivided Into East and West Districts in 1779
141	Dr. Samuel Preston			NYS 145, at Preston Hollow	Rensselaerville	Dr. Samuel Preston Settled Here in 1789 and Gave His Name to Preston Hollow. He Built the First Sawmill and Gristmill.
142	Indian Trail			NYS 81 at Cooksburg	Rensselaerville	Indian Trail Ran From Catskill to Schoharie Valley Along This Steam Through Preston Hollow and Livingstonville
143	Joseph Burchard Settled			NYS 145, 1.5 Mis. Nw of Preston Hollow	Rensselaerville	Pioneer Joseph Burchard Settled Here in 1789. President R.B. Hayes Was Related to This Family
144	Turnpike			NYS 81 And 145, at Cooksburg	Rensselaerville	Turnpike Schoharie to Athens Chartered in 1802 and Much Used in Early Days
145	Whipping Post			NYS 145, Nw of Preston Hollow	Rensselaerville	Whipping Post For Town Located On Farm of Lawrence Faulk Who Settled Here in 1790, and Died in 1838
146	Van Der Zee Manor House			Rowe Road, S. of Collabeck Road	Selkirk	Original house built in 1754, by Harmon Van Der Zee, grandson of Storm Bradt who was born at sea in 1636.
147	Academy			NYS 143, N. of Westerlo	Westerlo	Academy This House Was the Chesterville Academy Built About 1800 Gabriel Pinney Head Master
148	Albany County			NYS 32 at Albany-Greene Co. Line	Westerlo	Albany County One of the Original Counties of the Province of New York Created By Law November 1, 1683. Mother of Many Counties
149	Allen House	Allen House Historical Marker, Westerlo NY	1932	Co. Rd.,1 Mi. W. of Basic Creek Reservoir	Westerlo	Allen House Built 1795, Here and On This Road Lived Ebeneazer Allen and His Sons Justice, Howard and Stephen. All Soldiers in Revolution.
150	Anti-Rent War			NYS 85, at Snyder's Corners	Westerlo	Anti-Rent War Events in the Quarrel of Tenants With Lord of the Van Rensselaer Manor Occurred in This Region in 1840 and Later
151	Baptist Church			NYS 143, at Westerlo	Westerlo	Baptist Church Organized at Chesterville 1800. Roswell Beckwith Was the First Pastor
152	Beardsley House			Co. Rd., W. of Westerlo	Westerlo	Beardsley House Home of William Beardsley Here Was Held First Town Meeting of Westerlo April 4, 1815
153	Dormansville			NYS 32 And NYS 143 at Dormansville	Westerlo	Named in Honor of Daniel Dorman, An Inn and Store Keeper, and First Post- Master in 1832
154	Dr. Jonathan Prosser			NYS 32, 1.Mi.S., Dormansville	Westerlo	Early Doctor Dr. Jonathan Prosser of Dutchess County Settled On This Farm in 1788
155	Grant And Eadie			NYS 143, at Westerlo	Westerlo	Grant and Eadie Early Storekeepers Made Potash at Chesterville, 1798
156	Indian Trail			Co. Rd., W. of Westerlo	Westerlo	Indian Trail Old Indian Trail Led Through This Valley to the Switzkill, Indian Camp Ground Near Here
157	Manor of Van Rensselaer			NYS 143, at Westerlo	Westerlo	Manor of Van Rensselaer 1630 Kiliaen Van Rensselaer Granted Patent For 1152 Square Miles Including All of Albany and Rensselaer Counties
158	Myers Farm			Co. Rd., S. of NYS 143, at Westerlo	Westerlo	Philip Myers of Germany in 1763 Built A Log House at Chesterville, Married A Daughter of Nicholas Stoddard and Died 1813
159	Andrew Hannay			NYS 32 And NYS 143 at Dormansville	Westerlo	Near Here Andrew Hannay Raised A Company of Volunteers October 1777 to Oppose Invasion of Burgoyne, Who Surrendered Before Their Arrival
160	Quaker Church			Co. Rd., Nr. Smith's Corners	Westerlo	Quaker Church Site of A Quaker Church and School. Erected 1803 Cemetery in Rear
161	Reformed Church			NYS 143, E. of Westerlo	Westerlo	Reformed Church First Church in Town. Organized 1793. Original Site Five Miles South of Here
162	Snyder Cemetery			Co. Rd., 1.5 Mis. S. of Snyder's Corners	Westerlo	Snyder Cemetery Contains the Unmarked Graves of Several Soldiers of the Revolution
163	South Westerlo			Co. Rd., at S. Westerlo	Westerlo	South Westerlo Name Changed in 1827 From Smith's Mills Named After David Smith Who Also Owned A Tannery and Ashery
164	Temperance Society			NYS 143, at Westerlo	Westerlo	Temperance Society Organized in School House Near Chesterville in 1828 Deacon Holmes Presided
165	Van Leuvan's Corners			Co. Rd.,.5 Mis. S. of Snyder's Corners	Westerlo	Van Leuvan's Corners Named After Isaac Van Leuvan. Earlier Known As Sackett's Corners and Then Preston's Corners
166	Westerlo			NYS 143, at Westerlo	Westerlo	Westerlo Town Formed March 16, 1815 From Coeymans and Rensselaerville. Named For Rev. Eilardus Westerlo of Albany

== See also ==
- List of New York State Historic Markers
- National Register of Historic Places listings in Albany County, New York
- List of National Historic Landmarks in New York
