= Coeymans Hollow, New York =

- Hamlet
- Location within New York Location within the United States
- Coordinates: 42°28′18″N 73°53′40″W
- Country: United States
- State: New York
- County: Albany
- Town: Coeymans
- Elevation: 413 ft (126 m)
- Time zone: UTC-5 (Eastern (EST))
  - Summer (DST): UTC-4 (EDT)
- ZIP code: 12046
- Area codes: 518 & 838
- GNIS feature ID: 947001

Coeymans Hollow is a hamlet in Albany County, New York, United States. The community is located along New York State Route 143 4 miles (6.4 km) west of Ravena. Coeymans Hollow has a post office with ZIP code 12046.
