= Fort Albany =

Fort Albany may refer to:

- Fort Albany First Nation, a Cree First Nation located on James Bay in Ontario, Canada
  - Fort Albany (Ontario), the historical Hudson's Bay Company trading post near the site of which the First Nation was established
- Fort Albany (Arlington, Virginia), a bastioned earthwork built during the American Civil War
- Fort Frederick (Albany), an English fort at the current site of Albany, New York, later known as Fort Albany
