= Walker Creek =

Walker Creek may refer to:

== Falkland Islands ==
- Walker Creek (Falkland Islands), a settlement in the Falkland Islands

== United States ==
- Walker Creek (Apache County, Arizona), a stream in Arizona
- Walker Creek (Marin County, California), a stream in northern California, USA
- Walker Creek (Mono County, California), a stream tributary to Rush Creek
- Walker Creek (Michigan), a stream in Michigan, USA
- Walker Creek (Virginia), a stream in southwestern Virginia, USA
- Walker Creek (West Virginia), a stream in West Virginia, USA
- Floe, West Virginia, also called Walker Creek

See also

- Walker River, a river in Nevada, USA
