= Mull House and Cemetery =

Historic site in Albany County, New York, US

- U.S. National Register of Historic Places
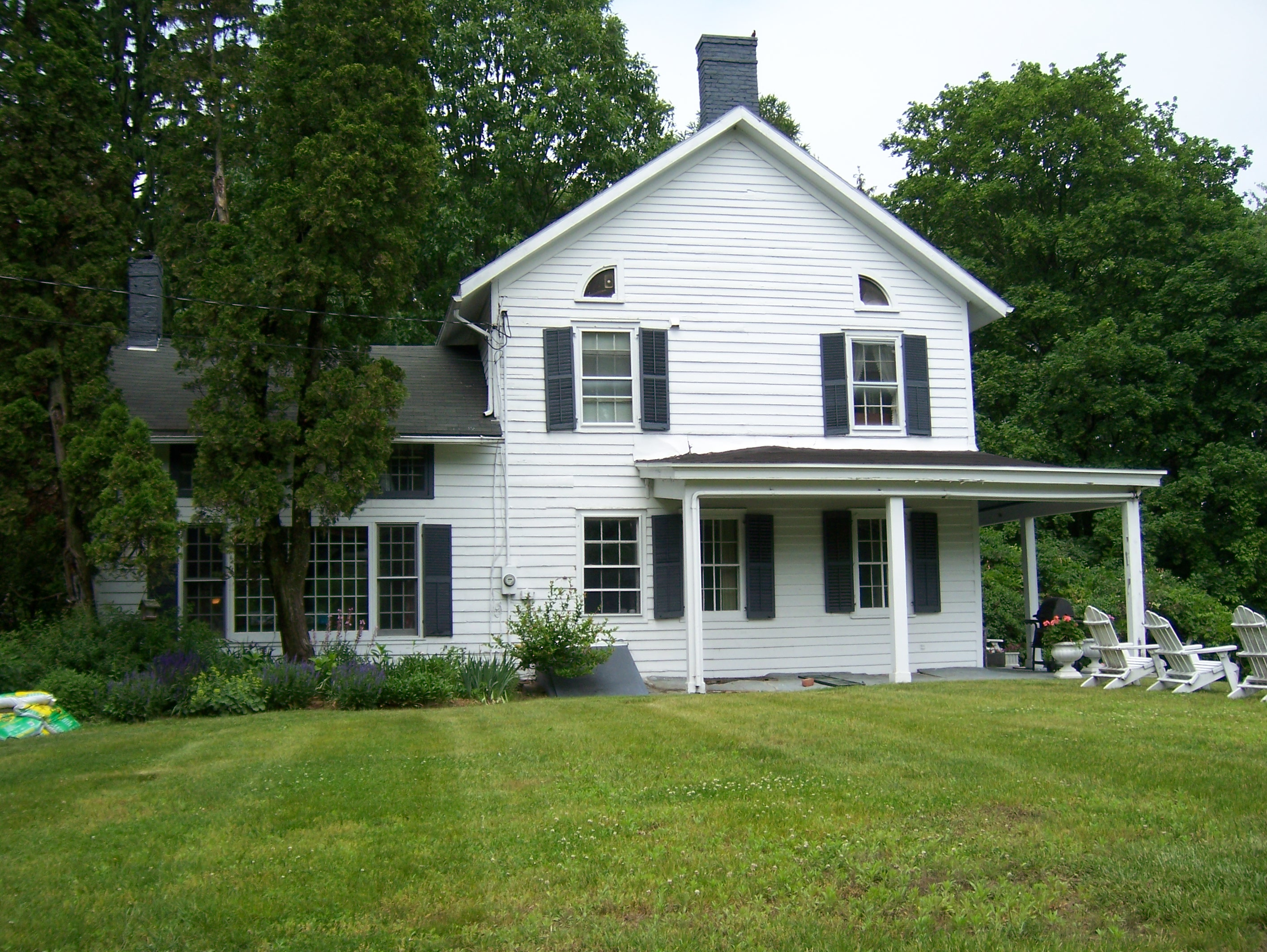
- Mull House built by Barent Mull

- Location within New York Location within the United States
- Nearest city: Coeymans, New York
- Coordinates: 42°30′17″N 73°46′55″W
- Area: 2 acres (0.81 ha)
- Built: 1825
- Architectural style: Federal
- NRHP reference No.: 99000871
- Added to NRHP: July 22, 1999

Mull House and Cemetery is a historic home and cemetery located at Coeymans in Albany County, New York. It was built about 1825 and is a rectangular, 2 1/2-story timber frame dwelling on a stone foundation in the Federal style. It is topped by a gambrel roof. The cemetery includes approximately 12 extant markers. Also on the property is a barn dated to about 1890.

It was listed on the National Register of Historic Places in 1999.

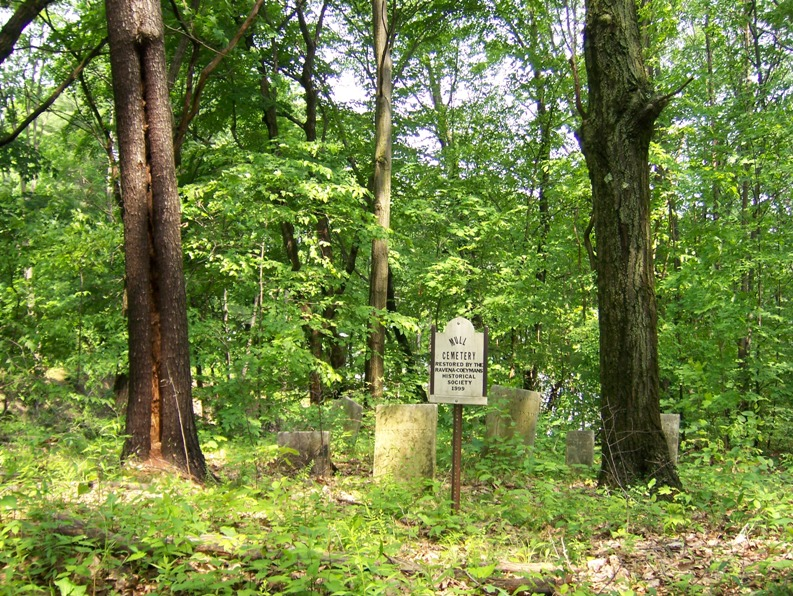
Mull Cemetery
