= Ariaanje Coeymans House =

Historic house in New York, United States

- U.S. National Register of Historic Places
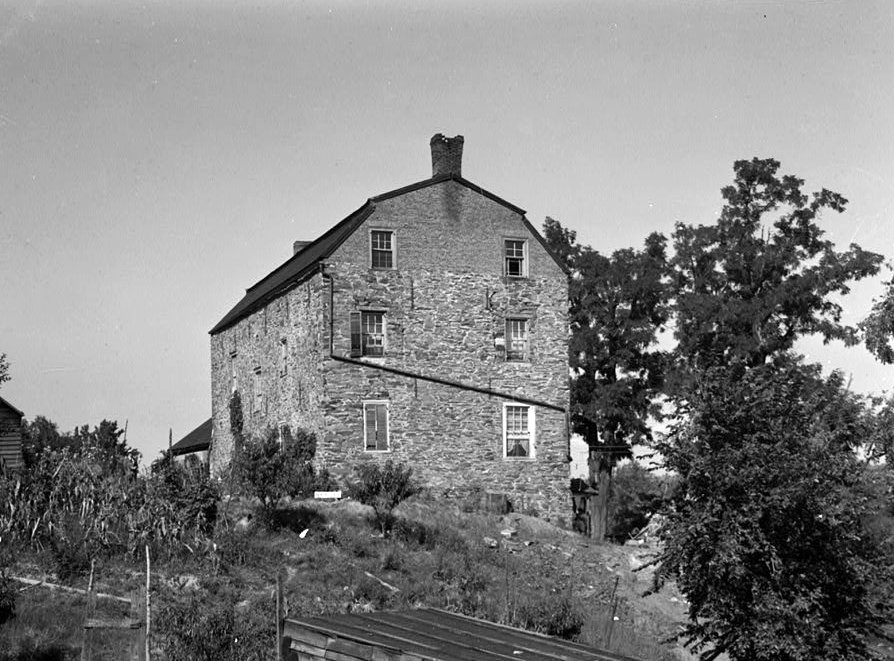
- The Ariaanje Coeymans House in the 1930s

- Location within New York Location within the United States
- Location: Stone House Rd., Coeymans, New York
- Coordinates: 42°28′35″N 73°47′32″W
- Built: 1716
- NRHP reference No.: 72000819
- Added to NRHP: October 18, 1972

Ariaanje Coeymans House is a historic home located at Coeymans in Albany County, New York. It was built in c. 1690 and has a 2- to 3 1/2-story main block with a 1- to 2-story wing. It is constructed of stone and brick and has a gambrel roof. Ariaanje Coeymans (1672–1743) was the heiress of a 17th-century flour and saw milling fortune. Her father, Barent Coeymans, held title to the land patent and died in 1710 intestate. Also on the property are the archaeological remains of mills and outbuildings.

It was listed on the National Register of Historic Places in 1972.
