= Valley Paper Mill Chimney and Site =

- U.S. National Register of Historic Places
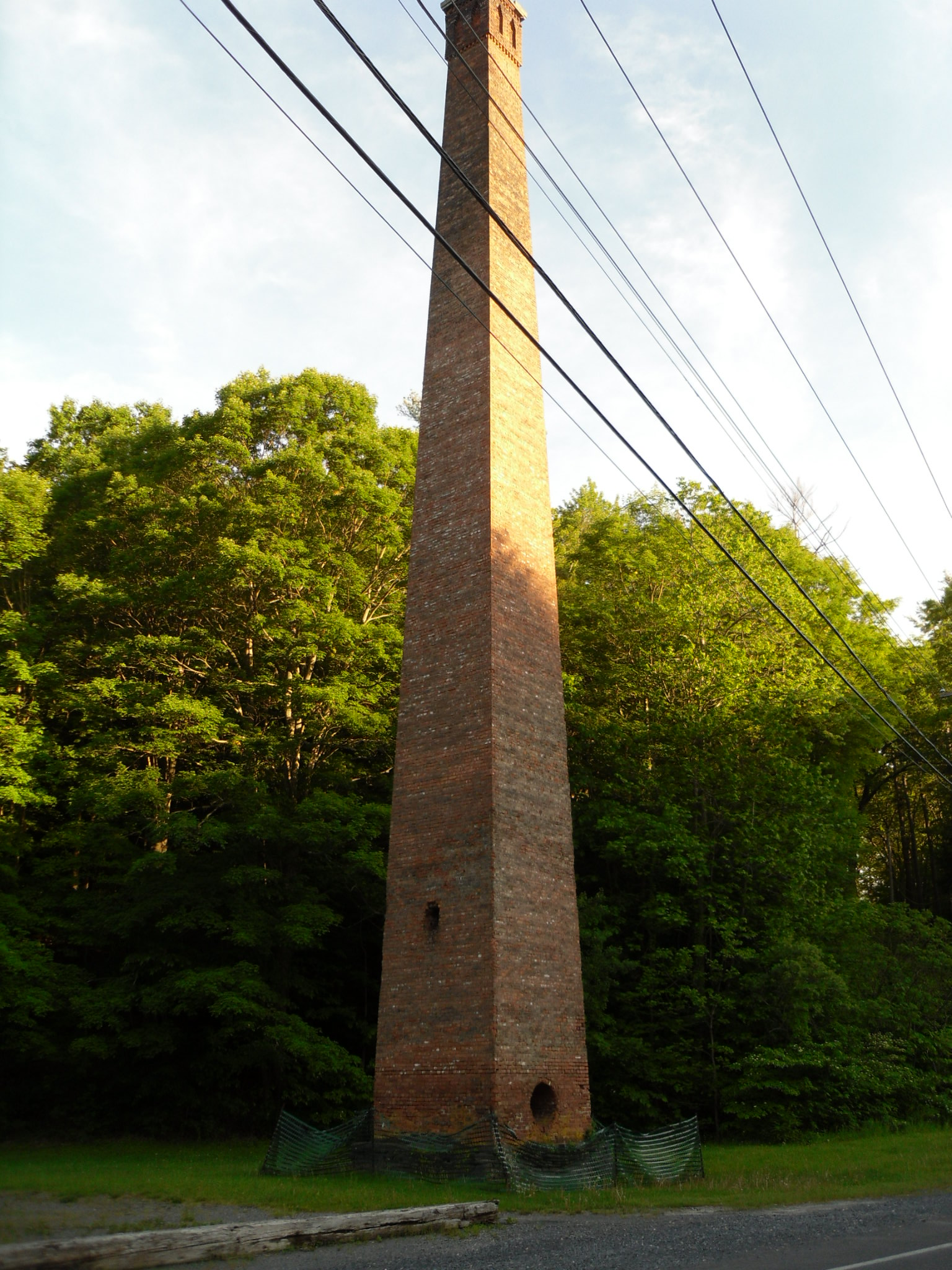
- Valley Paper Mill Chimney, May 2010

- Location within New York Location within the United States
- Location: NY 143 at Cty Rd. 111, Alcove, New York
- Coordinates: 42°28′24″N 73°55′24″W
- Area: less than one acre
- Built: 1844
- NRHP reference No.: 04000350
- Added to NRHP: April 21, 2004

Valley Paper Mill Chimney and Site is a historic chimney and archaeological site located at Alcove in Albany County, New York. It consists of the surviving 1844 Valley Paper Mill chimney and the site of the former straw pulp paper mill. The chimney is a rectangular brick tapered structure measuring 9.5 feet by 9.5 feet at its base and rising 110 feet. The mill was destroyed by fire in 1891 and the site leveled and filled. A significant portion of the site remains undisturbed from the time of the fire.

It was listed on the National Register of Historic Places in 2004.
