= Dormansville, New York =

- Hamlet
- Location within New York Location within the United States
- Coordinates: 42°29′58″N 73°59′40″W
- Country: United States
- State: New York
- County: Albany
- Town: Westerlo
- Elevation: 1,014 ft (309 m)
- Time zone: UTC-5 (Eastern (EST))
  - Summer (DST): UTC-4 (EDT)
- ZIP code: 12055
- Area codes: 518 & 838
- GNIS feature ID: 948588

Dormansville is a hamlet within the town of Westerlo in Albany County, New York, United States. The community is located along New York State Route 143 16 miles (26 km) southwest of Albany. Dormansville used to have a post office with ZIP code 12055.
