= Ravena-Coeymans-Selkirk Central Schools =

School district in the U.S. state of New York

The Ravena-Coeymans-Selkirk Central Schools are located in Albany County, New York. There are four schools in the district: Albertus W. Becker Elementary, Pieter B. Coeymans Elementary, R.C.S. Middle School, and Ravena-Coeymans-Selkirk High School (R.C.S. High School). Albertus W. Becker Elementary is located in Selkirk, Pieter B. Coeymans is located in Coeymans, and R.C.S. Middle School and R.C.S. High School are located in Ravena.

== Places Served ==
Ravena-Coeymans-Selkirk Schools serve the village of Ravena, and the hamlets of Coeymans, Selkirk, South Bethlehem, Feura Bush, Coeymans Hollow, New Baltimore, Alcove, Hannacroix, and a portion of Glenmont. The district encompasses portions of the towns of Bethlehem, Coeymans, New York, and New Scotland in Albany County and New Baltimore in Greene County.
