= Hannacrois Creek =

Hannacrois Creek Hannacroix Creek
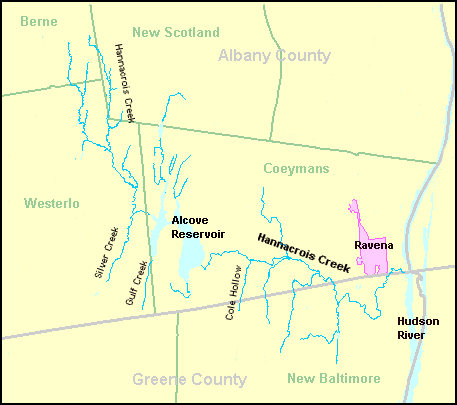
- Map of the Hannacrois Creek

Location
- Country: United States
- State: New York
- County: Albany
- Towns: Westerlo, New York, Coeymans, New York

Physical characteristics
- Source
  - location: Westerlo, New York
  - coordinates: 42°23′58″N 74°00′43″W
- Mouth: Hudson River
  - location: Coeymans, New York
  - coordinates: 42°27′46″N 73°47′06″W
  - elevation: 0 ft (0 m)

Hannacrois Creek is a 20.9-mile-long (33.6 km) tributary to the Hudson River in the U.S. state of New York. From its source in Westerlo it flows through Dunbar Hollows and over Dickinson Falls to the Alcove Reservoir. It then passes through Coeymans Hollow and just into Greene County to its mouth at the Hudson River in Coeymans, New York.

Hannacrois Creek has a drainage area of over 60 square miles (160 km^{2}).

Variant names of the creek include Hannacroix Creek, Haanadrois Creek, and Hannekraai, among others. The name translates to the Dutch "Rooster crowing". There is a story that the early Dutch settlers here saw a rooster come floating down the creek on a block of ice, so the creek became known as the Hannekraai, meaning "cock-crowing" creek. The settlement of Hannacroix also took its name from the creek.

== Tributaries ==
- Silver Creek
- Gulf Creek
- Cole Hollow (stream)
