= Israel Shear House =

Historic house in New York, United States

- U.S. National Register of Historic Places
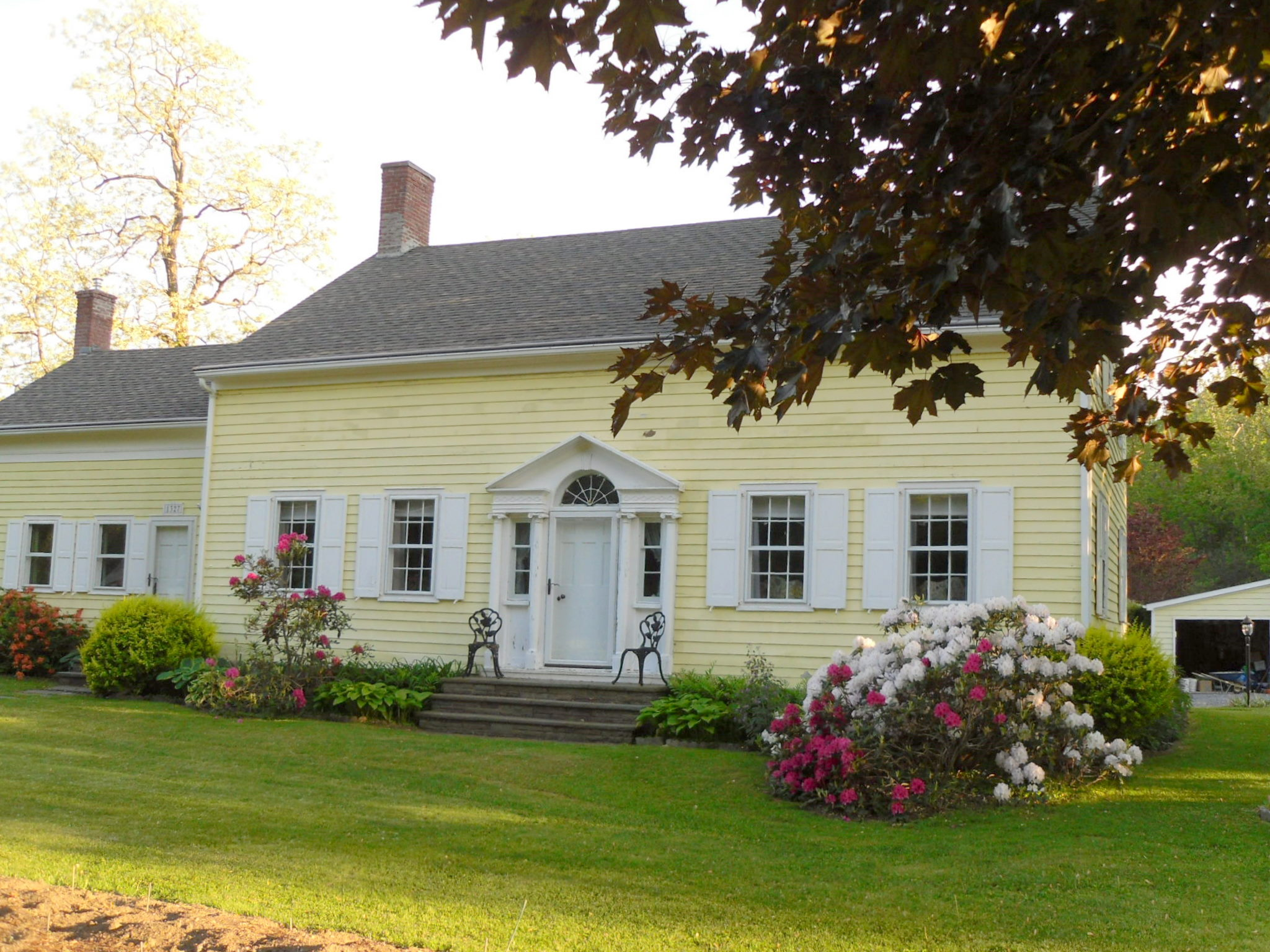
- Israel Shear House, May 2010

- Location within New York Location within the United States
- Nearest city: Ravena, New York
- Coordinates: 42°28′20″N 73°53′56″W
- Area: 1.3 acres (0.53 ha)
- Built: 1810
- Architectural style: Federal
- NRHP reference No.: 96001436
- Added to NRHP: December 6, 1996

Israel Shear House is a historic home located at Ravena in Albany County, New York. It was built about 1810 and is a 1 1/2-story, rectangular heavy timber-frame dwelling on a rubble foundation. It is in the Federal style. The center entrance features a broad nine-panel door framed by Corinthian columns and side lights.

It was listed on the National Register of Historic Places in 1996.
