= Coeymans-Bronck Stone House =

Historic house in New York, United States

- U.S. National Register of Historic Places
- Location within New York Location within the United States
- Location: NY 144, Coeymans, New York
- Coordinates: 42°27′59″N 73°47′30″W
- Area: 4.7 acres (1.9 ha)
- Built: 1769
- Architectural style: Colonial, Georgian
- NRHP reference No.: 03001148
- Added to NRHP: November 15, 2003

Coeymans-Bronck Stone House is a historic home located at Coeymans in Albany County, New York. It was built in 1769 and is a 1 1/2-story, rectangular, rubblestone dwelling topped by a gambrel roof. A modern 1 1/2-story wing is attached to the south elevation. The entry features a broad, finely paneled Georgian-style split (or Dutch) door.

It was listed on the National Register of Historic Places in 2003.
