= Hogansaani Spring =

Spring in Apache County, Arizona

Coordinates: 36°51′16″N 109°31′18″W

Hogansaani Spring is a spring on Walker Creek in Apache County, Arizona. It is located on the south side of Walker Creek, at an elevation of 5,102 feet (1,555 meters). The Apache word Hogansaani means "the lone hogan" or "at the hogan"; thus, the name means "the spring at the hogan".
