= Powell & Minnock Brick Company =

American company

The Powell & Minnock Brick Company was founded in the late 1880s by members of the Powell and Minnock Families. The company closed down in 2001. In 2006, the company's Coeymans, New York site was used for assembly of the 145th Street Bridge's new swing span.

The company's site is located to the immediate south of the Lafarge cement plant, which acquired some of P&M's land, probably during its construction in the 1960s.

== History ==
In 1963 Powell and Minnock acquired and transferred its operations to the old Sutton and Suderly yard, which had closed after nearly 80 years in Coeymans. In the late 60s, Powell & Minnock assumed the contract for supplying brick for Co-op City, Bronx. They were the sole supplier, furnishing a 3 1/2 inches high by 8 inches long "Econo" brick. This was a brick size well outside of any previous Hudson River brickmaking experience. The Econo brick also was a brown brick that had a manganese additive for coloring.

By the mid-1970s, the Hudson River brick industry was reduced to 2 plants: Powell and Minnock and the former Sutton and Sutterly Brick and Roah Nook Brick Companies. The last major investment at Powell & Minnock was a new molded-brick plant, built in 1989. At the time, Powell & Minnock was owned by General Dynamics, the diversified industrial giant known for its manufacture of tanks and submarines.

In 2000 an award from NY State of more than $4,000 went to Powell and Minnock to fund an efficiency study of the facility. Annual energy bills exceeded $1.6 million. The study recommended a number of ways the company could lower its energy costs, including lighting upgrades and retrofits, installing more efficient electric motors, and modifying the kilns used to manufacture the bricks, which would allow 63% more bricks to be processed through the kilns each day. These recommendations could save Powell and Minnock about $640,000 per year. The total cost to implement these recommendations will be a little more than $1 million, which will be covered by the energy savings in less than two years.

== Conversion ==
In 2001 Cockrell and other managers tried to save the company which was then owned by Isiklar Holding of Istanbul, Turkey with a buy-out plan. The plan failed. Powell and Minnock was the last brick manufacturer in New York. The property was purchased by P&M Brick LLC. When it became clear that the capital investment necessary to make the plant viable again proved too high, the vision of a marine terminal was conceived. Today, the Port of Coeymans Marine Terminal is a rapidly growing, privately owned, full service marine terminal and port.

== Environmental Impact ==
The brick yards left a lasting impact on the scape of the river nearby. At the peak of its operation, it was standard practice to dump piles of unusable brick on the shores of the river. On the beaches to the north of the factory, brick is a common sight. Much of the shoreline consists of brick dumping, which has begun falling into the river due to settling of the brick and erosion. Housing formerly used by brickyard workers can still be seen in some areas, along with deposits of bottles left as waste.
