= Fletcher Blaisdell Farm Complex =

Historic house in New York, United States

- U.S. National Register of Historic Places
- Location within New York Location within the United States
- Location: Westerlo St., Coeymans, New York
- Coordinates: 42°28′20″N 73°48′0″W
- Area: 8 acres (3.2 ha)
- Built: 1837
- Architectural style: Greek Revival
- NRHP reference No.: 01000246
- Added to NRHP: March 12, 2001

Fletcher Blaisdell Farm Complex is a historic farm complex located at Coeymans in Albany County, New York. The complex includes the farmhouse (1837), hay barn (1878), corn crib (c. 1870), smoke house (c. 1840), tenant house (c. 1830), small barn (c. 1870), and shed / chicken coops (c. 1870). The farmhouse is a 2 1/2-story, three-by-three-bay, gable-fronted, side hall plan Greek Revival–style dwelling with south and east wings added.

It was listed on the National Register of Historic Places in 2001.
