= Cornelius and Agnietje Van Derzee House =

Historic house in New York, United States

- U.S. National Register of Historic Places
- Location within New York Location within the United States
- Location: Van Derzee Rd., Coeymans, New York
- Coordinates: 42°27′18″N 73°51′49″W
- Area: 260 acres (110 ha)
- Built: 1765
- Architectural style: Greek Revival, Georgian
- NRHP reference No.: 05000259
- Added to NRHP: April 6, 2005

Cornelius and Agnietje Van Derzee House is a historic home and farm complex located at Coeymans in Albany County, New York. It was built about 1765 and is a rectangular two-story rubblestone dwelling with brick gables. The front facade is five bays with a Greek Revival style central entrance. A craftsman inspired porch was added in 1915. A two-story gable roof wing was added to the south elevation about 1890 and a large, two-story Greek Revival era wing is on the west. It has a moderately pitched gable roof. Also on the property are eleven contributing outbuildings and the agricultural setting. They include a tenant house (ca. 1840), large upper barn (1870), hog barn and chicken coop (1813), barn (1825), wagon house (1868), cow barn (1883), wood shop (ca. 1870), corn crib (ca. 1870), fruit barn (1911), paint house (ca. 1880), garage (1890), and brooder house (ca. 1932).

It was listed on the National Register of Historic Places in 2005.
