= Ravena-Coeymans-Selkirk High School =

Coordinates: 42.498012°N 73.822943°W

- 2025 Route 9W, Ravena, New York 12143

Information
- Type: Rural-suburb public high school
- School district: Ravena-Coeymans-Selkirk Central Schools
- Superintendent: Brian Bailey
- Principal: Ryan Funck
- Grades: 9-12
- Enrollment: 518 (2023-24)
- Colors: Green and Gold
- Athletics: Football, soccer, wrestling, swimming, track, cross country, softball, baseball, golf, bowling, basketball, volleyball
- Athletics conference: Colonial Council
- Mascot: Raven
- Nickname: The Ravens
- Accreditation: Middle States Association of Colleges and Schools
- Nicknames: "Ravena-Coeymans-Selkirk High School", "RCS"
- Website: https://www.rcscsd.org/o/rcs-high

Ravena-Coeymans-Selkirk High School (technically Ravena-Coeymans-Selkirk Senior High School) is a small high school in Ravena, New York, about 9 miles south of Albany, New York on U.S. Route 9W.

It is known for its football and wrestling. They also have some individual state champions in track and field.

RCS has numerous clubs, including art, drama club, French, FBLA, key club, S.A.D.D, G.S.A, Gaming club and a Robotics club which is for the schools FIRST Tech Challenge Team. The "Ravena Rattlesnakes"

The football team has won the sectional and regional championships in 1996, 1997, 1998, 2004, 2021, 2022, and 2023. In 1996, the team made a trip to the state championship in the Carrier Dome at Syracuse University.

== Notable alumni ==
- Thomasina Winslow

== See also ==
- Coeymans, New York
- Selkirk, New York
