= Alcove Historic District =

- U.S. National Register of Historic Places
- U.S. Historic district
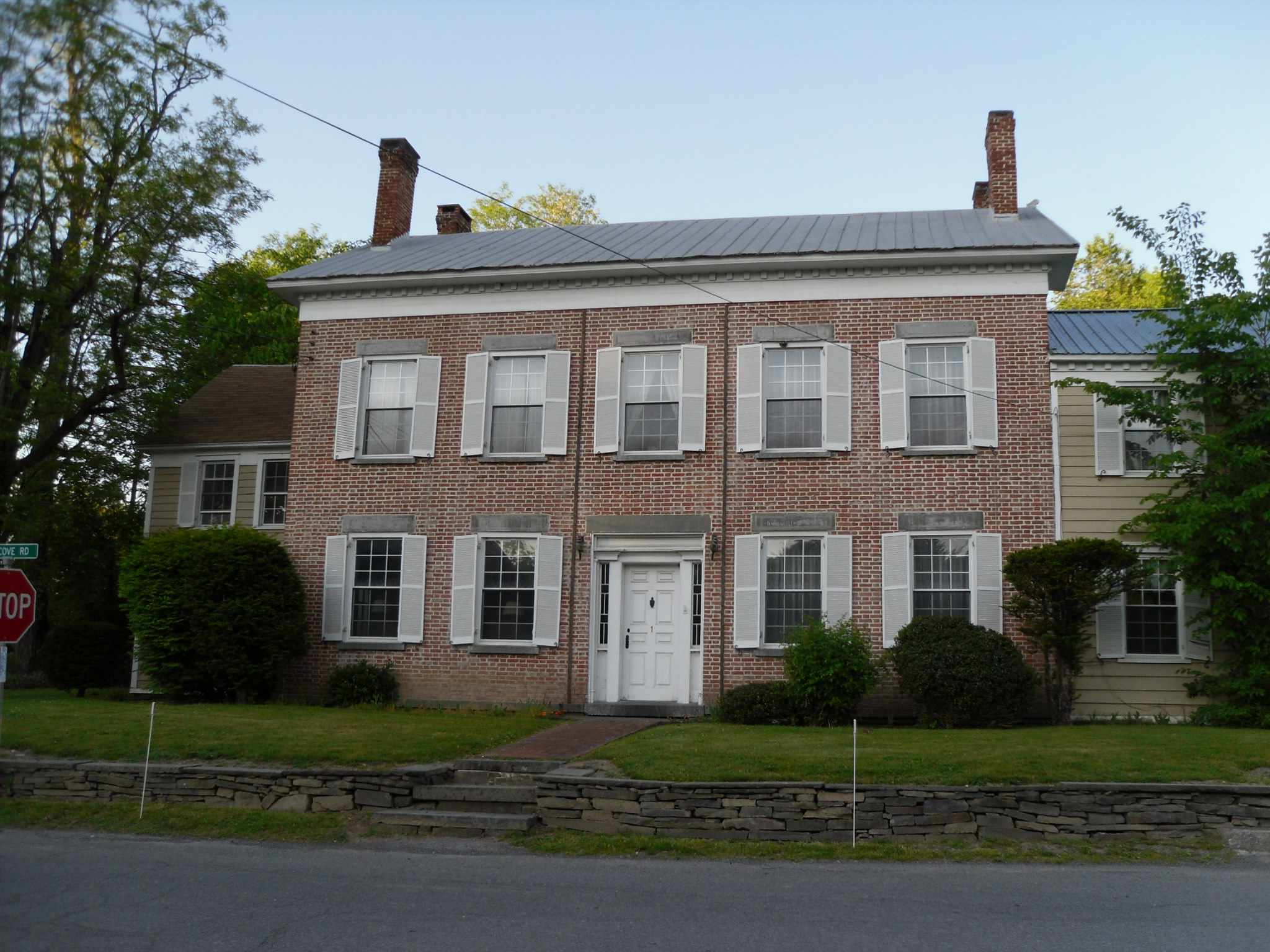
- Briggs House, May 2010

- Location within New York Location within the United States
- Location: SR 11 and Alcove Rd., Alcove, New York
- Coordinates: 42°28′10″N 73°55′36″W
- Area: 14 acres (5.7 ha)
- NRHP reference No.: 80002582
- Added to NRHP: July 24, 1980

Alcove Historic District is a 14-acre (5.7 ha) historic district in the hamlet of Alcove in Albany County, New York. It was listed on the National Register of Historic Places in 1980. In 1980, it included eight contributing buildings.

The area defined in the historic district is a 14-acre (57,000 m^{2}) area.
