= Van Dyke House =

- U.S. National Register of Historic Places
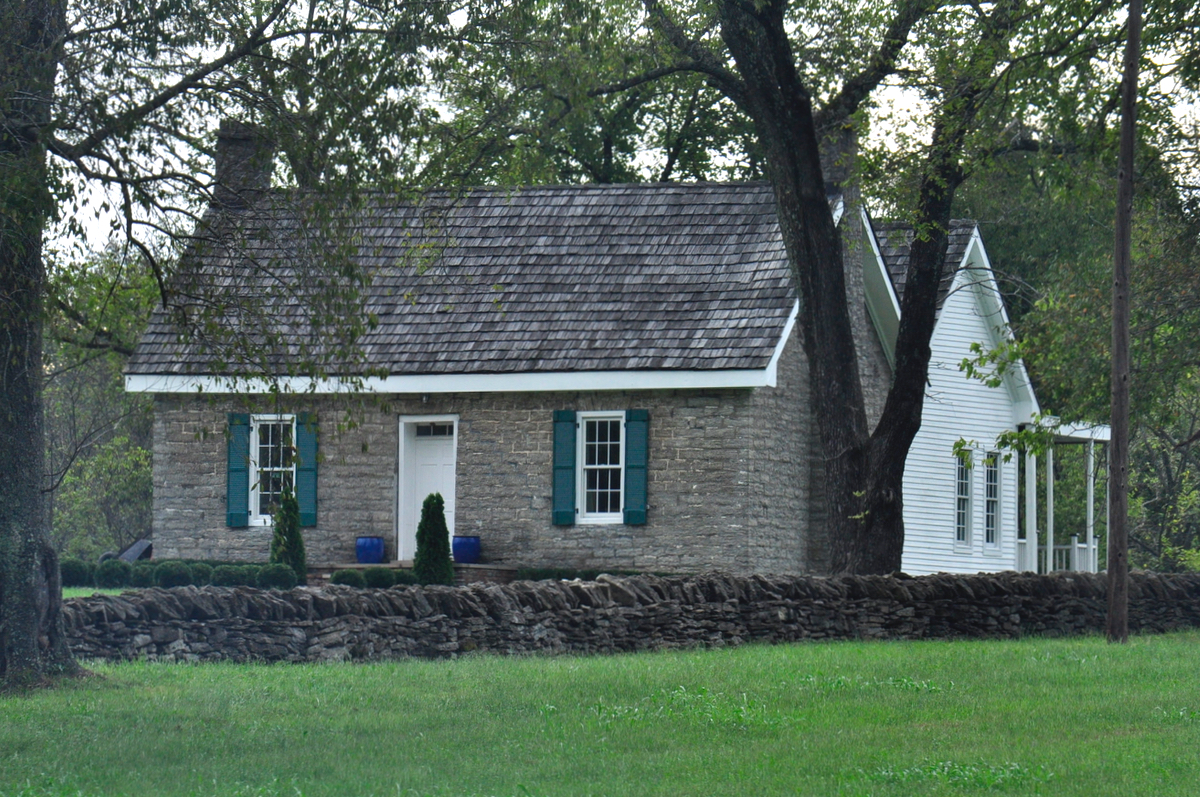
- Van Dyke House in Rivals, Kentucky

- Location within Kentucky Location within the United States
- Location: Buck Henry Foster Lane, near Rivals, Kentucky
- Coordinates: 38°06′11″N 85°18′02″W
- Area: 50 acres (20 ha)
- Architectural style: Federal
- MPS: Early Stone Buildings of Kentucky Outer Bluegrass and Pennyrile TR
- NRHP reference No.: 87000181
- Added to NRHP: January 8, 1987

The Van Dyke House near Rivals, Kentucky was listed on the National Register of Historic Places in 1987. The county that surrounds the Van Dyke House is Spencer County.

It is a one-and-a-half-story, three-bay, dry-stone hall-parlor plan house, 24 by 35 feet (7.3 m × 10.7 m) in plan. It was built of Upper Ordovician limestone.

In the 1990s, the house was surrounded by grasslands, hundreds of trees, and a shed on the side for storage. Currently, the house is modernized and suburban-like, fitting well into the community.

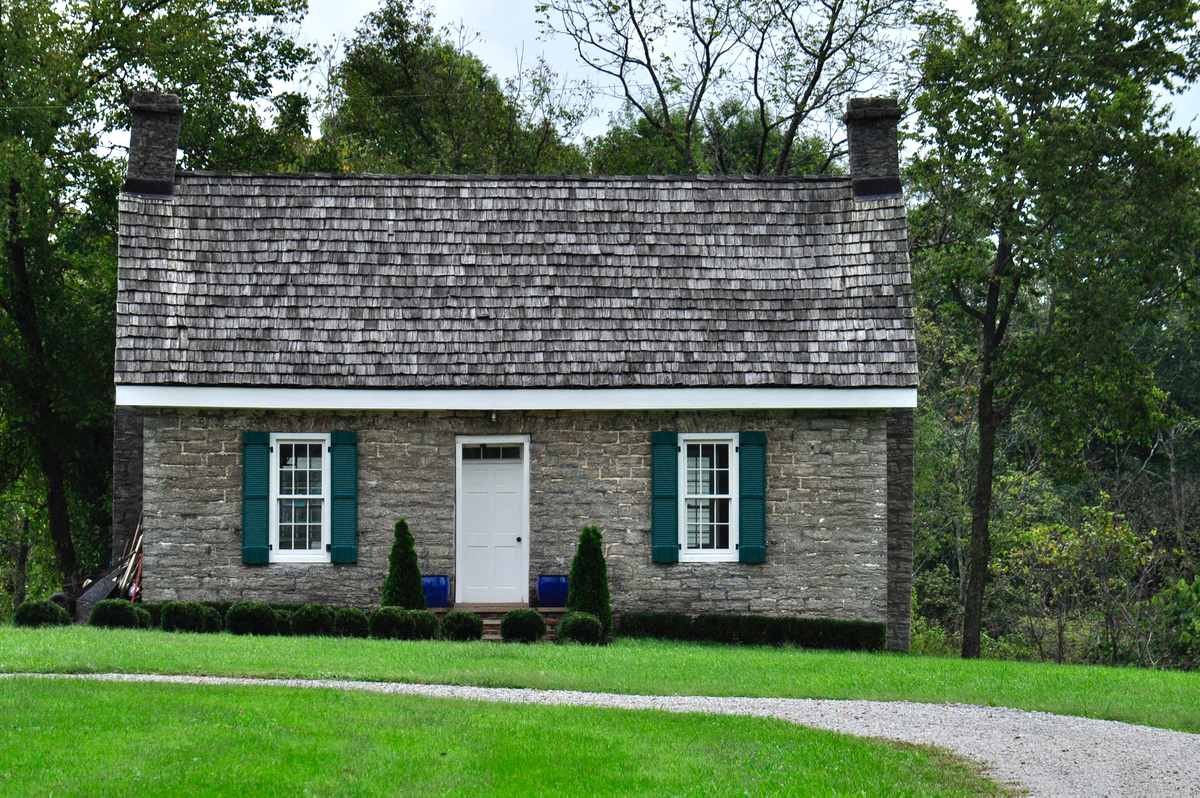

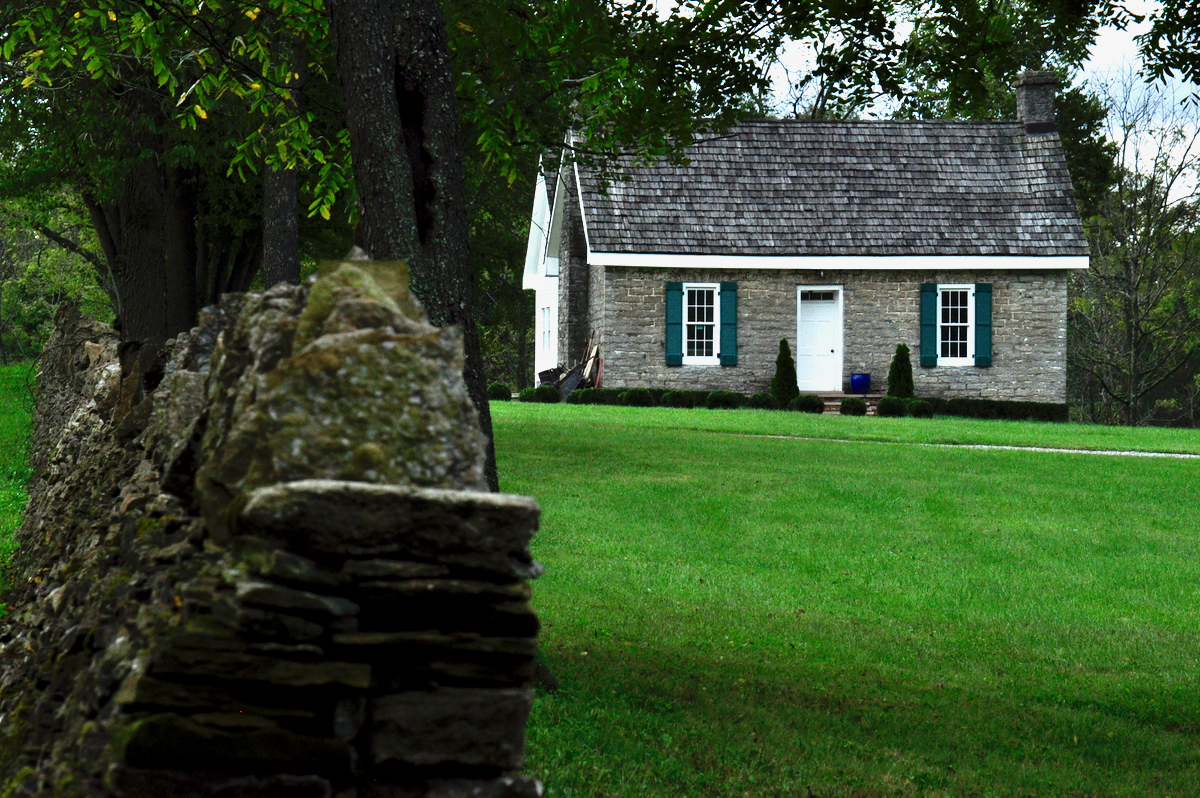

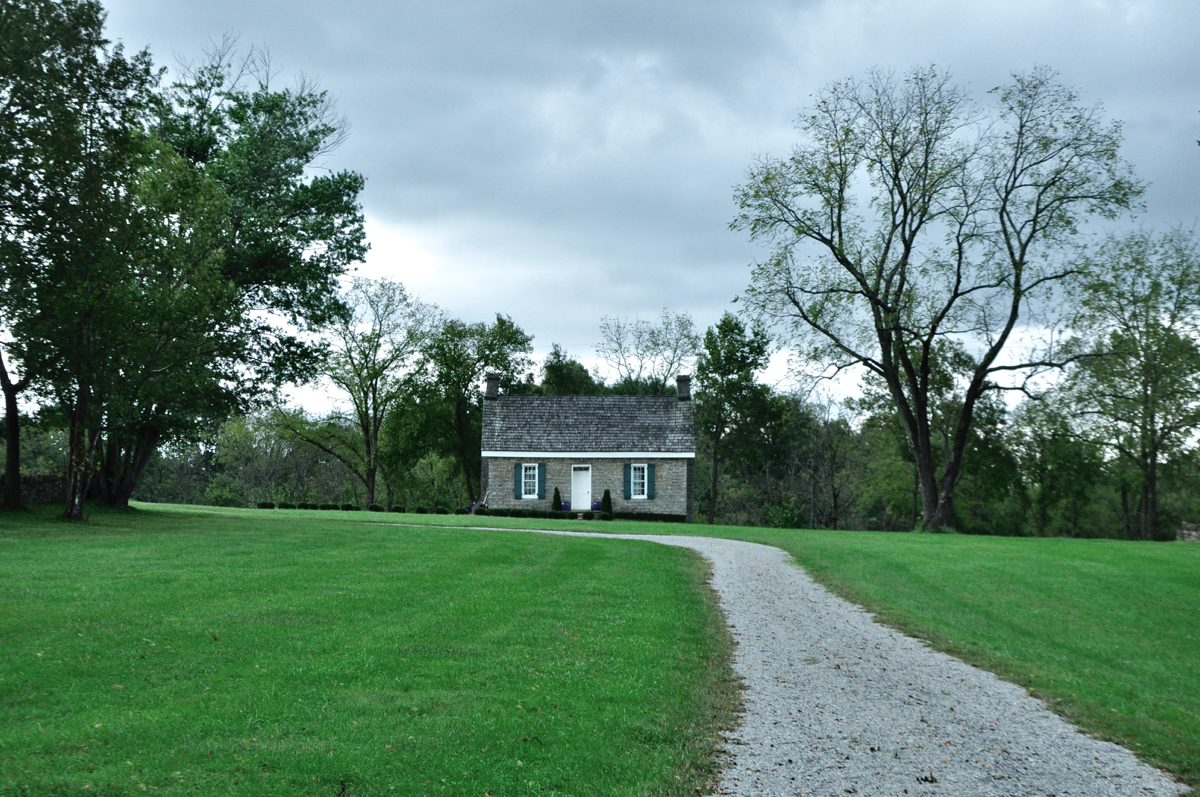
