= Fort Frederick (Albany) =

English fort at the current site of Albany, New York, later known as Fort Albany

- Albany, New York
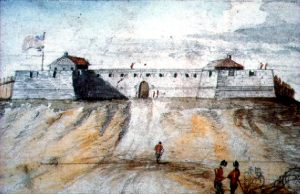
- Fort Frederick in the 1700s as drawn by James Eights in the mid-1800s.

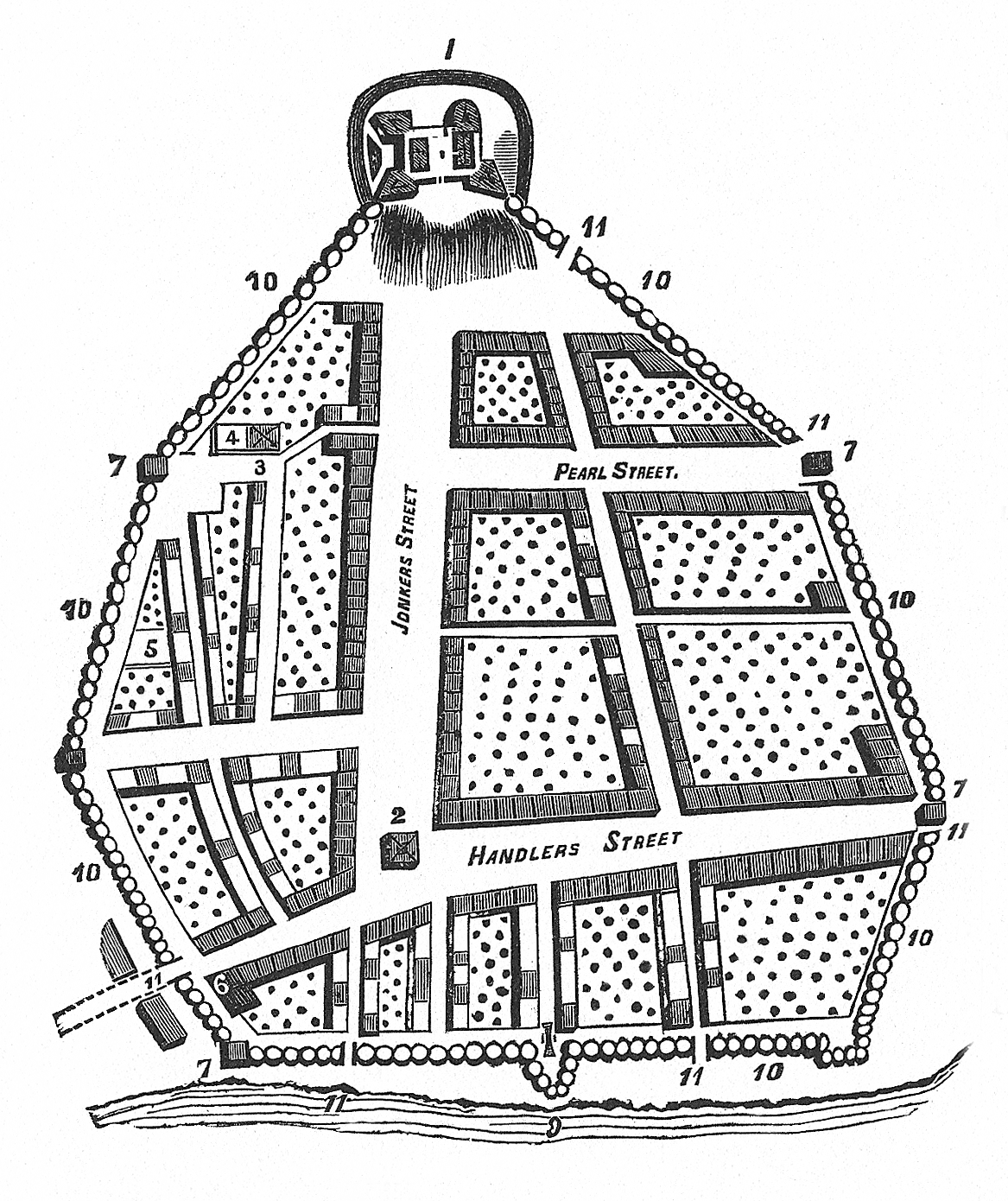
- Map of Albany showing the stockade in 1695. North is to right, fort at top.

Site information
- Type: Fort

Location
- Coordinates: 42.65069°N 73.7545°W

Site history
- Built: 1676
- Materials: Wooden stockade in 1676, masonry in 1703
- Demolished: 1790

Garrison information
- Garrison: English army (after 1707 British)

Fort Frederick was a fort in Albany, New York from 1676–1789. Sitting atop State Street Hill (Capitol Hill) it replaced the earlier decaying Fort Orange along the Hudson River. The fort was named for Frederick Louis, Prince of Wales, son of King George II. The fort was referred to as Fort Albany in the 1936 novel Drums Along the Mohawk. Several historical markers have been placed west of the location of the fort.

== History ==
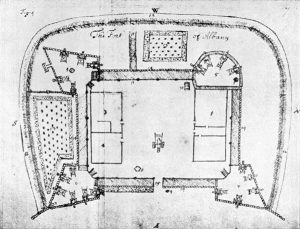
Fort Frederick in 1695

After the English takeover of New Netherland, including Beverwyck which became Albany, the Duke of York and of Albany (later James II & VII) required a permanent garrison to keep the peace in Albany; therefore Fort Frederick was built atop State Street Hill in 1676 to replace Fort Orange and guard the approaches to Albany from the west. Whereas Fort Orange was constructed more as a trading post along the Hudson River this new fort was designed to protect Albany from the Native Americans to the west and by overlooking the riverside community from atop a steep hill it was a constant reminder of English rule over the dominant Dutch population. The fort was located at the intersection of Lodge and State streets, construction began in March and concluded in June. Originally a wooden stockade, it consisted of two small buildings surrounded by a stockade, Ensign Silvester Salisbury was the first commander of the fort. The fort became property of the English Crown when the Duke of York and of Albany became King James II & VII.

As the frontier pushed west and north away from Albany the fortifications at Albany became less important as a defense against attack. It was rebuilt as a masonry fortification 1702–35, as part of a general province-wide upgrade to forts, with 21-guns and a stockade that surrounded the entire village. During the Seven Years' War (often referred to as the French and Indian Wars in the United States) the fort saw its largest contingent of British soldiers, with additional barracks, magazines, storehouses, and a hospital being built. After the war, the fort fell into disrepair and during the 1760s the residents of Albany began to salvage stone, wood, and other construction material from the fort for their own uses. In 1765 the barracks, hospital, and fort were purchased by the city from the provincial government which had already by that time abandoned it.

During the American Revolution what remained of the fortifications was used as a jail to house those loyal to the British. After the war the fort became an obstacle to the development of the city to the west up the hillside. The fort was dismantled in 1789 and the land deeded to St. Peter's Episcopal Church. Eventually the current St. Peter's Church bell tower would be built on the site of the northeastern bastion of the fort.

== Historical markers ==
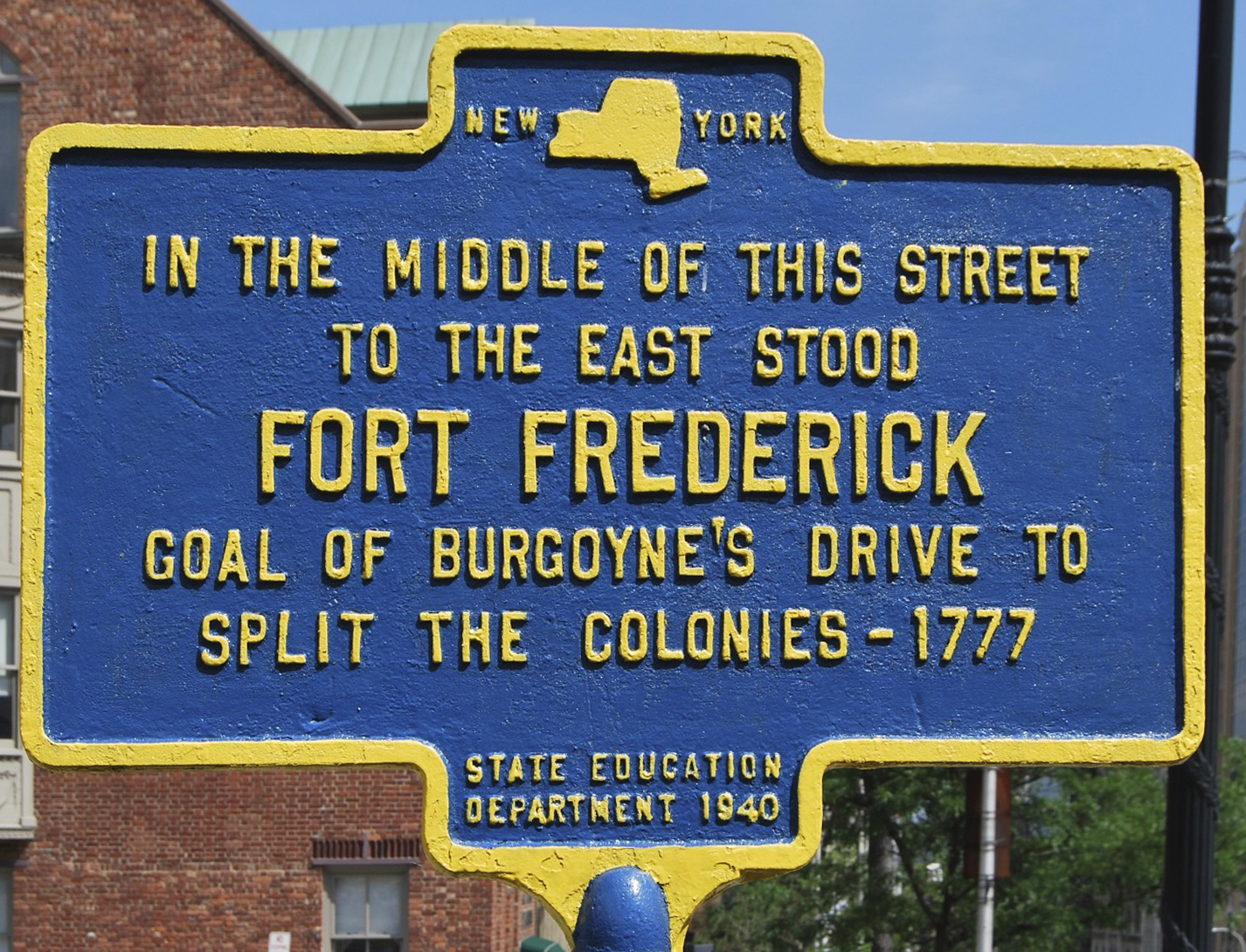
Historic marker on State Street

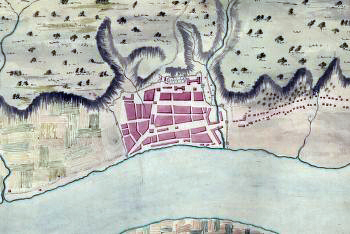
Map of Albany in 1758. North to right. This same map appears on a commemorative marker on State Street.

As part of the Albany city bi-centennial celebrations a commemorative plaque was placed on the west side of the intersection of State and Eagle streets between the curb stones and the sidewalk in front of the New York State Capitol building. In 1940 the New York State Education Department placed a state historical marker commemorating the fort as the "Goal of Burgoyne's Drive to Split the Colonies – 1777". This marker is also in front of the Capitol building. Another marker for Fort Frederick sits across the street from the other two. This marker is in a median in the middle of State Street at the base of a pole mounted clock. This marker shows the portrait of Fort Frederick by James Eights and a map of the stockaded Albany community.

Preceded by Fort Orange; 1623–1676	Forts of Albany, New York; Fort Frederick; 1676–1789	Succeeded by None
