= Coeymans School =

- U.S. National Register of Historic Places
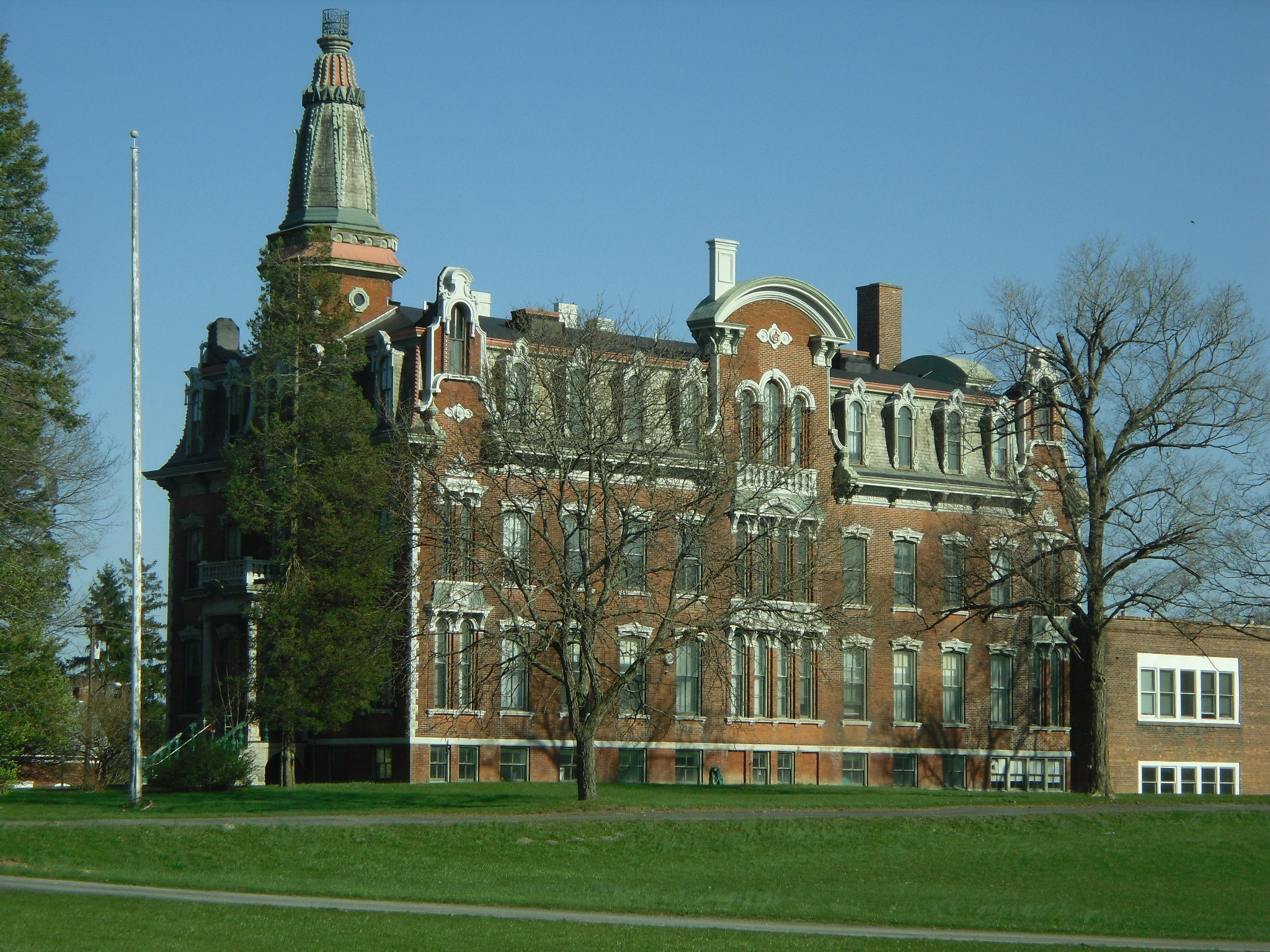
- Coeymans School, April 2010

- Location within New York Location within the United States
- Location: SW corner of Westerlo St. and Civill Ave., Coeymans, New York
- Coordinates: 42°28′23″N 73°47′54″W
- Area: 0 acres (0 ha)
- Built: 1873
- NRHP reference No.: 70000418
- Added to NRHP: December 29, 1970

Coeymans School, also known as Acton Civill Polytechnic Institute, is a historic school building located at Coeymans in Albany County, New York. It was built in 1874 and is a rectangular brick building with a mansard roof with slate shingles. It is three stories tall, five bays wide and eleven bays deep. It features an unusual number of cast iron architectural details including the water table, quoins, window labels, balustrade, towers, and chimney. The building was originally built by Acton Civill (1804-1889) to house a polytechnic institute. In 1899, the local board of education purchased the building and used it for instructional purposes until 1963.

It was listed on the National Register of Historic Places in 1970.
