= Port of Coeymans =

Port of Coeymans P&M Marine Terminal
- Interactive map of Port of Coeymans; P&M Marine Terminal
- Location within New York

Location
- Country: United States
- Location: Hudson River, Coeymans, Albany County, New York
- Coordinates: 42°29′3″N 73°47′26″W

Details
- Opened: 2001
- Operated by: Port of Coeymans
- Owned by: Carver Companies

Statistics
- Website www.carvercompanies.com/port-of-coeymans-marine-terminal/

The Port of Coeymans is a marine terminal, owned by Carver Companies, located about ten miles south of Albany, New York and the Port of Albany-Rensselaer in the town of Coeymans, United States. The port is located on the site of the former Powell & Minnock Brick Company, and is sometimes referred to as the P&M Brick Marine Terminal. The port's large open spaces, as well as access to the Hudson River and New York State Thruway, have led to its use in prefabrication projects, including the Willis Avenue and 145th Street Bridges in New York City. The port developer and owner Carver Companies have invested more than $100 Million to update the facilities.

The Port of Coeymans also supported the building of the Tappan Zee Bridge on the Hudson River. Spans of the new bridge were built at the port and floated down the river. The old bridge spans were brought back to the Port, disassembled, reused or recycled.

The port built the foundation for Little Island in New York City. The project involves building structures that slide over piers on the waterfront in New York Harbor. The Port is in the running to be named as a production site for the Off-shore wind projects in New York. This is part of the New York State Offshore Wind Master Plan. The port would need $130 million in additional investment to make it ready to support the off-shore wind projects. The other ports in the running would take approximately twice that. Mammoet has a 660-ton crane on site for offshore wind components.
