= Alcove Canyon =

Landform in Apache County, Arizona

- Alcove Creek
- Floor elevation: 5,292 feet (1,613 m)

Geography
- Location: Apache County, Arizona, United States
- Coordinates: 36°41′28″N 109°15′05″W
- Rivers: Apache Creek, Walker Creek
- Interactive map of Alcove Canyon

Alcove Canyon is a valley in Apache County in the U.S. state of Arizona. The valley lies southwest of the Carrizo Mountains and extends to Walker Creek.

The head of the canyon is at 36°41′28″N 109°15′05″W and the confluence with Apache Creek. The elevation of the mouth is at 5,292 feet (1,613 m).

Alcove Canyon (or Alcove Creek) was so named due to the presence of erosional alcoves in the rock banks along its course.
