= Walker Creek (Apache County, Arizona) =

Stream

Coordinates: 36°57′42″N 109°41′35″W

Walker Creek is a stream in Apache County, Arizona. Its mouth is at an elevation of 4,688 feet (1,429 meters) at its confluence with Chinle Creek. Its source is located at, the confluence of Alcove Canyon and Tah Chin Lini Canyon in the Carrizo Mountains, from which it flows west and northwest to Chinle Creek at . Hogansaani Spring, a tributary, is located on the south side of Walker Creek, at an elevation of 5,102 feet (1,555 m), midway downstream Walker Creek to its confluence with Chinle Creek.

== History ==
Walker Creek was named in 1915 by Herbert E. Gregory for Captain Walker's Expedition of 1859. Part of its length was followed by the Armijo Route of the Old Spanish Trail.
