= Alcove Reservoir =

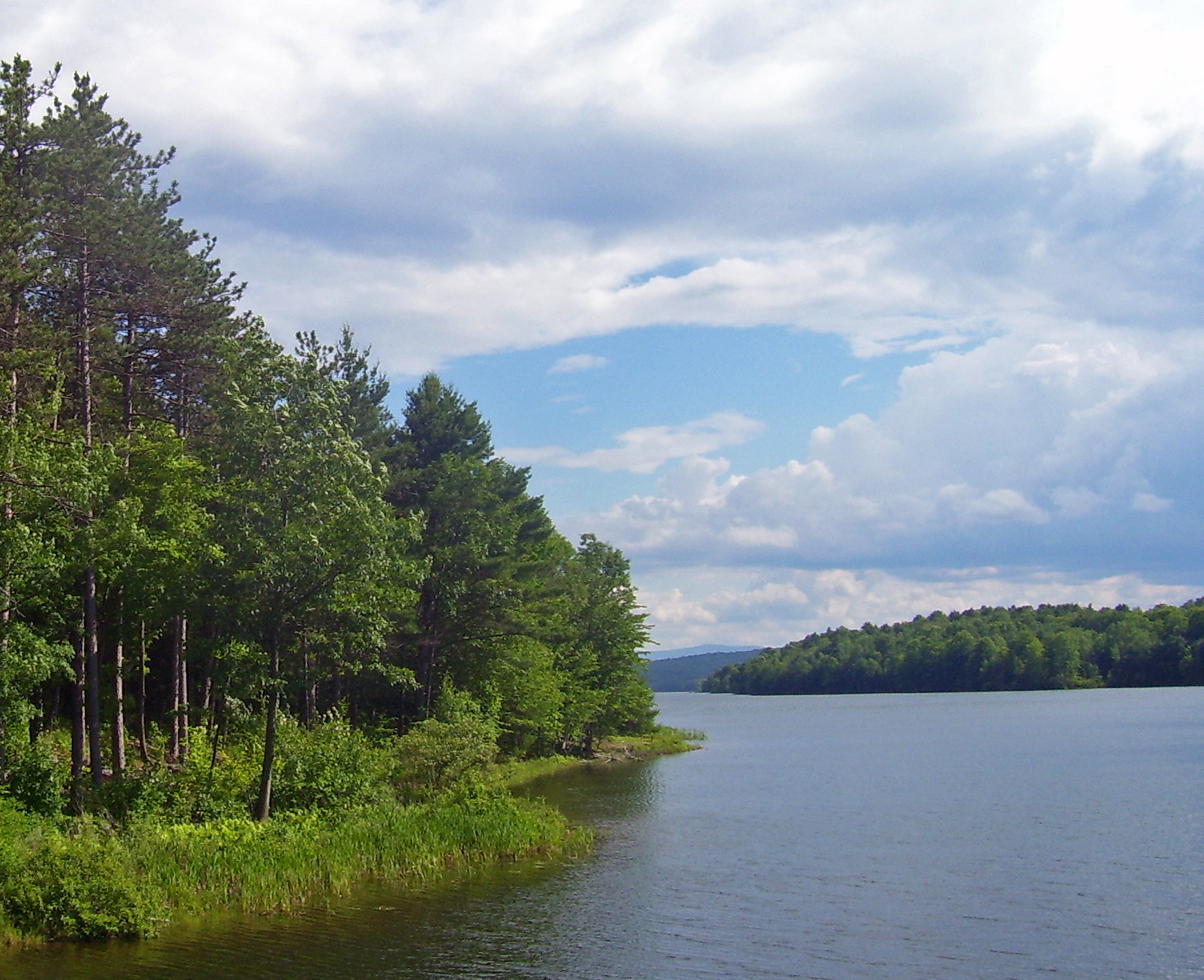
- Alcove Reservoir from NY 32

- Location within New York Location within the United States
- Location: Coeymans, Albany County, New York
- Coordinates: 42°28′04″N 073°55′53″W
- Type: reservoir
- Primary inflows: Hannacroix Creek
- Primary outflows: Hannacroix Creek
- Catchment area: 6,300 acres (2,500 ha)
- Basin countries: United States
- Surface area: 1,426 acres (577.1 ha)
- Average depth: 25 ft (7.6 m)
- Max. depth: 75 ft (23 m)
- Surface elevation: 618 ft (188 m)

Alcove Reservoir is a reservoir located in Albany County, New York, United States. It serves as a water supply for the city of Albany. At 618 ft (188 m) in elevation, the closest hamlet is Alcove, part of the town of Coeymans. New York State Route 32 passes the reservoir on the west. It was built in 1928–1932, inundating the village of Indian Fields.

The Alcove Reservoir is fed by the Hannacroix Creek, Silver Creek and Gulf Creek.
