= Westerlo, New York =

- Town
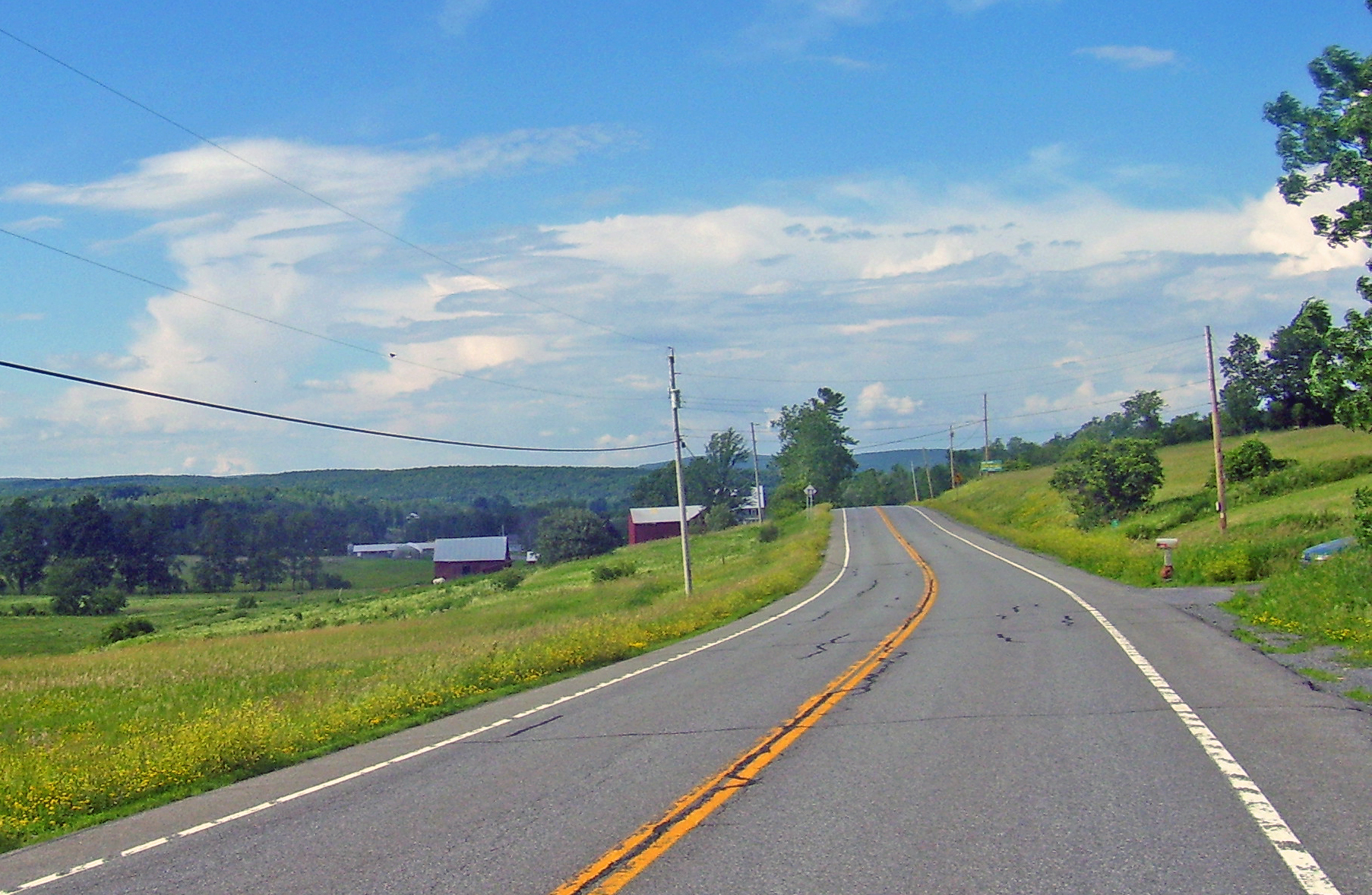
- State Route 32 - Westerlo

- Seal

- Location in Albany County and the state of New York.
- Coordinates: 42°30′41″N 74°2′46″W
- Country: United States
- State: New York
- County: Albany

Government
  - Type: Town Council
  - Supervisor: Matthew A. Kryzak (Republican Party)
  - Town Council: Members' List: • R. Gregory Zeh (D); • Edward A. Rash (D); • Robert Snyder (D); • Clinton Milner (R)

Area
  - Total: 58.54 sq mi (151.61 km^{2})
  - Land: 57.79 sq mi (149.68 km^{2})
  - Water: 0.75 sq mi (1.93 km^{2})
- Elevation: 1,142 ft (348 m)

Population (2020)
  - Total: 3,194
- Time zone: UTC-5 (Eastern (EST))
  - Summer (DST): UTC-4 (EDT)
- ZIP Codes: 12055 (Dormansville); 12193 (Westerlo); 12023 (Berne); 12083 (Greenville); 12147 (Rensselaerville)
- Area code: 518
- FIPS code: 36-001-79851
- GNIS feature ID: 0979619
- Website: townofwesterlony.com

Westerlo is a town in Albany County, New York, United States. The population was 3,194 at the 2020 census.

The town is on the southern border of Albany County and is served by New York State Route 143.

== History ==
Westerlo was formed from parts of the Towns of Coeymans and Rensselaerville in 1815. It is named after Rev. Eilardus Westerlo (1738–1790), who was minister of the Reformed Protestant Dutch Church (now called The First Church) in Albany, NY, from 1760 to 1790.

== Geography ==
According to the United States Census Bureau, the town has a total area of 58.5 square miles (152 km^{2}), of which 57.9 square miles (150 km^{2}) is land and 0.7 square miles (1.8 km^{2}) (1.14%) is water.

== Demographics ==
Historical population
Census	Pop.	Note	%±
1820	3,458		—
1830	3,321		−4.0%
1840	3,096		−6.8%
1850	2,860		−7.6%
1860	2,692		−5.9%
1870	2,384		−11.4%
1880	2,324		−2.5%
1890	1,949		−16.1%
1900	1,632		−16.3%
1910	1,307		−19.9%
1920	1,240		−5.1%
1930	1,220		−1.6%
1940	1,338		9.7%
1950	1,536		14.8%
1960	1,681		9.4%
1970	2,242		33.4%
1980	2,929		30.6%
1990	3,325		13.5%
2000	3,466		4.2%
2010	3,361		−3.0%
2020	3,194		−5.0%
U.S. Decennial Census 2020

As of the census of 2000, there were 3,466 people, 1,326 households, and 970 families residing in the town. The population density was 59.9 inhabitants per square mile (23.1/km^{2}). There were 1,537 housing units at an average density of 26.6 units per square mile (10.3 units/km^{2}). The racial makeup of the town was 98.27% White, 0.55% African American, 0.12% Native American, 0.20% Asian, 0.14% from other races, and 0.72% from two or more races. Hispanic or Latino of any race were 0.92% of the population.

There were 1,326 households, out of which 33.9% had children under the age of 18 living with them, 60.6% were married couples living together, 7.8% had a female householder with no husband present, and 26.8% were non-families. 22.2% of all households were made up of individuals, and 9.4% had someone living alone who was 65 years of age or older. The average household size was 2.61 and the average family size was 3.06.

In the town, the population was spread out, with 26.5% under the age of 18, 5.4% from 18 to 24, 28.9% from 25 to 44, 26.6% from 45 to 64, and 12.6% who were 65 years of age or older. The median age was 39 years. For every 100 females, there were 95.3 males. For every 100 females age 18 and over, there were 95.2 males.

The median income for a household in the town was $48,488, and the median income for a family was $55,660. Males had a median income of $39,516 versus $28,393 for females. The per capita income for the town was $21,000. About 4.4% of families and 5.4% of the population were below the poverty line, including 5.9% of those under age 18 and 2.5% of those age 65 or over.

Hannay Reels, the nation's largest manufacturer of hose reels, is located in Westerlo.

== Communities and locations in Westerlo ==
- Basic Estates – Residential Development off County Route 401 overlooking the Basic Creek Reservoir
- Bramans Corners – A location at the northern town line.
- Dormansville – A hamlet near the eastern town line.
- Ford Corners – A location north of Westerlo hamlet.
- Lambs Corner – A hamlet in the southwestern part of the town.
- Newry – A hamlet at the southern town line.
- Snyder's Corners – A location northwest of Westerlo village.
- South Westerlo – A hamlet near the southern town line.
- Westerlo – The hamlet of Westerlo is near the center of the town.

== Sports ==
- Clearview Speedway was a 1/3-mile (0.54 km) dirt oval facility opened in 1949 by David and Thurman Bishop in the hamlet of South Westerlo. The oval featured stock car racing and was one of a number of venues in the Capital District which contributed to the rise in popularity of auto racing after World War II. The facility operated until 1954 when a neighbor, objecting to the noise and the dust, bought the property and shut the track down. (Note: Geolocation of Clearview Speedway: 42.4505°N 74.0265°W)
