= Ravena, New York =

- Village
- Nickname: The Friendship Community
- Location in Albany County and the state of New York.

- Location within New York Location within the United States
- Coordinates: 42°28′35″N 73°48′51″W
- Country: United States
- State: New York
- County: Albany
- Town: Coeymans
- Incorporated: 1914

Government
  - Mayor: William Misuraca
  - Deputy Mayor: Nancy J. Warner
  - Trustees: Linda C. Muller; Caitlin Appleby; Sante DeBacco

Area
  - Total: 1.47 sq mi (3.82 km^{2})
  - Land: 1.47 sq mi (3.80 km^{2})
  - Water: 0.0039 sq mi (0.01 km^{2})
- Elevation: 230 ft (70 m)

Population (2020)
  - Total: 3,271
  - Density: 2,228.2/sq mi (860.33/km^{2})
- Time zone: UTC-5 (Eastern (EST))
  - Summer (DST): UTC-4 (EDT)
- ZIP Code: 12143
- Area code: 518
- FIPS code: 36-60675
- GNIS feature ID: 0962229
- Website: www.villageofravena.com

Ravena is a village in Albany County, New York, United States. The population was 3,271 in the 2020 census an increase of 3 over the 2010 census. The village is in the southeast part of the town of Coeymans.

== History ==
The village of Ravena incorporated in 1914. Prior to its incorporation, it was known as "Coeymans Junction," but the name was changed to "Ravena" to avoid confusion with another hamlet in the town, "Coeymans Landing."

In 1894, a post office was established in Coeymans Junction bearing the name Ravena. The name source of the post office (and ultimately the village) is unclear. Some believe that the village's proximity to cliffs on its western boundary lent to the area being referred to as the ravine. Others feel that a brand of flour, Raven, was the inspiration behind the name.

The Israel Shear House was listed on the National Register of Historic Places in 1996.

== Demographics ==
Historical population
Census	Pop.	Note	%±
1920	2,093		—
1930	1,963		−6.2%
1940	1,810		−7.8%
1950	2,006		10.8%
1960	2,410		20.1%
1970	2,797		16.1%
1980	3,091		10.5%
1990	3,547		14.8%
2000	3,369		−5.0%
2010	3,268		−3.0%
2020	3,271		0.1%
U.S. Decennial Census

=== 2020 census ===
As of the 2020 census, Ravena had a population of 3,271. The median age was 39.1 years. 22.0% of residents were under the age of 18 and 16.1% of residents were 65 years of age or older. For every 100 females there were 90.5 males, and for every 100 females age 18 and over there were 85.7 males age 18 and over.

100.0% of residents lived in urban areas, while 0.0% lived in rural areas.

There were 1,392 households in Ravena, of which 29.0% had children under the age of 18 living in them. Of all households, 38.5% were married-couple households, 18.0% were households with a male householder and no spouse or partner present, and 32.4% were households with a female householder and no spouse or partner present. About 32.1% of all households were made up of individuals and 12.1% had someone living alone who was 65 years of age or older.

There were 1,561 housing units, of which 10.8% were vacant. The homeowner vacancy rate was 2.4% and the rental vacancy rate was 12.4%.

Racial composition as of the 2020 census
Race	Number	Percent
White	2,661	81.4%
Black or African American	206	6.3%
American Indian and Alaska Native	1	0.0%
Asian	31	0.9%
Native Hawaiian and Other Pacific Islander	0	0.0%
Some other race	88	2.7%
Two or more races	284	8.7%
Hispanic or Latino (of any race)	207	6.3%

=== 2000 census ===
According to the 2000 U.S. Census, there were 3,369 people, 1,380 households, and 892 families residing in the village. The population density was 2,515.7 inhabitants per square mile (971.3/km^{2}). There were 1,487 housing units at an average density of 1,110.4 per square mile (428.7/km^{2}). The racial makeup of the village was 92.82% White, 2.91% African American, 0.27% Native American, 0.65% Asian, 0.03% Pacific Islander, 0.98% from other races, and 2.34% from two or more races. Hispanic or Latino of any race were 4.16% of the population.

There were 1,380 households, out of which 33.0% had children under the age of 18 living with them, 48.3% were married couples living together, 13.4% had a female householder with no husband present, and 35.3% were non-families. 29.5% of all households were made up of individuals, and 12.4% had someone living alone who was 65 years of age or older. The average household size was 2.41 and the average family size was 2.99.

In the village, the population was spread out, with 25.7% under the age of 18, 8.3% from 18 to 24, 31.3% from 25 to 44, 20.7% from 45 to 64, and 14.1% who were 65 years of age or older. The median age was 36 years. For every 100 females, there were 90.1 males. For every 100 females age 18 and over, there were 85.9 males.

The median income for a household in the village was $42,875 and the median income for a family was $54,875. Males had a median income of $40,351 versus $26,865 for females. The per capita income for the village was $20,145. About 8.4% of families and 8.9% of the population were below the poverty line, including 12.3% of those under age 18 and 5.4% of those age 65 or over.

== Education ==
The village of Ravena contains Ravena-Coeymans-Selkirk High School and Middle School, as well as Pieter B. Coeymans Elementary School in the Hamlet of Coeymans, one of two elementary schools in the district. The second elementary school, A.W. Becker Elementary, is located in the hamlet of Selkirk in the town of Bethlehem.

In addition to formal schooling, educational and entertainment information is available at the RCS Community Library which is located at 95 Main Street in the village of Ravena. The library serves the residents of the Ravena-Coeymans-Selkirk Central School District in southeastern Albany County, New York State and is a part of the Upper Hudson Library System. The library also provides in-house use of computers, photocopy and fax services to the public.

== Commerce and industry ==
=== Cement plant ===
The village of Ravena is home to a Holcim (Formerly Lafarge) Cement Plant. The plant was originally Atlantic Cement, but was bought out in the early 2000s. On July 11, 2008, the Albany Times Union reported that Holcim's (Formerly Lafarge) Ravena plant "was the greatest source of mercury emissions in New York from 2004 to 2006". According to the story, plans have been made to upgrade the plant to reduce the mercury emissions. A second story, published the following day, stated that the factory had emitted 400 pounds (181 kg) of mercury annually from 2004 to 2006.

As of 2016, Holcim is completing a $300 million upgrade to its Ravena plant that includes a new dry-process cement kiln that will replace two 50-year-old wet-process kilns. The new kiln will use less coal and emit fewer pollutants, including a 66% reduction in mercury emissions, while increasing production capacity. It will also take less water from the Hudson River, getting most of its water from the nearby limestone quarry that feeds the plant.

== Media ==
The News-Herald is Ravena's main newspaper, published weekly, which has designation for publication of legal notices.

== Recreation ==
Mosher Park is Ravena's main outdoor recreational area. It contains facilities for baseball, football, swimming, tennis, basketball, and picnics, with a skateboard park currently under development, though as of 2021 the skatepark has yet to be built. Mosher Park was named after Dr. Mosher, a Ravena-based General Practitioner from the 1950s through 1980s. The pool and tennis complex at Mosher replaced the Ravena Pool in the early 1970s.

== Law Enforcement ==
Police protection is provided by the Coeymans Police Department. The Ravena Police Department was merged with the Coeymans Police Department to improve efficiency. Eventually, it was determined to close the Ravena Police Department by referendum, at which point the Coeymans Police Department became the sole law enforcement agency for both the Village of Ravena and Town of Coeymans.

== Emergency Medical Services ==
Emergency Medical Services (EMS) are provided by the Ravena Rescue Squad. The Ravena Rescue Squad, formerly known as the Ravena Hose Company Rescue Squad, is a career agency. Formerly, the Ravena Rescue Squad was a volunteer agency, but due to lack of membership, it was decided by its board of directors to hire paid Emergency Medical Technicians (EMT). Currently, there are two (2) EMT's on duty at all times. The Rescue Squad runs out of the EMS station on Bruno Boulevard in Ravena.

== Fire and Emergency Services ==
Fire protection is provided to the Village of Ravena by the Ravena Fire Department as well as the Coeymans Fire Department. Both the Ravena Fire Department and the Coeymans Fire Department is a 100% volunteer organization. Along with fire protection, the Ravena Fire Department provides the residents of Ravena technical rescue services including vehicle extrication and technical rescue capabilities. Firefighters from the Ravena Fire Department are also trained to deal with certain levels of Hazardous Materials. Some Emergency Medical Services (EMS) are also provided by the fire department when the Ravena Rescue Squad is unable to respond due to being dedicated at other incidents. However in the event of a fire alarm activation at Ravena-Coeymans-Selkirk High/Middle School during school hours Ravena Fire Department, Coeymans Fire Department, Coeymans Hollow Fire Department, As well as Cornell Hook and Ladder (located in New Baltimore) will be dispatched all departments that have been named are volunteer departments.
