= Coeymans, New York =

- Town
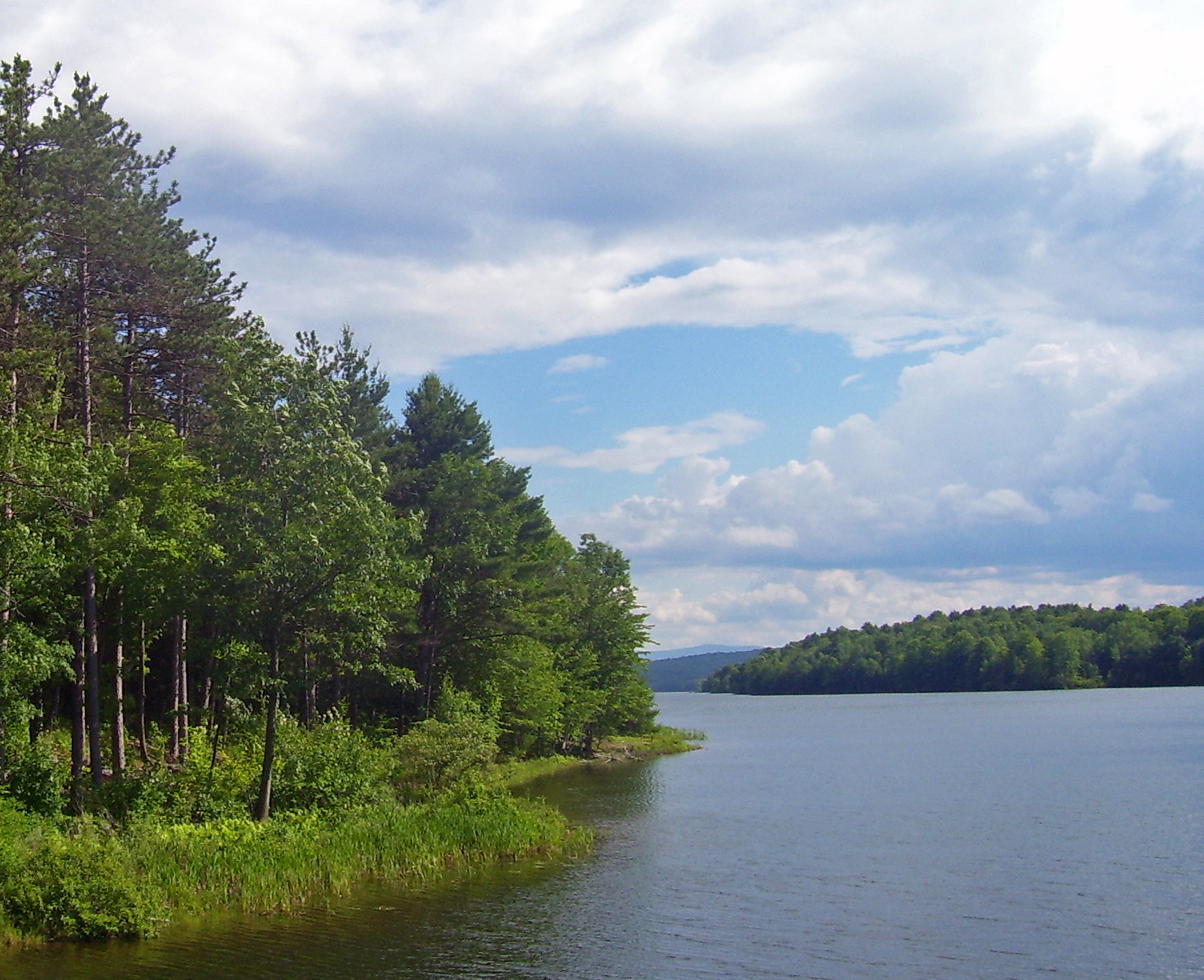
- Alcove Reservoir

- Seal

- Location in Albany County and the state of New York.
- Coordinates: 42°28′26″N 73°47′32″W
- Country: United States
- State: New York
- County: Albany
- Settled: 1639
- Incorporated: 1791

Government
  - Type: Town Council
  - Supervisor: Stephen Donnelly (D)
  - Town Council: Members' List: • Linda S. Bruno (R); • Michael J. Stott (D); • Stephen J. Schmitt (R); • Ronald J. Hotaling (D)

Area
  - Total: 53.17 sq mi (137.70 km^{2})
  - Land: 50.13 sq mi (129.83 km^{2})
  - Water: 3.04 sq mi (7.87 km^{2}) 5.50%
- Elevation: 1,467 ft (447 m)

Population (2020)
  - Total: 7,256
  - Density: 144.8/sq mi (55.89/km^{2})
- Time zone: UTC-5 (Eastern (EST))
  - Summer (DST): UTC-4 (EDT)
- ZIP Codes: 12045 (Coeymans); 12143 (Ravena); 12158 (Selkirk); 12046 (Coeymans Hollow); 12007 (Alcove); 12067 (Feura Bush); 12041 (Clarksville); 12193 (Westerlo); 12087 (Hannacroix)
- Area code: 518
- FIPS code: 36-001-16694
- GNIS feature ID: 0978845
- Website: www.coeymans.org

Coeymans is a town in Albany County, New York, United States. The population was 7,256 in the 2020 census, a decline from 7,418 at the 2010 census. The town is named after an early settler, who was the patent-holder for the area. The town is in the southeastern part of the county, south of Albany.

The Powell & Minnock Brick Yard, just north of the Hamlet on Rt. 144, was used as the assembly site for a new swing span for the 145th Street Bridge in 2006. The site was chosen because of a lack of space closer to the city.

== History ==
Barent Pieteres Koijemans first arrived in 1639 from Holland. He became an apprentice at a mill owned by the Van Rensselaers. He purchased the land and obtained a patent in 1673.

Coeymans was formed from part of the town of Watervliet in 1791. In 1815, part of the town was used to create the new town of Westerlo.

The Fletcher Blaisdell Farm Complex, Coeymans School, Ariaanje Coeymans House, Coeymans-Bronck Stone House, Mull House and Cemetery, Tobias Ten Eyck House and Cemeteries, and Cornelius and Agnietje Van Derzee House are listed on the National Register of Historic Places.

== Geography ==
According to the United States Census Bureau, the town has a total area of 53.1 square miles (137.5 km^{2}), of which 50.2 square miles (129.9 km^{2}) is land and 2.9 square miles (7.6 km^{2}) (5.50%) is water.

The southern town line is the border of Greene County, and the eastern town line, marked by the Hudson River, is the border of Rensselaer County.

Interstate 87 and U.S. Route 9W pass through the town.

== Demographics ==
Historical population
| Census | Pop. | Note | %± |
|---|---|---|---|
| 1810 | 3,574 | | — |
| 1820 | 2,872 | | −19.6% |
| 1830 | 2,723 | | −5.2% |
| 1840 | 3,107 | | 14.1% |
| 1850 | 3,050 | | −1.8% |
| 1860 | 3,117 | | 2.2% |
| 1870 | 3,077 | | −1.3% |
| 1880 | 2,912 | | −5.4% |
| 1890 | 3,669 | | 26.0% |
| 1900 | 3,952 | | 7.7% |
| 1910 | 4,252 | | 7.6% |
| 1920 | 4,147 | | −2.5% |
| 1930 | 4,542 | | 9.5% |
| 1940 | 4,536 | | −0.1% |
| 1950 | 4,713 | | 3.9% |
| 1960 | 5,622 | | 19.3% |
| 1970 | 6,715 | | 19.4% |
| 1980 | 7,896 | | 17.6% |
| 1990 | 8,158 | | 3.3% |
| 2000 | 8,151 | | −0.1% |
| 2010 | 7,418 | | −9.0% |
| 2020 | 7,256 | | −2.2% |
U.S. Decennial Census

According to the 2000 U.S. Census, there were 8,151 people, 3,121 households, and 2,184 families residing in the town. The population density was 162.5 inhabitants per square mile (62.7/km^{2}). There were 3,404 housing units at an average density of 67.8 per square mile (26.2/km^{2}). The racial makeup of the town was 94.61% White, 2.13% Black or African American, 0.22% Native American, 0.42% Asian, 0.02% Pacific Islander, 0.79% from other races, and 1.80% from two or more races. Hispanic or Latino of any race were 3.24% of the population.

There were 3,121 households, out of which 35.8% had children under the age of 18 living with them, 53.2% were married couples living together, 12.6% had a female householder with no husband present, and 30.0% were non-families. 24.6% of all households were made up of individuals, and 10.0% had someone living alone who was 65 years of age or older. The average household size was 2.59 and the average family size was 3.09.

In the town, the population was spread out, with 27.5% under the age of 18, 7.8% from 18 to 24, 30.4% from 25 to 44, 22.6% from 45 to 64, and 11.7% who were 65 years of age or older. The median age was 36 years. For every 100 females, there were 95.4 males. For every 100 females age 18 and over, there were 91.4 males.

The median income for a household in the town was $46,742, and the median income for a family was $57,808. Males had a median income of $41,197 versus $28,038 for females. The per capita income for the town was $21,686. About 5.7% of families and 6.9% of the population were below the poverty line, including 7.9% of those under age 18 and 7.0% of those age 65 or over.

== Economy ==
The economy of Coeymans is driven largely by Lafarge Cement Plant, and the Port of Coeymans which was developed over the former site of the Powell and Minnock brick plant on the shore of the Hudson River. The Lafarge Cement Plant generates approximately 1.8 million tons of cement per year, which is distributed throughout North America. The relatively new and developing Port of Coeymans focuses on a recycling hub for the Albany area, as well as offshore wind. The Port of Coeymans has had a number of environmental violations, air quality concerns, and fires on site.

== Communities and locations in Coeymans ==
- Alcove – A hamlet in the southwestern part of the town, east of the Alcove Reservoir.
- Alcove Reservoir – A reservoir at the western town line.
- Aquetuck – A hamlet near the southern town line.
- Coeymans – A hamlet in the southeastern part of the town, along Route 144 by the Hudson River.
- Callahans Corners – A location on the northern town line.
- Coeymans Hollow – A hamlet east of Alcove.
- Keefers Corners – A location in the northwestern part of the town.
- Ravena – A village in the southern part of the town on Route 9W.
- Roah Hook – A hamlet north of Coeymans hamlet, on the bank of the Hudson River.

== List of town supervisors ==
- Stephen Donnelly 2024 - present
- George D. McHugh 2020 – 2023
- Philip A. Crandall 2016 – 2019
- Stephen Flach 2012 - 2015
- James Youmans 2010 - 2011 (appointed October 2010)
- Henry Traver 2010 (resigned October 2010)
- Ronald K. Hotaling Jr. 2004 - 2009
- Joseph Scalzo 2002 - 2003
- George McHugh 2000 - 2001
- Robert Fisk 1998 - 1999
- Victor Carrk 1992 - 1997
- Nita J. Chmielewski 1990 - 1991 (resigned October 1991, Victor Carrk was appointed)
- Winthrop "Buddy" Irwin 1985 - 1989
- John Biscone 1974 - 1984
- Ralph Pape 1962 - 1973
- George Boehlke 1956 - 1961
- Fred Forbes 1954 - 1955
- Fred Halsted 1950 - 1953
- Edward Uthe 1938 - 1949
