= National Register of Historic Places listings in Albany County, New York =

Location of Albany County in New York

National Register of Historic Places listings in Albany County, New York exclusive of the City of Albany: This is intended to be a complete list of properties and districts listed on the National Register of Historic Places in Albany County, New York, besides those in the City of Albany, itself (which are listed here).

The locations of National Register properties and districts (at least for all showing latitude and longitude coordinates below) may be seen in a map by clicking on "Map of all coordinates".

This National Park Service list is complete through NPS recent listings posted July 31, 2026.

Contents: Counties in New York
Albany (Albany) – Allegany – Bronx – Broome – Cattaraugus – Cayuga – Chautauqua – Chemung – Chenango – Clinton – Columbia – Cortland – Delaware – Dutchess (Poughkeepsie, Rhinebeck) – Erie (Buffalo) – Essex – Franklin – Fulton – Genesee – Greene – Hamilton – Herkimer – Jefferson – Kings – Lewis – Livingston – Madison – Monroe (Rochester) – Montgomery – Nassau – New York (Below 14th Street, 14th to 59th Streets, 59th to 110th Streets, Above 110th Street, Islands) – Niagara (Niagara Falls) – Oneida – Onondaga (Syracuse) – Ontario – Orange – Orleans – Oswego – Otsego – Putnam – Queens – Rensselaer – Richmond – Rockland – St. Lawrence – Saratoga – Schenectady – Schoharie – Schuyler – Seneca – Steuben – Suffolk – Sullivan – Tioga – Tompkins – Ulster – Warren – Washington – Wayne – Westchester (Northern, Southern, New Rochelle, Peekskill, Yonkers) – Wyoming – Yates

== Current listings ==
=== Remainder of county ===
	Name on the Register	Image	Date listed	Location	City or town	Description
1	Albany Felt Company Complex	Albany Felt Company Complex	February 14, 2014 (#14000001)	1373 Broadway; 42°40′34″N 73°44′12″W	Menands	Early 20th-century factory complex with extensive landscaping
2	Albany Glassworks Site		July 22, 1980 (#80002583)	Address Restricted	Guilderland	
3	Albany Rural Cemetery	Albany Rural Cemetery	October 25, 1979 (#79001566)	Cemetery Ave. 42°42′21″N 73°44′12″W	Colonie	Albany Rural Cemetery was incorporated in 1841, and is one of the oldest examples of the rural cemetery movement in America. The cemetery was consecrated on October 7, 1844.
4	Alcove Historic District	Alcove Historic District	July 24, 1980 (#80002582)	SR 11 and Alcove Rd. 42°28′10″N 73°55′36″W	Alcove	
5	Altamont Historic District	Altamont Historic District	November 10, 1982 (#82001054)	Main St. between Thacher Dr. and the RR station 42°42′06″N 74°01′51″W	Altamont	
6	Apple Tavern	Apple Tavern	November 10, 1982 (#82001055)	4450 Altamont Rd. 42°42′37″N 73°58′28″W	Guilderland	
7	Aumic House		November 10, 1982 (#82001056)	Leesome Ln. 42°41′15″N 74°02′05″W	Guilderland	
8	Dr. John Babcock House	Dr. John Babcock House	December 10, 2003 (#03001278)	101 Lasher Rd. 42°32′58″N 73°48′47″W	Selkirk	
9	Bacon-Stickney House	Bacon-Stickney House	October 3, 1985 (#85002709)	441 Loudon Rd. 42°42′23″N 73°45′18″W	Colonie	
10	Beattie Machine Works	Beattie Machine Works	November 23, 2022 (#100008404)	24 Amity St. 42°46′14″N 73°42′43″W	Cohoes	
11	Bennett Hill Farm	Bennett Hill Farm	December 5, 2003 (#03001241)	Bennett Hill Rd. at Rowe Rd. 42°34′13″N 73°57′22″W	New Scotland	
12	Bethlehem Grange No. 137	Bethlehem Grange No. 137	January 11, 2002 (#01001443)	24 Bridge St. 42°32′54″N 73°48′38″W	Selkirk	
13	Bethlehem House	Bethlehem House	April 11, 1973 (#73001158)	E of Bethlehem off NY 144; 42°32′38″N 73°46′00″W	Bethlehem	
14	Fletcher Blaisdell Farm Complex		March 12, 2001 (#01000246)	Westerlo St. 42°28′20″N 73°48′00″W	Coeymans	
15	Dr. Wesley Blaisdell House	Dr. Wesley Blaisdell House	July 17, 2012 (#12000418)	S. Main St. 42°28′20″N 73°47′35″W	Coeymans Landing	
16	Bryan's Store	Bryan's Store	October 4, 1979 (#79003246)	435 Loudon Rd. 42°42′20″N 73°45′17″W	Loudonville	
17	Senator William T. Byrne House		October 3, 1985 (#85002703)	463 Loudon Rd. 42°42′35″N 73°45′19″W	Colonie	
18	Chapel House		November 10, 1982 (#82001057)	Western Ave. 42°40′55″N 73°49′51″W	Guilderland	
19	Clarksville Elementary School		July 3, 2008 (#08000580)	58 Verda Lane; 42°34′38″N 73°57′16″W	Clarksville	Modern Movement-style school built in 1949
20	Coeymans Landing Historic District		March 26, 2018 (#RS100001767)	4th and Main Sts. 42°28′29″N 73°47′34″W	Coeymans	One of state's oldest continuously occupied settlements, since 1673
21	Coeymans School	Coeymans School	December 29, 1970 (#70000418)	SW corner of Westerlo St. and Civill Ave. 42°28′22″N 73°47′55″W	Coeymans	
22	Ariaanje Coeymans House	Ariaanje Coeymans House	October 18, 1972 (#72000819)	Stone House Rd. 42°28′35″N 73°47′32″W	Coeymans	
23	Coeymans-Bronck Stone House		November 15, 2003 (#03001148)	NY 144; 42°27′59″N 73°47′30″W	Coeymans	
24	Conkling–Boardman–Eldridge Farm		February 2, 2016 (#15001022)	348 Albany Hill Road; 42°31′13″N 74°07′23″W	Rensselaerville	1806 farm established by one of the first families to settle in Rensselaerville
25	Coppola House		November 10, 1982 (#82001058)	Leesome Ln. 42°41′28″N 74°02′32″W	Guilderland	
26	Frederick Cramer House	Frederick Cramer House	October 3, 1985 (#85002704)	410 Albany-Shaker Rd. 42°41′53″N 73°46′12″W	Colonie	
27	Frederick Crouse House		November 10, 1982 (#82001059)	3960 Altamont-Voorheesville Rd. 42°40′49″N 74°01′13″W	Guilderland	
28	Jacob Crouse Inn		November 10, 1982 (#82001060)	3933 Altamont Rd. 42°42′18″N 74°01′10″W	Guilderland	
29	John and Henry Crouse Farm Complex		November 10, 1982 (#82001061)	3970 Altamont-Voorheesville Rd. 42°40′33″N 74°01′01″W	Guilderland	
30	D. D. T. Moore Farmhouse	D. D. T. Moore Farmhouse	October 4, 1979 (#79003244)	352 Loudon Rd. 42°41′36″N 73°45′20″W	Loudonville	
31	Delaware and Hudson Railroad Freight House	Delaware and Hudson Railroad Freight House	February 20, 1998 (#98000135)	116 Saratoga Ave. 42°46′20″N 73°41′56″W	Cohoes	
32	Delaware and Hudson Railroad Passenger Station	Delaware and Hudson Railroad Passenger Station	August 12, 1971 (#71000524)	Main St. and the Delaware and Hudson RR; 42°42′03″N 74°01′59″W	Altamont	
33	William J. Dickey House	William J. Dickey House	February 20, 1998 (#98000138)	16 Imperial Ave. 42°46′16″N 73°42′23″W	Cohoes	Intact 1890 Stick-Eastlake home with jerkined front roof built for textile mill manager.
34	District School No. 1	District School No. 1	May 20, 1998 (#98000553)	NY 144; 42°33′11″N 73°46′12″W	Bethlehem	
35	District School No. 7	District School No. 7	May 16, 1996 (#96000562)	NY 143, approximately .25 miles (0.40 km) west of the junction with Co. Rt. 103; 42°28′26″N 73°54′01″W	Coeymans Hollow	
36	Downtown Cohoes Historic District	Downtown Cohoes Historic District	September 13, 1984 (#84002060)	Roughly bounded by Oneida, Van Rensselaer, Columbia, Main, and Olmstead Sts. 42°46′24″N 73°42′03″W	Cohoes	1820-1930 core of community showing effects of development started by canal and textile industry
37	Martin Dunsbach House		October 3, 1985 (#85002705)	140 Dunsbach Ferry Rd. 42°47′06″N 73°45′25″W	Colonie	
38	Enlarged Erie Canal Historic District (Discontiguous)	Enlarged Erie Canal Historic District (Discontiguous)	May 14, 2004 (#04000434)	City of Cohoes, roughly from S to NW city boundary 42°51′20″N 73°42′09″W	Cohoes	
39	Fine Arts and Flower Building Altamont Fairground	Fine Arts and Flower Building Altamont Fairground	January 28, 2004 (#03001518)	Altamont Fairgrounds, vic. of Grand St. 42°41′54″N 74°01′46″W	Altamont	
40	First Reformed Dutch Church of Bethlehem	First Reformed Dutch Church of Bethlehem	November 25, 2002 (#02001398)	38 Church Rd; 42°33′43″N 73°48′18″W	Bethlehem	
41	Fonda House		April 21, 2004 (#04000351)	55 Western Ave. 42°46′09″N 73°43′41″W	Cohoes	
42	Freeman House	Freeman House	November 10, 1982 (#82001062)	136 Main St. 42°42′08″N 73°57′50″W	Guilderland	
43	Fuller's Tavern		November 10, 1982 (#82001063)	6861 Western Tpk. 42°43′12″N 73°57′26″W	Guilderland	
44	Royal K. Fuller House		October 3, 1985 (#85002706)	294 Loudon Rd. 42°41′00″N 73°45′11″W	Colonie	
45	Gardner House		November 10, 1982 (#82001064)	5661 Gardner Rd. 42°40′19″N 74°00′04″W	Guilderland	
46	Gifford Grange Hall	Gifford Grange Hall	November 10, 1982 (#82001065)	Western Tpk. 42°44′23″N 74°00′54″W	Guilderland	
47	Gillespie House	Gillespie House	November 10, 1982 (#82001066)	2554 Western Tpk; 42°42′45″N 73°55′48″W	Guilderland	
48	Godfrey Farmhouse		October 4, 1979 (#79003240)	1313 Loudon Rd. 42°48′28″N 73°44′05″W	Cohoes	
49	Goodrich School	Goodrich School	September 22, 2000 (#00001156)	Fiddlers Ln. 42°43′43″N 73°44′46″W	Colonie	
50	Gorham House		October 4, 1979 (#79003239)	347 Loudon Rd. 42°41′30″N 73°45′06″W	Loudonville	
51	Hiram Griggs House	Hiram Griggs House	July 19, 2010 (#10000483)	111 Prospect Terrace; 42°42′06″N 74°02′07″W	Altamont	
52	Guilderland Cemetery Vault		November 10, 1982 (#82001067)	In Guilderland Cemetery, NY 158; 42°42′45″N 73°59′16″W	Guilderland	
53	Hamilton Union Church Rectory		November 10, 1982 (#82001068)	2267 Western Tpk. 42°42′10″N 73°54′27″W	Guilderland	
54	Hamilton Union Presbyterian Church	Hamilton Union Presbyterian Church	November 10, 1982 (#82001069)	2291 Western Tpk. 42°42′14″N 73°54′32″W	Guilderland	
55	Harmony Mill No. 3	Harmony Mill No. 3	February 18, 1971 (#71000525)	100 N. Mohawk St. 42°46′54″N 73°42′19″W	Cohoes	
56	Harmony Mills Historic District	Harmony Mills Historic District	January 12, 1978 (#78003151)	Between Mohawk River and RR tracks 42°46′54″N 73°42′34″W	Cohoes	Thousand-foot-long textile mill built in 1872 is preserved in excellent condition. The largest cotton mill in the United States when first built; was a major employer in the city when open.
57	Isaac M. Haswell House		October 3, 1985 (#85002707)	67 Haswell Rd. 42°44′54″N 73°43′34″W	Colonie	
58	Hayes House	Hayes House	January 17, 1973 (#73001157)	104 Fairview Ave. 42°41′57″N 74°01′52″W	Altamont	
59	Hedge Lawn		October 3, 1985 (#85002710)	592 Broadway; 42°42′21″N 73°42′55″W	Colonie	
60	Helderberg Reformed Dutch Church		November 10, 1982 (#82001070)	140 Main St. 42°42′10″N 73°57′52″W	Guilderland	
61	Henry-Remsen House		October 3, 1985 (#85002711)	34 Spring St. 42°42′58″N 73°45′02″W	Colonie	
62	Ebenezer Hills Jr. Farmhouse		October 3, 1985 (#85002712)	1010 Troy–Schenectady Rd. 42°45′44″N 73°48′10″W	Colonie	
63	Adam Hilton House		November 10, 1982 (#82001071)	6073 Leesome Ln. 42°41′31″N 74°02′19″W	Guilderland	
64	Houck Farmhouse		November 10, 1982 (#82001072)	6156 Ostrander Rd. 42°41′53″N 73°56′48″W	Guilderland	
65	Abraham Houghtaling House		February 20, 1998 (#98000134)	54 Church St. 42°28′28″N 73°47′56″W	Coeymans Landing	
66	Teunis Houghtaling House	Teunis Houghtaling House	July 28, 2004 (#04000751)	1045 Clarksville South Rd. 42°33′53″N 73°58′32″W	Clarksville	
67	House at 698 Kenwood Avenue	House at 698 Kenwood Avenue	February 7, 2012 (#11001087)	698 Kenwood Avenue; 42°37′43″N 73°51′45″W	Slingerlands	
68	Hughson Mansion		October 4, 1979 (#79003245)	374 Loudon Rd. 42°41′45″N 73°45′19″W	Loudonville	
69	Friend Humphrey House		October 3, 1985 (#85002713)	372 Albany-Shaker Rd. 42°41′32″N 73°45′49″W	Colonie	
70	John Wolf Kemp House		October 3, 1985 (#85002714)	216 Wolf Rd. 42°43′33″N 73°47′57″W	Colonie	Was demolished in May 2003
71	Knower House		November 10, 1982 (#82001073)	3921 Altamont Rd. 42°42′17″N 74°01′13″W	Guilderland	
72	Knox District School No. 5		May 19, 2005 (#05000441)	Ketchum Rd. 42°39′38″N 74°02′43″W	Knox	
73	J. Leonard Lackman House	J. Leonard Lackman House	February 20, 1998 (#98000136)	28 Imperial Ave. 42°46′15″N 73°42′23″W	Cohoes	Intact 1895 Queen Anne-style home of local gunsmith-locksmith
74	Lainhart Farm Complex and Dutch Barn	Lainhart Farm Complex and Dutch Barn	June 8, 2001 (#01000579)	6755 Lainhart; 42°43′26″N 74°01′56″W	Altamont	
75	John V. A. Lansing Farmhouse and Billsen Cemetery and Archeological Site		October 3, 1985 (#85002715)	Address Restricted	Colonie	
76	George H. Lawton House		October 3, 1985 (#85002741)	27 Maxwell Rd. 42°43′28″N 73°45′24″W	Colonie	
77	LeGrange Farmstead	LeGrange Farmstead	December 7, 2005 (#05001384)	122 Pauley Ln. 42°39′13″N 73°52′56″W	Slingerlands	
78	Lock 18 of Enlarged Erie Canal	Lock 18 of Enlarged Erie Canal	February 18, 1971 (#71000526)	W of 252 N. Mohawk St., E of Reservoir St. near Manor Ave. 42°47′08″N 73°42′44″W	Cohoes	High-quality stonework of this ca. 1840 lock on Erie Canal remains; only one of ten in city of Cohoes listed.
79	Loudon Road Historic District		October 4, 1979 (#79003247)	Loudon Rd. from Crumite Rd. to Menands Rd. 42°42′02″N 73°45′17″W	Loudonville	
80	Mark House		August 29, 2022 (#100008066)	99 Johnson Rd. 42°45′54″N 73°44′02″W	Colonie	
81	Matton Shipyard	Matton Shipyard	July 24, 2009 (#09000553)	Delaware Ave. 42°46′46″N 73°40′50″W	Cohoes	
82	Brigadier General David McCarty Stone Cottage		July 28, 2015 (#15000474)	29 2nd St. 42°28′29″N 73°47′32″W	Coeymans Landing	Mid-18th-century residence of militia officer who served in the Continental Army
83	Dr. Jay McDonald Towers		January 26, 2026 (#100012614)	19 Remsen St; 42°46′35″N 73°42′04″W	Cohoes	
84	McKownville-Country Club Highlands Historic District		June 2, 2022 (#100007747)	Western Ave., Waverly Pl., Norwood, Glenwood, Parkwood, and Elmwood Sts. 42°40′51″N 73°50′06″W	Guilderland	
85	McNiven Farm Complex		November 10, 1982 (#82001074)	4178 Altamont Rd. 42°42′20″N 74°00′10″W	Guilderland	
86	Menand Park Historic District		October 3, 1985 (#85002708)	Roughly bounded by Menand Rd., Broadway, and Tillinghast Ave. 42°41′38″N 73°43′27″W	Menands	
87	Louis Menand House		October 3, 1985 (#85002742)	40 Cemetery Ave. 42°42′10″N 73°43′24″W	Colonie	
88	Menands Manor		October 3, 1985 (#85002743)	272 Broadway; 42°41′35″N 73°43′31″W	Colonie	
89	Mull House and Cemetery	Mull House and Cemetery	July 22, 1999 (#99000871)	65 Fox St. 42°30′17″N 73°46′55″W	Coeymans	
90	Music Hall	Music Hall	February 18, 1971 (#71000527)	NW corner of Remsen and Oneida Sts. 42°46′34″N 73°42′07″W	Cohoes	1874 brick building is most significant Second Empire building in Cohoes, with highly decorated facade unusual for the style. Still in use as theater after 1975 restoration, making it fourth-oldest music hall in use in the nation.
91	Mynderse-Frederick House	Mynderse-Frederick House	November 10, 1982 (#82001075)	152 Main St. 42°42′10″N 73°57′55″W	Guilderland	
92	Newtonville Post Office	Newtonville Post Office	March 14, 1973 (#73001162)	552 New Loudon Rd. (NY 9); 42°43′20″N 73°45′26″W	Newtonville	
93	Newtonville School		September 22, 2000 (#00001155)	543 Loudon Rd. 42°43′15″N 73°45′21″W	Newtonville	
94	Newtonville United Methodist Church	Newtonville United Methodist Church	May 30, 2001 (#01000580)	Louden Rd. at Maxwell Rd. 42°43′28″N 73°45′36″W	Newtonville	
95	New York State Barge Canal	New York State Barge Canal	October 15, 2014 (#14000860)	Linear across county 42°47′43″N 73°42′51″W	Colonie and Cohoes	Successor to Erie Canal approved by state voters in early 20th century to compete with railroads
96	Norman Vale		December 11, 2009 (#09001079)	6030 Nott Rd. 42°41′21″N 73°54′20″W	Guilderland	
97	Ohio Street Methodist Episcopal Church Complex	Ohio Street Methodist Episcopal Church Complex	December 8, 2005 (#05001393)	1921 Third Ave. 42°43′52″N 73°42′11″W	Watervliet	
98	Olmstead Street Historic District	Olmstead Street Historic District	June 19, 1973 (#73001159)	Olmstead St. between Ontario and Cayuga Sts. 42°46′30″N 73°42′12″W	Cohoes	Mill, portion of original Erie Canal and homes built for millworkers, all dating from mid-19th century. A microcosm of the city's economy of that era.
99	Onesquethaw Valley Historic District	Onesquethaw Valley Historic District	January 17, 1974 (#74001216)	About 10 miles (16 km) southwest of Albany off NY 43; 42°33′20″N 73°54′15″W	New Scotland	
100	Stephen Pangburn House	Stephen Pangburn House	November 10, 1982 (#82001076)	2357 Old State; 42°44′35″N 73°58′58″W	Guilderland	
101	Charles Parker House	Charles Parker House	November 10, 1982 (#82001077)	2273 Old State; 42°44′31″N 73°59′21″W	Guilderland	
102	Patterson Farmhouse		April 28, 1997 (#96001427)	47 Murray Ave. 42°36′38″N 73°50′33″W	Delmar	
103	Pine Hollow Road Historic District		May 18, 2026 (#100013008)	16, 28, 34 Pine Hollow Rd; 42°38′03″N 73°51′22″W	Slingerlands	
104	Potter Hollow District No. 19 School	Potter Hollow District No. 19 School	January 4, 2012 (#11000993)	County Road 354; 42°25′25″N 74°13′35″W	Potter Hollow	
105	Presbyterian Church in New Scotland and the New Scotland Cemetery	Presbyterian Church in New Scotland and the New Scotland Cemetery	August 29, 2010 (#10000592)	2010 New Scotland Rd. and 478 New Scotland Rd. S. 42°37′53″N 73°54′22″W	New Scotland	
106	Prospect Hill Cemetery Building	Prospect Hill Cemetery Building	November 10, 1982 (#82001078)	Western Tpk. 42°41′58″N 73°53′58″W	Guilderland	
107	Casparus F. Pruyn House	Casparus F. Pruyn House	October 3, 1985 (#85002744)	207 Old Niskayuna Rd. 42°43′55″N 73°46′43″W	Colonie	
108	Reformed Dutch Church of Rensselaer in Watervliet	Reformed Dutch Church of Rensselaer in Watervliet	October 3, 1985 (#85002745)	210 Old Loudon Rd. 42°44′52″N 73°45′35″W	Colonie	
109	Alfred H. Renshaw House		October 3, 1985 (#85002746)	33 Fiddlers Ln. 42°43′26″N 73°45′02″W	Colonie	
110	Rensselaer and Saratoga Railroad: Green Island Shops	Rensselaer and Saratoga Railroad: Green Island Shops	May 24, 1973 (#73001161)	James and Tibbits Sts. and the Delaware and Hudson RR tracks 42°45′02″N 73°41′34″W	Green Island	
111	Rensselaerville Historic District	Rensselaerville Historic District	September 15, 1983 (#83001635)	Old Albany, Pond Hill, Methodist Hill Rds. and Main St. 42°30′59″N 74°08′06″W	Rensselaerville	
112	Rose Hill	Rose Hill	November 10, 1982 (#82001079)	2259 Western Tpk. 42°42′09″N 73°54′20″W	Guilderland	
113	Roulier Heights Historic District		January 26, 2026 (#100012613)	51 Roulier Heights; 42°46′29″N 73°42′21″W	Cohoes	
114	Rowe Farm	Rowe Farm	February 3, 2012 (#11001088)	281 Bridge St. 42°32′17″N 73°49′34″W	South Bethlehem	
115	Henry M. Sage Estate		July 4, 1980 (#80004398)	1 Sage Rd. 42°41′38″N 73°44′02″W	Menands	
116	St. Agnes Cemetery	St. Agnes Cemetery	February 28, 2008 (#08000095)	48 Cemetery Ave. 42°42′08″N 73°43′41″W	Menands	
117	St. Mark's Episcopal Church	St. Mark's Episcopal Church	November 7, 1978 (#78001839)	69-75 Hudson Ave. 42°44′30″N 73°41′30″W	Green Island	
118	St. Mark's Lutheran Church	St. Mark's Lutheran Church	November 10, 1982 (#82001080)	Main St. 42°42′16″N 73°58′10″W	Guilderland	Now "Centerpointe Church"
119	St. Nicholas Ukrainian Catholic Church	St. Nicholas Ukrainian Catholic Church	April 15, 2004 (#04000288)	4th Ave. and 24th St. 42°44′04″N 73°42′13″W	Watervliet	
120	St. Paul's Evangelical Lutheran Church		November 2, 2016 (#16000751)	1728 Helderberg Trail; 42°37′31″N 74°08′31″W	Berne	1835 brick church marks transition between Federal and Greek Revival styles; hosted first state Anti-Rent convention ten years after construction.
121	John Schoolcraft House	John Schoolcraft House	November 10, 1982 (#82001081)	2299 Western Tpk. 42°42′14″N 73°54′36″W	Guilderland	
122	Schoolhouse No. 6	Schoolhouse No. 6	November 10, 1982 (#82001082)	206 Main St. 42°42′14″N 73°58′08″W	Guilderland	
123	Schoonmaker House	Schoonmaker House	December 28, 2001 (#01001396)	283 Beaver Dam Rd. 42°32′40″N 73°47′47″W	Selkirk	
124	Schuyler Flatts Archaeological District	Schuyler Flatts Archaeological District	January 21, 1974 (#74001217)	Address Restricted	Menands	Area with evidence of 4,000 years of human habitation
125	Sharp Brothers House		November 10, 1982 (#82001083)	4382 Western Tpk. 42°44′07″N 73°59′20″W	Guilderland	
126	Sharp Farmhouse		November 10, 1982 (#82001084)	4379 Western Tpk. 42°44′10″N 73°59′20″W	Guilderland	
127	Israel Shear House	Israel Shear House	December 6, 1996 (#96001436)	NY 143, NW of jct. with Gedney Hill Rd., Hamlet of Coymans Hollow; 42°28′20″N 73°53′56″W	Ravena	
128	Silliman Memorial Presbyterian Church	Silliman Memorial Presbyterian Church	August 1, 1979 (#79001565)	Mohawk and Seneca Sts. 42°46′28″N 73°42′02″W	Cohoes	1896 Romanesque church demolished in 1998.
129	Simmons Stone House		October 3, 1985 (#85002747)	554 Boght Rd. 42°47′01″N 73°44′15″W	Colonie	
130	Slingerlands Historic District	Slingerlands Historic District	February 14, 2012 (#12000007)	New Scotland & Mullens Rds., Bridge St. 42°37′47″N 73°51′45″W	Slingerlands	
131	Albert Slingerland House	Albert Slingerland House	February 14, 1997 (#97000068)	36 Bridge St. 42°37′43″N 73°51′29″W	Slingerlands	
132	Springwood Manor		October 4, 1979 (#79003243)	498 Loudon Rd. 42°42′50″N 73°45′26″W	Loudonville	
133	Jedediah Strong House		October 3, 1985 (#85002748)	379 Vly Rd. 42°46′00″N 73°49′42″W	Colonie	
134	Tobias Ten Eyck House and Cemeteries		November 25, 1994 (#94001375)	Old Ravena Rd. (Pictuay Rd.) N of jct. with US 9W; 42°30′45″N 73°48′18″W	Coeymans	
135	John S. Tilley Ladders Company		May 15, 2017 (#100000993)	122 2nd Street; 42°42′29″N 73°42′33″W	Watervliet	
136	Treemont Manor		October 3, 1985 (#85002749)	71 Old Niskayuna Rd. 42°42′52″N 73°45′49″W	Colonie	
137	George Trimble House		October 3, 1985 (#85002750)	158 Spring Street Rd. 42°42′49″N 73°43′34″W	Colonie	
138	Turner Farmhouse	Turner Farmhouse	November 23, 2022 (#100008395)	475 Loudon Rd. 42°42′40″N 73°45′19″W	Loudonville	
139	US Post Office-Delmar	US Post Office-Delmar	November 17, 1988 (#88002480)	357 Delaware Ave. 42°37′22″N 73°49′57″W	Delmar	1940 building, is only one of 13 Louis Simon post offices in state without a cupola. WPA mural in lobby.
140	Valley Paper Mill Chimney and Site	Valley Paper Mill Chimney and Site	April 21, 2004 (#04000350)	NY 143 at Cty Rd. 111; 42°28′24″N 73°55′24″W	Alcove	
141	Van Denbergh-Simmons House		October 3, 1985 (#85002751)	537 Boght Rd. 42°47′07″N 73°44′05″W	Colonie	
142	C. Van Der Zee House		January 11, 2002 (#01001434)	NY 143 at Blossom Hill Rd. 42°28′11″N 73°52′46″W	Coeymans Hollow	
143	Van Derheyden House		May 30, 2001 (#01000582)	823 Delaware Ave. 42°36′37″N 73°52′02″W	Delmar	
144	Cornelius and Agnietje Van Derzee House		April 6, 2005 (#05000259)	Van Derzee Rd. 42°27′18″N 73°51′49″W	Coeymans	
145	Van Patten Barn Complex		November 10, 1982 (#82001086)	4773 Western Tpk. 42°43′35″N 73°57′51″W	Guilderland	
146	Van Schaick House	Van Schaick House	March 18, 1971 (#71000528)	Van Schaick Ave. and the Delaware & Hudson RR track 42°46′03″N 73°41′13″W	Cohoes	
147	Vanderpool Farm Complex		November 10, 1982 (#82001085)	3647 Settles Hill Rd. 42°43′50″N 74°02′13″W	Guilderland	
148	Veeder Farmhouse No. 1		November 10, 1982 (#82001087)	3770 Western Tpk. 42°44′32″N 74°01′29″W	Guilderland	
149	Veeder Farmhouse No. 2		November 10, 1982 (#82001088)	3858 Western Tpk; 42°44′33″N 74°01′39″W	Guilderland	
150	Verdoy Schoolhouse	Verdoy Schoolhouse	March 9, 1997 (#97000117)	207 Old Niskayuna Rd. 42°43′56″N 73°46′42″W	Newtonville	Originally added to the National Register on October 3, 1985 with reference number 85002752, then delisted and relisted
151	Watervliet Arsenal	Watervliet Arsenal	November 13, 1966 (#66000503)	S. Broadway; 42°43′02″N 73°42′33″W	Watervliet	Oldest U.S. arsenal in continuous use.
152	Watervliet Shaker Historic District	Watervliet Shaker Historic District	February 20, 1973 (#73001160)	Watervliet Shaker Rd. 42°44′23″N 73°49′06″W	Colonie	
153	Watervliet Side Cut Locks	Watervliet Side Cut Locks	August 12, 1971 (#71000529)	23rd St. at the Hudson River; 42°43′55″N 73°41′55″W	Watervliet	
154	Wheeler Home		October 4, 1979 (#79003241)	485 Loudon Rd. 42°42′46″N 73°45′11″W	Loudonville	
155	Sidney White House		December 7, 2005 (#05001394)	483 Travis Hill Rd. 42°28′09″N 74°11′59″W	Preston Hollow	
156	Whitney Mansion		October 4, 1979 (#79003242)	489 Loudon Rd. 42°42′51″N 73°45′13″W	Loudonville	
157	Alexander Willis House		April 16, 2004 (#04000289)	NY 143; 42°28′28″N 73°47′48″W	Coeymans Landing	

== See also ==
- History of Albany, New York
- List of New York State Historic Markers in Albany County, New York
