= Houghtaling =

Houghtaling is a surname. Notable people with the surname include:

- Eric Houghtaling (born 1954), American politician
- John Houghtaling (1916–2009)
- John W. Houghtaling II (born 1971)

== See also ==
- Teunis Houghtaling House
- Abraham Houghtaling House
- Peter Houghtaling Farm and Lime Kiln
- Jennifer Mudd Houghtaling Postpartum Depression Foundation
