= Simmons House =

Simmons House may refer to:

- William Adam Simmons House, Half Moon Bay, CA, listed on the NRHP in California
- Merrick-Simmons House, Fernandina Beach, FL, listed on the NRHP in Florida
- Wirick-Simmons House, Monticello, FL, listed on the NRHP in Florida
- Simmons House (Cave Spring, Georgia), Cave Spring, GA, listed on the NRHP in Georgia
- William S. Simmons Plantation, Cave Spring, GA, listed on the NRHP in Georgia
- Simmons-Cullars House, Lincolnton, GA, listed on the NRHP in Georgia
- James B. Simmons House, Toccoa, GA, listed on the NRHP in Georgia
- John P. Simmons House, Des Moines, IA, listed on the NRHP in Iowa
- Simmons House (Richmond, Kentucky), Richmond, KY, listed on the NRHP in Kentucky
- Warren-Guild-Simmons House, Jackson, MS, listed on the NRHP in Mississippi
- Simmons House (Magnolia, Mississippi), Magnolia, MS, listed on the NRHP in Mississippi
- Simmonsen's House, Lodge Grass, MT, listed on the NRHP in Montana
- Simmons Stone House, Colonie, NY, listed on the NRHP in New York
- Van Denbergh-Simmons House, Colonie, NY, listed on the NRHP in New York
- Stephen Simmons House, Hounsfield, NY, listed on the NRHP in New York
- Alton Simmons House, Syracuse, NY, listed on the NRHP in Syracuse, New York
- Foscue and Simmons Plantations, Pollocksbille, NC, listed on the NRHP in North Carolina
- Edwin H. Simmons House, Perrysburg, OH, listed on the NRHP in Ohio
- Hood-Simmons House, Perrysburg, OH, listed on the NRHP in Ohio
- Louis B. Simmons House, Duncan, OK, listed on the NRHP in Oklahoma
- Simmons-Edwards House, Charleston, SC, listed on the NRHP in South Carolina
- Robert Simmons House, Frogmore, SC, listed on the NRHP in South Carolina
- Simmons-Harth House, Lexington, SC, listed on the NRHP in South Carolina
- Simmons House (Aberdeen, South Dakota), Aberdeen, SD, listed on the NRHP in South Dakota
- Peter Simmons House, Winchester, TN, listed on the NRHP in Tennessee
- Simmons Island Beach House, Kenosha, WI, listed on the NRHP in Wisconsin
- Simmons Ranch, Fruitland, UT, listed on the NRHP in Utah
- Simmons-Sebrell-Camp House, Courtland, VA, listed on the NRHP in Virginia
