= Lawton House =

Lawton House may refer to:

- Chauncey N. Lawton House South Bend, Indiana, listed on the NRHP in St. Joseph County, Indiana
- A house of the Henry Ware Lawton family, such as 1511 S. 4th Street in Old Louisville, Kentucky, or The Beeches. These were models for The Waltons television series.
- George H. Lawton House, Colonie, New York, listed on the NRHP in Albany County, New York
- Wildcliff, also known as Cyrus Lawton House, in New Rochelle, New York, in Westchester County
- Robert Lawton Jones House, Tulsa, Oklahoma, listed on the NRHP in Tulsa County
- Lawton-Almy-Hall Farm, Portsmouth, Rhode Island, listed on the NRHP in Newton County
- John Lawton House, Estill, South Carolina, listed on the NRHP in Hampton County
- Lawton House, also known as Home Hill, in Falls Church, Virginia

== See also ==
- Lawton Hall, Cheshire, England
