= Stickney House =

Stickney House may refer to:

in the United States (by state then city)

- Charles H. Stickney House, Pueblo, Colorado, listed on the National Register of Historic Places (NRHP) in Pueblo County
- George Stickney House, Woodstock, Illinois, listed on the NRHP in McHenry County
- Stickney-Shepard House, Cambridge, Massachusetts, listed on the NRHP in Middlesex County
- Bacon-Stickney House, Colonie, New York, listed on the NRHP in Albany County
- Stickney House (Lockport, New York), listed on the NRHP in Niagara County
