= Charles Rockwell =

American minister and author

- Born: November 22, 1806; Colebrook, Connecticut
- Died: April 17, 1882 (aged 75); Albany, New York
- Education: Yale College
- Occupation: Author
- Parents: Martin Rockwell (father); Mary Rockwell (mother)

Charles Rockwell (November 22, 1806 – April 17, 1882) was an American minister and author.

He graduated from Yale College in 1826. After leaving college, he was engaged in teaching for about five years - for more than two of them in the Deaf and Dumb Asylum in Hartford, Connecticut. In 1834, he completed a three-year course of theological study at Andover Seminary. For two and a half years after his ordination, at Hartford, September 23, 1834, he performed service as Chaplain in the U.S. Navy, attached to vessels of the Mediterranean squadron. As a result of this cruise, he published in 1842 two volumes of Sketches of Foreign Travel and Life at Sea.

After his return, he was installed on March 27, 1839, as pastor of the Congregational Church in Chatham, Massachusetts, where he remained until 1845. The health of his family rendering a change of climate that was more desirable, he moved in 1846 to Pontiac, Michigan, and after preaching there for a year, went to Kentucky for two years of preaching and teaching. From April 1850, to June 1851, he supplied the pulpit of the Congregational Church in Sharon, Connecticut, and after a series of short engagements with various churches, became the pastor of a Dutch Reformed Church in Catskill, New York, in June, 1860. After closing this pastorate, in 1866, he published a volume on The Catskill Mountains and the Regions Around, which passed through several editions.

He continued for several years preaching and teaching in various places, and finally at the age of 74, in infirm health, became an inmate of the Home for Aged Men, in Albany, New York, in October 1880. He died there of dropsy on April 17, 1882.

His first wife, Mary Howes, of Chatham, Massachusetts, to whom he was married July 29, 1839, died in Henderson, Kentucky, in 1848. He was married on June 10, 1852, to Mary Dayton, of East Hampton, New York, who died before him. Of three children by his first marriage, one son survived him.
