= Colonie (village), New York =

Colonie
- Village
- Village of Colonie
- Flag Seal
- Etymology: Dutch referring to Rensselaerswyck, the land outside of old Albany
- Location in Albany County and the state of New York.

- Location of New York in the United States
- Coordinates: 42°43′15″N 73°50′3″W
- Country: United States
- State: New York
- County: Albany
- Town: Colonie
- Incorporated: March 2, 1921

Government

Area
  - Total: 3.24 sq mi (8.40 km^{2})
  - Land: 3.24 sq mi (8.40 km^{2})
  - Water: 0.0039 sq mi (0.01 km^{2})
- Elevation: 312 ft (95 m)

Population (2020)
  - Total: 7,781
  - Density: 2,400.4/sq mi (926.79/km^{2})
- Time zone: UTC-5 (EST)
  - Summer (DST): UTC-4 (EDT)
- ZIP Code: 12205
- Area code: 518
- FIPS code: 36-17332
- GNIS feature ID: 0947179
- Wikimedia Commons: Colonie, New York
- Website: colonievillage.org

Colonie is a village in Albany County, New York, United States. The population was 7,793 at the 2010 census.

The village of Colonie is within the town of Colonie. Both are north of the city of Albany, the capital of New York.

== History ==
The village of Colonie was incorporated on March 2, 1921, and was barely developed beyond anything more than buildings along the Albany-Schenectady Road (NY Route 5).

The village fire department was established in 1931.

== Geography ==
According to the United States Census Bureau, the village has a total area of 3.3 square miles (8.6 km^{2})of which 3.3 square miles (8.5 km^{2}) is land and 0.30% is water.

== Demographics ==
Historical population
Census	Pop.	Note	%±
1930	1,176		—
1940	1,407		19.6%
1950	2,068		47.0%
1960	6,992		238.1%
1970	8,701		24.4%
1980	8,869		1.9%
1990	8,019		−9.6%
2000	7,916		−1.3%
2010	7,793		−1.6%
2020	7,781		−0.2%
U.S. Decennial Census

At the 2000 census, there were 7,916 people, 3,174 households, and 2,253 families living in the village. The population density was 2,396.7 inhabitants per square mile (925.4/km^{2}). There were 3,264 housing units at an average density of 988.2 units per square mile (381.5 units/km^{2}). The racial makeup of the village was 91.68% White, 3.54% Black or African American, 0.09% Native American, 3.08% Asian, 0.03% Pacific Islander, 0.43% from other races, and 1.16% from two or more races. Hispanic or Latino of any race were 1.59% of the population.

Of the 3,174 households 27.8% had children under the age of 18 living with them, 56.4% were married couples living together, 10.6% had a female householder with no husband present, and 29.0% were non-families. 23.3% of households were one person and 9.4% were one person aged 65 or older. The average household size was 2.49 and the average family size was 2.95.

The age distribution was 21.6% under the age of 18, 6.7% from 18 to 24, 27.6% from 25 to 44, 26.8% from 45 to 64, and 17.3% 65 or older. The median age was 41 years. For every 100 females, there were 93.5 males. For every 100 females age 18 and over, there were 89.6 males.

The median household income was $54,597 and the median family income was $63,822. Males had a median income of $38,515 versus $30,929 for females. The per capita income for the village was $23,596. About 2.5% of families and 3.9% of the population were below the poverty line, including 3.3% of those under age 18 and 4.2% of those age 65 or over.

== Education ==
The village is in the South Colonie Central School District.
