= Colonie, New York =

Town in New York, United States

- Town
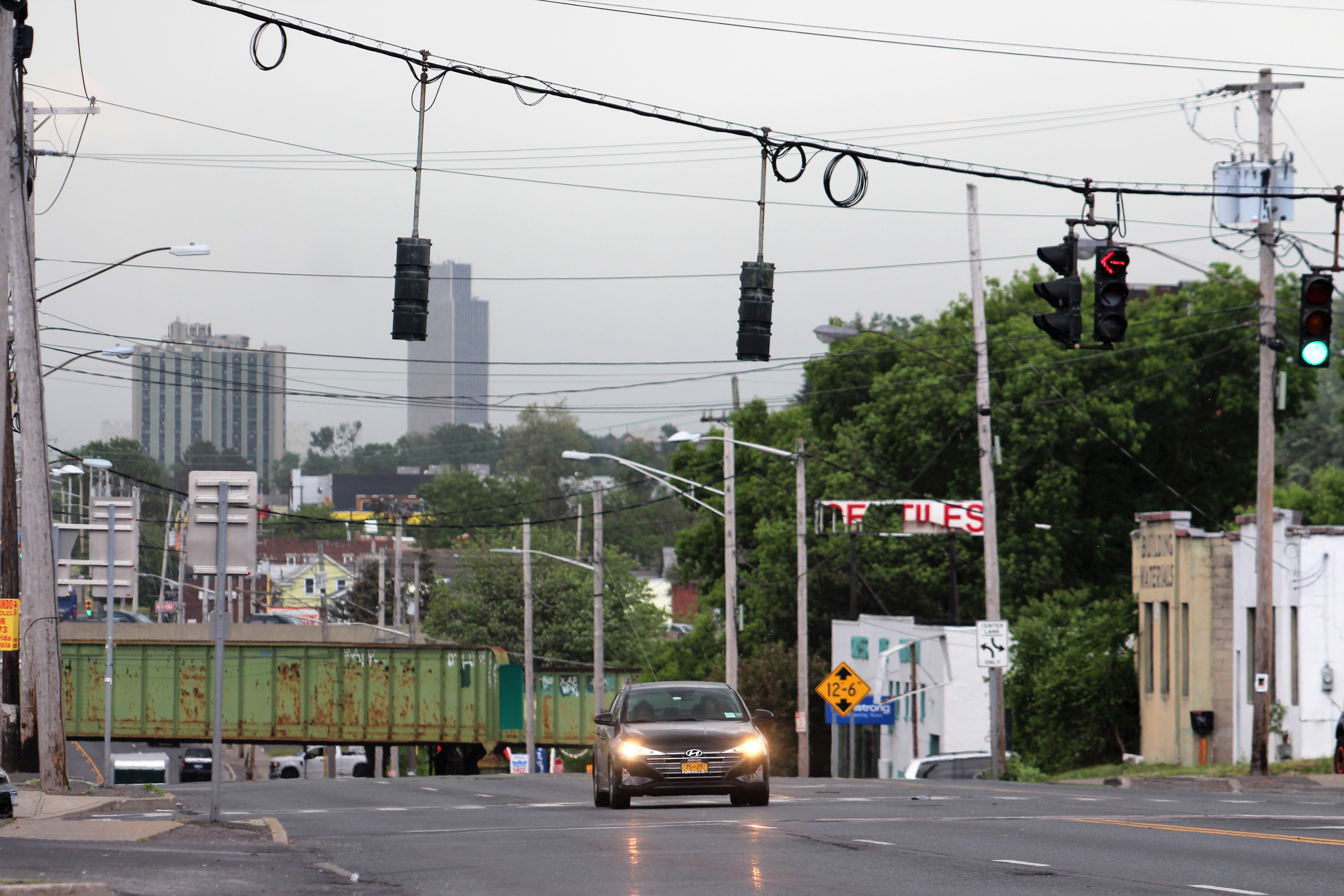
- Central Avenue in Roessleville, Colonie

- Seal
- Etymology: From Dutch Colonie meaning a colony, referring to the Colony of Rensselaerswyck surrounding Albany
- Location in Albany County and the state of New York.

- Location of New York in the United States
- Coordinates: 42°43′10″N 73°45′22″W
- Country: United States
- State: New York
- County: Albany
- Incorporation as town: 1895

Government
  - Town Supervisor: Peter G. Crummey (R) Town Council: Kristen Blais (R); Frederick J. Field (R); Alvin Gamble (D); Julian Kovacs(D); Mark McCumber (R); Joel Weingarten (D)

Area
  - Total: 57.84 sq mi (149.81 km^{2})
  - Land: 55.95 sq mi (144.90 km^{2})
  - Water: 1.90 sq mi (4.91 km^{2})
- Elevation: 344 ft (105 m)
- Highest elevation (Locust Lane Loudonville): 413 ft (126 m)
- Lowest elevation (sea level): 0 ft (0 m)

Population (2020)
  - Total: 85,590
  - Density: 1,529.9/sq mi (590.68/km^{2})
- Time zone: UTC−5 (EST)
  - Summer (DST): UTC−4 (EDT)
- ZIP Codes: 12047 (Cohoes); 12110 (Latham); 12189 (Watervliet); 12204 (Menands); 12205 (Colonie); 12211 (Loudonville); 12303, 12304 (Schenectady); 12309 (Niskayuna)
- Area codes: 518, 838
- FIPS code: 36-001-17343
- FIPS code: 36-17343
- GNIS feature ID: 0978853
- Wikimedia Commons: Colonie, New York
- Website: Town of Colonie

Colonie /ˌkɒləˈniː/ is a town in Albany County, New York, United States. It is the most-populous suburb of Albany, and is the third-largest town in area in Albany County, occupying approximately 11% of the county. Several hamlets and two villages (one also named Colonie, and Menands) exist within the town. As of the 2020 census, the town had a total population of 85,590.

The name is derived from the Dutch Colonye or "Colonie", derived from the Colonie of Rensselaerswyck. All the land outside the Village of Beverwyck (now Albany) was referred to as the "Colonie". The town of Colonie is north of Albany and is at the northern border of the county.

== History ==
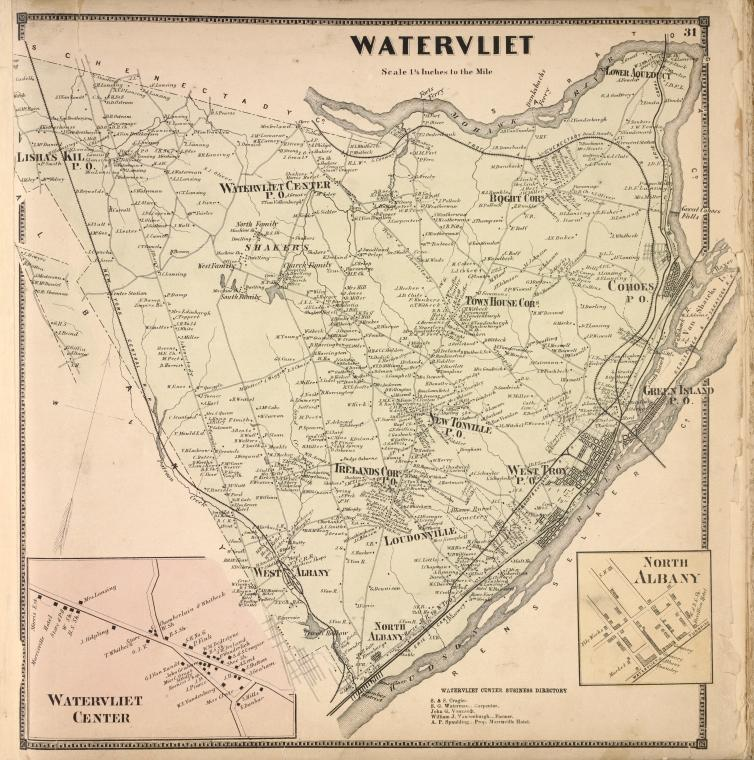
Town of Watervliet in 1866

This area was once part of the Rensselaerwyck manor. The town of Colonie was formed in 1895 after the rural residents of the town of Watervliet opposed the state's proposal to transform the entire town into the city of Watervliet. The town and village of Green Island was also split off as a town from the town of Watervliet a year later and the village of West Troy that remained became the current city of Watervliet. All debts from the original town were divided proportionally between Green Island, Watervliet, and Colonie. Several lawsuits worked their way through the court system from the results of division. The original town of Watervliet was the "mother of towns" in Albany County, having once been all the land outside of the city of Albany within the county. All current towns either were formed directly or indirectly from a town formed from Watervliet. The central part of the town was once the location of the extensive Shaker community farms. The Watervliet Shaker Historic District is located in Colonie. Much of that land is now occupied by the Albany International Airport.

Through to the 1930s, Colonie was a simple series of extensive farms and a few hamlets. However, in the post-war years, there was intensive suburban development, originally on the corridor that connected Albany and Schenectady, but quickly following throughout the entire township. By 1980, suburban development had saturated the community. At the same time, there were large highways (I-87, I-787, US Rt. 9 and NY Rt. 7) constructed which drastically changed the nature of the town and life there. The Colonie of the 1990s and beyond has become an entirely-different community from the town of the 1930s and 1940s.

The Casparus F. Pruyn House at Newtonville is open to the public as the historical and cultural arts center for the Town of Colonie.

== Historic sites ==
A number of sites in Colonie are included on the U.S. National Register of Historic Places, including -

- Albany Rural Cemetery
- Bacon-Stickney House
- Senator William T. Byrne House
- Frederick Cramer House
- Martin Dunsbach House
- Royal K. Fuller House
- Goodrich School
- Isaac M. Haswell House
- Hedge Lawn
- Henry-Remsen House
- Ebenezer Hills Jr. Farmhouse
- Friend Humphrey House
- John Wolf Kemp House
- John V. A. Lansing Farmhouse and Billsen Cemetery and Archeological Site
- George H. Lawton House
- Louis Menand House
- Menands Manor
- Reformed Dutch Church of Rensselaer in Watervliet
- Alfred H. Renshaw House
- Simmons Stone House
- Jedediah Strong House
- Treemont Manor
- Turner Farm House
- George Trimble House
- Van Denbergh-Simmons House
- Watervliet Shaker Historic District

== Geography ==
According to the United States Census Bureau, the town has a total area of 57.9 square miles (149.9 km^{2}), of which 56.1 square miles (145.2 km^{2}) is land and 1.8 square miles (4.7 km^{2}) (3.11%) is water.

The northern town line borders Schenectady County, and Saratoga County, marked by the Mohawk River. The eastern town boundary is the border of Rensselaer County, marked by the Hudson River. The town lies near the junction of the Hudson and the Mohawk rivers.

Interstate 87, Interstate 787, Interstate 90, and U.S. Route 9 pass through the town. State routes 2, 5, 7, 32, and 155 are also important arterials within the town.

== Demographics ==
Colonie Historical Populations
Census	Pop.	Note	%±
1810	1,406		—
1900	7,035		—
1910	8,385		19.2%
1920	10,196		21.6%
1930	17,436		71.0%
1940	20,631		18.3%
1950	29,522		43.1%
1960	52,760		78.7%
1970	69,147		31.1%
1980	74,593		7.9%
1990	76,497		2.6%
2000	79,258		3.6%
2010	81,591		2.9%
2020	85,590		4.9%
2023 (est.)	85,591	▲	0.0%

As of the census of 2000, there were 79,258 people, 30,980 households, and 20,539 families residing in the town. The population density was 1,413.6 inhabitants per square mile (545.8/km^{2}). There were 32,280 housing units at an average density of 575.7 per square mile (222.3/km^{2}). The racial makeup of the town was 90.55% White, 3.96% Black or African American, 0.15% Native American, 3.59% Asian, 0.02% Pacific Islander, 0.61% from other races, and 1.13% from two or more races. Hispanic or Latino of any race were 1.86% of the population.

There were 30,980 households, out of which 29.2% had children under the age of 18 living with them, 53.3% were married couples living together, 9.6% had a female householder with no husband present, and 33.7% were non-families. Of all households, 28.1% were made up of individuals, and 11.1% had someone living alone who was 65 years of age or older. The average household size was 2.43 and the average family size was 3.00.

In the town, the population was spread out, with 21.8% under the age of 18, 8.9% from 18 to 24, 27.8% from 25 to 44, 25.1% from 45 to 64, and 16.3% who were 65 years of age or older. The median age was 40 years. For every 100 females, there were 92.8 males. For every 100 females age 18 and over, there were 89.6 males.

The median income for a household in the town was $51,817, and the median income for a family was $62,649. Males had a median income of $41,453 versus $30,763 for females. The per capita income for the town was $25,231. About 3.0% of families and 4.7% of the population were below the poverty line, including 4.5% of those under age 18 and 6.0% of those age 65 or over.

== Politics ==
The current town supervisor is Peter G. Crummey, a Republican who was sworn in as the 18th Supervisor of the Town of Colonie on January 1, 2022. Crummey received 55 percent of the vote while his opponent, Democrat Kelly Mateja, received 45 percent, a difference of 2,407 votes. Crummey ran unopposed in the 2023 election, being reelected with 14,295 votes.

Crummey's election marked a change in political power at the Supervisor's position from Democrat to Republican. The outgoing town supervisor Paula Mahan, a Democrat, chose not to seek an eighth two-year term. Mahan was elected to her first term in November 2007, defeating long-time Republican incumbent Mary Brizzell. In November 2009, Mahan was re-elected to a second term, defeating former Republican Albany County Executive/former New York State Senator Michael J. Hoblock. In November 2011, Mahan was re-elected to a third term, defeating former New York State Department of Environmental Conservation Commissioner and the former Director of the town's Planning and Economic Development Committee, Denise Sheehan, by less than 400 votes. She was re-elected in 2013 to a fourth term by defeating political newcomer Todd A. Drake.

The town board has six members, with four-year terms; three members are elected every odd-numbered year. The Town Supervisor also serves as a member of the town board.

According to the April 1, 2018, NYS Board of Elections Party Affiliation and Status of active and inactive registered voters in the Town of Colonie, there are approximately 21,000 registered Democrats and 16,000 registered Republicans out of a total of 56,500 registered voters in the 61 election districts within the town.

The seat of Colonie's government is Colonie Memorial Town Hall, located on U.S. Route 9 in Newtonville, near Siena College. The town courts, police department, and emergency medical services department are located at the Public Safety Building on Wolf Road near Albany International Airport.

== Public safety ==
Law enforcement in the town is primarily provided by the Town of Colonie Police Department; within the village of Menands, which occupies the southeastern corner of the town, there is the Village of Menands Police Department as well. However, that law enforcement is supplemented by the New York State Police Troop G (the headquarters of which lies within the town of Colonie) and the Albany County Sheriff's Office, which patrols the Albany International Airport and operates the Albany County Correctional Facilities (which also lie within the town of Colonie).

In November 2007, the town of Colonie was ranked the sixth safest place to live in a Morgan Quitno Publishing study of crime rates across the United States. By November 2009 CQ Press (formerly known as Morgan Quitno Publishing) ranked the town of Colonie with the lowest crime rate of all communities in the United States with a population of at least 75,000 residents. The town held the top spot again in 2010 and has since continuously ranked at the top 10 or better for having the lowest crime rate of all communities in the United States with a population of at least 75,000 residents.

Emergency Medical Service (advanced, basic, and transport) in the town is primarily provided by the Town of Colonie Emergency Medical Services (EMS) Department. The EMS Department operates out of six ambulance stations scattered throughout the town of Colonie to facilitate the most rapid response. The EMS Department also serves as an integral part of any heavy or light technical rescue operations in the town. In 1999, the town of Colonie Emergency Medical Services Department was awarded the National Association of Emergency Medical Technicians' National Paramedic Service of the Year Award. The award is given to one service of high distinction that has demonstrated excellence, innovation and community service.

On May 4, 2010, the town of Colonie was awarded the 2010 International Association of Fire Chiefs' "Heartsafe Community" award for making significant advances in emergency cardiac care. On August 28, 2010, the New York State EMS Council awarded the town of Colonie Emergency Medical Services Department the New York State "EMS Agency of the Year" award.

Firefighting service in the town is primarily provided by one of twelve (mostly volunteer) firefighting agencies and one paid fire brigade. (See also Administrative divisions of New York.)

- Five Fire Districts (Boght Community, Midway, Schuyler Heights, Verdoy, and West Albany).
- One Joint Fire District (Stanford Heights [Niskayuna & Colonie]).
- Four Fire Protection Districts (Fuller Road, Latham, Maplewood, and Shaker Road-Loudonville).
- Two Village Fire Departments (Colonie and Menands).

These agencies encompass seventeen fire stations, two small rescue boats (Boght & Verdoy), seven ladder trucks (Fuller Road, Latham, Menands, Midway, Schuyler Heights, Shaker Road-Loudonville, Stanford Heights, and Verdoy), one Hazardous Materials Specialty Rescue (West Albany), one Trench/Structural Collapse Specialty Rescue (Village of Colonie), one Confined Space Specialty Rescue (Latham), eight General/Light Rescue apparatus, 23 full-size pumpers, a small number of attack pumpers, and a small number of EMS First-Response vehicles.

- One Paid Fire Brigade

The Albany International Airport Fire Brigade consists of a full-time paid crash/fire/rescue staff, three crash/rescue vehicles, a mini pumper, hazmat truck, foam re-supply truck, and a full-size pumper. However, the airport's fire units stay on Airport Authority property most of the time, and are housed in yet another fire station that is on the Airport Authority's property. Occasionally, the Airport Fire Brigade responds to mutual aid requests with the bordering Shaker Road-Loudonville Fire Department, as well as other fire agencies within the town of Colonie and Albany County.

- Also located in the town of Colonie is a New York sponsored Urban Search and Rescue (USAR) Team, New York Task Force 2 (NY-TF2). NY-TF2 (then known as the New York Regional Response Team-1 {NYRRT-1}) was the first USAR team on site immediately following the attacks on, and collapse of, the World Trade Center on September 11, 2001, since many members of NY-TF1 (based in New York City) were members of the FDNY that perished in the collapse. Those same members provided much of the initial training to NY-TF2.

== Education ==
There are six public school districts that serve the town of Colonie: the South Colonie Central School District, North Colonie Central Schools, Watervliet City School District, Menands Union Free School District, Niskayuna Central School District, and Mohonasen Central School District.

South Colonie (Colonie Central High School) serves much of the western part of the town, including West Albany, the village of Colonie, and a small part of the adjoining town of Niskayuna. North Colonie (Shaker High School) serves Latham and the smaller, suburban and rural hamlets to the north of Latham, as well as most of Loudonville and Newtonville. The Watervliet City School District (Watervliet Junior-Senior High School) serves some students from Menands and the Schuyler Heights area. Mohonasen's (Mohonasen High School) schools serve the sliver of Colonie which lies south of the Amtrak tracks and east of its border with the Town of Rotterdam. Niskayuna Central School District's boundaries enter Colonie for the short segment of Vly Rd. east of Denison Rd., and the few streets along this stretch. The Menands Union Free School District is a single building school district serving the village of Menands and educates students from kindergarten through eighth grade. Upon completion of eighth grade, Menands Union Free School District students choose whether to attend Shaker High School, Colonie Central High School, Watervliet, Heatly Junior-Senior High School in Green Island, or Tech Valley High School in Albany. In 2008, the Maplewood-Colonie Common School District merged with, and into the North Colonie School District.

The town of Colonie is also home to the Christian Brothers Academy, as well as several private and/or religious elementary schools. Siena College is located in the hamlet of Loudonville. Bryant & Stratton College, a proprietary college, is in the town of Colonie. Colonie was formerly home to a campus of ITT Technical Institute,

== Recreation ==
The Town of Colonie operates and maintains over 850 acres of property and facilities, including the 130-acre Crossings Park, the 160-acre Mohawk River Park and Pool, the 12-acre Mohawk Riverside Landing Park, the 36-hole Town of Colonie Golf Course, the 43-acre Schuyler Flatts Cultural Park, a 5.5 mile section of the Mohawk Hudson Bike/Hike Trail, and other sports facilities and pocket parks.

== Media ==
There are two dedicated weekly newspapers for parts of the town, the Colonie Spotlight and Loudonville Spotlight. Also, Channel 9 on Spectrum News in the town is a public-access television station devoted to town news, programming, and events. The studios are located inside the William K. Sanford town library on Albany Shaker Road.

Although not entirely dedicated to the town of Colonie, the headquarters and distribution center for the Capital Region's major daily newspaper, the Times Union (owned by the Hearst Corporation), lies within the town.

== Communities and locations ==
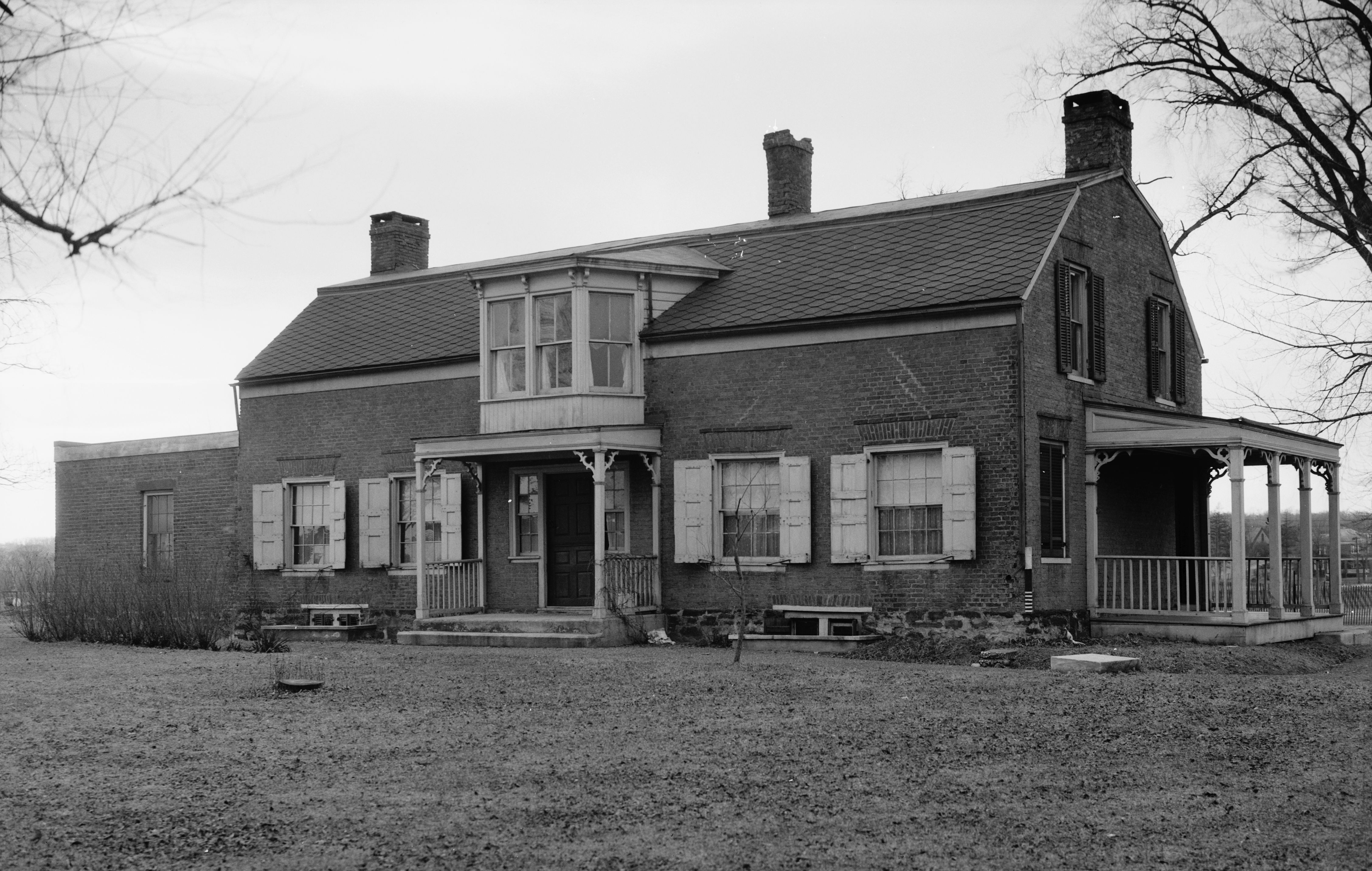
Philip Schuyler house

- Albany International Airport (ALB)—An airport servicing Albany and the Capital District.
- Boght Corners—A hamlet in the northeastern part of the town.
- Colonie—An incorporated village in the southern part of the town.
- Crescent Station—A hamlet at the northernmost point of the town.
- Karner—A hamlet southwest of the village of Colonie.
- Dunsbach Ferry—A hamlet in the northwestern part of the town at the Mohawk River.
- Latham—A hamlet near the center of the town.
- Lisha Kill—A hamlet in the northwestern section of town, on Central Ave (NY Route 5).
- Loudonville—A suburban hamlet near the Albany city line.
- Mannsville—Part of the Schuyler Heights Fire District and Watervliet City School District.
- Maplewood—A hamlet adjacent to Cohoes, Watervliet and Green Island.
- Maywood—A hamlet northwest of the Village of Colonie on Central Ave/ NY Route 5.
- Menands—An incorporated village in the eastern part of the town.
- Newtonville—A hamlet between Latham and Loudonville.
- Schuyler Heights—A hamlet north of Menands; south and west of Watervliet; east of Loudonville; lying on the west bank of the Hudson River. Part of the Schuyler Heights Fire District and Watervliet City School District and North Colonie School District.
- Roessleville—A suburban community near the city line of Albany.
- Shakers—A settlement southwest of Albany International Airport.
- Stanford Heights—A hamlet on the western edge of town, along the Schenectady County line.
- Verdoy—A hamlet north of Albany International Airport.
- West Albany—A hamlet on the southern edge of the town, along the Albany city line.

== Notable people ==
- John H. Fenimore V, Adjutant General of New York, raised in Newtonville.
- Robert Prentiss, Massachusetts and New York (state) politician, lived in Colonie.
- Leland Stanford, born in Colonie in 1824, at which time it was known as Watervliet
