= Mannsville, Albany County, New York =

Mannsville, Albany County Mannville
- Hamlet
- Location within New York Location within the United States
- Coordinates: 42°43′30″N 73°42′42″W
- Country: United States
- State: New York
- Region: Capital District
- County: Albany
- Town: Colonie
- Settled: 1875
- Named after: Francis N. Mann

Area
  - Total: 0.029 sq mi (0.075 km^{2})

Population (1998)
  - Total: 175 (approx.)
  - Density: 6,000/sq mi (2,300/km^{2})
- Time zone: UTC-5 (EST)
  - Summer (DST): UTC-4 (EDT)
- ZIP Code: 12189 (Watervliet)
- Area code: 518

Mannsville is a hamlet within the town of Colonie, Albany County, New York, United States. It is a small community west of the city of Watervliet and is inaccessible to the rest of Colonie by car without driving through Watervliet. Town historian Jean Olton stated in 1987 that Mannsville was no longer considered "an official hamlet" of the town of Colonie. As of 2019, Mannsville (misspelled as Mansville) is listed on the town of Colonie's Town Historian website as an unincorporated community within the town.

== History ==
In 1875, Francis N. Mann purchased most of what is now Mannsville from John Schuyler. Mann was a judge in the town of Watervliet (not to be confused with the neighboring city of Watervliet). He died a few months later, and his children—Francis N. Mann Jr., Elias P. Mann and Emily Mann—inherited the land. In 1905 they moved to England without disposing of the land or arranging for the property taxes to be paid. Albany County eventually foreclosed, auctioning the land off in lots, leading to a boom in new housing in the 1970s.

In 1998, the neighboring city of Watervliet attempted to annex the small hamlet, which at that time consisted of roughly 175 inhabitants. Colonie Town Supervisor Mary Brizzell stated the pros for staying with Colonie as lower taxes, access to the town golf course, youth services, and community development grant money. Watervliet Mayor Robert Carlson put forth in favor of annexation the facts that emergency and fire response times would improve, the city provides municipal garbage pick up, does not charge a fire district tax (Colonie does), the children of Mannsville already attend the Watervliet City School District, and most residents attend Watervliet churches.

== Geography ==
Mannsville is roughly 18.5 acres (75,000 m^{2}) in area. Mannsville is generally understood to be bordered on the south by NY Route 155; on the north by 15th Street and the Watervliet city line; on the east by Elbow Alley, which runs between Eighth and Ninth Avenues and Watervliet city line; and on the west by railroad tracks. Mannsville is flat and of low elevation. Since, 1995 residents have complained of frequent flooding due partly to beaver dams on the Kromma Kill and to increased residential construction uphill and upstream from the hamlet.
