= The Crossings Park =

Public park in Colonie, New York, United States

Coordinates: 42.718°N 73.792°W

The Crossings Park is located in the Town of Colonie, New York, outside of Albany. Crossings Park is a 130-acre public park to which tourists come to visit every day. The park has bike and running paths that stretch and connect up to 6.5 total miles, as well as a 3-acre pond located in the center.

The park holds festivals and farmers' markets that attract people from all across New York. The park maintains a big gazebo that overlooks the pond, a play park for children of all ages, a medium-sized maze, and the Rudy A. Ciccotti Center. The park is open from sunup to sundown. The Crossings Park is closed on Thanksgiving, Black Friday, Christmas Eve, Christmas, New Year's Eve, and New Year's Day.

== History ==
In 2003, The Crossings was officially opened to the public. The land was bought from a small farm owner on Albany Shaker Road. The remaining farm property is now called "Constantine Construction and Farm". The original family that sold the land to the town still owns a small ice cream parlor that is on Constantine Farm called "Scoups Ice Cream".

== Trails ==
The park holds six and a half miles of paths for bikers, joggers, and walkers that stretch to three separate sections of the park. The "Orchard", which is at the main entrance of the park along Albany Shaker Road, offers tourists an entrance to the park that includes a wooden fence and stone columns that serve as a divider from the park to the street. The "Arboretum" offers numerous different types of trees and plants surrounded with a stone wall that is surrounding the whole "Arboretum". Lastly, the "Meadows" is an open field or pasture where walkers, bikers and joggers can roam freely and enjoy the open air. ("The Crossings of Colonie")

The Crossings has many paths and trails that go around the park's back side as well that do not include the "Orchard", "Arboretum", or "Meadows". Yellow, Blue, Green and Red are the names of these four different trails. The Yellow trail is .90 miles, Blue Trail is 1.25 miles, Green Trail is 1.50 miles, and Red Trail is 1.10 miles. The perimeter of the park is equal to 3.25 miles, for a total of 6.50 park trail miles.

== Events ==
On Saturdays from 9 am to 1 pm in May through September the Crossings holds their annual farmers market, which is one of the largest farmers' markets in the Capital Region. The park supervises over thirty vendors that sell items such as fresh fruit, picked flowers, and home-made items and baked goods.

The Crossings Park is also home to marathon races that are for charity organizations. In 2014 there was the "Race Against Lyme" marathon, the fourth annual "Rhino Run" which was a 5 km, and the seventh annual "Hometown Hero's 5k". In the past there have been marathons run to raise awareness and money for breast cancer and to support of the troops.

== Recreation ==
In the back half of the park, away from the entrance, the Crossing holds the signature recreational center called the Rudy A. Ciccotti Center. The facility holds an aquatic center which includes a two-story water slide, a 25-yard lap pool, a hot tube, a water playground for the family and children, and also its lazy river. They offer swim classes for all ages, along with birthday parties and events alike. They have 4 full basketball courts, a full gym filled with free weights and machines, and lastly two running tracks that overlook the basketball courts. The Ciccotti Center is not free and you need a paid membership to use the weights and machines. The Rudy A. Ciccotti center also offers non-physical activities also such as nutrition services and massage therapy.

In the Crossings Park there is a full, wheelchair-accessible playground from which children tend to play on day in and day out. The playground is made up of four sets of swing sets, a sand pit, slides and a massive jungle gym. There is a maze located right beside the playground that enables children to play in whenever they choose.

== Other ==
The Crossings Park also plays home to some other service opportunities that local kids in the neighboring school districts can get involved in. The Colonie Youth is a program where kids from three school districts meet at the Crossings to talk about and perform community service activities. This organization has performed tasks that have benefited many fields of need. One in particular was the Support Our Troops where they sent a care package to the troops overseas during spring season.

The park is also a meeting place for prom and homecoming pictures for the local high school dances. Schools across the capital region gather here before their dance to get pictures with the pond and scenery in the background.

The park is used as the home cross country course for Siena College's cross country team. The Crossings has held the Metro Atlantic Athletic Conference tournament for both men's and women's cross country twice, doing so in 2018 and in 2022.
