= Mohonasen Central School District =

School district in the U.S. state of New York

Location
- Rotterdam, New York, United States

District information
- Type: Public
- Grades: K-12
- Superintendent: Shannon Shine
- Schools: 4
- Budget: $55,780,000

Students and staff
- Students: 2,850
- District mascot: Native American Warriors

Other information
- Website: mohonasen.org

The Mohonasen Central School District (also known as the Rotterdam-Mohonasen Central School District) is a public school district in New York State. Located in Schenectady County and services 2,850 students mostly from the town of Rotterdam and also draws in students from the towns of Colonie and Guilderland in Albany County. The district has a student to teacher ratio of 13:1

== Schools ==
Elementary schools

- Bradt Primary School (K-2)
- Pinewood Intermediate School (3-5)

Middle School (6-8)

- Draper Middle School

High School (9-12)

- Mohonasen High School

== Board of education ==
The Board of Education election is held annually on the third Tuesday of May, alongside the district's annual budget vote.

=== Current Board Members ===
- Wade Abbott, President
- Stacy MacTurk, Vice President
- Lisa Gaglioti
- Ericka Montagino
- Julie Power
- Melissa Laudano
- Chad Mcfarland
- Allyssa Zito
