= Robert Prentiss =

American politician (1936–2022)

Robert G. Prentiss (March 23, 1936 – March 18, 2022) was an American politician.

Prentiss was born in Pittsfield, Massachusetts, and graduated from Pittsfield High School. He then served in the United States Marines Corps during the Korean War. Prentiss graduated from University of Massachusetts with a bachelor's degree in government and his master's degree from University of Iowa. He was a journalist in Massachusetts and served on the Pittsfield City Council. Prentiss moved to Colonie, New York and then lived in Voorheesville, New York. He served on the Albany County, New York Legislature. Prentiss then served in the New York State Assembly from 1994 to 2004. While living in New York, he was a Republican and then switched to the Democratic Party. Prentiss was a Democrat when he was living in Massachusetts. Prentiss died at his home in Voorheesville, New York, after suffering from Alzheimer's disease.
