= Colonie Central High School =

School in Colonie, New York, US

Location
- One Raider Boulevard; Colonie, (Albany County), NY 12205; 42.708526°N 73.810216°W

Information
- Funding type: Public
- School district: South Colonie Central School District
- NCES District ID: 3627210
- CEEB code: 330055
- NCES School ID: 362721003704.
- Principal: William Behrle
- Faculty: 121.66 (on an FTE basis)
- Grades: 9 - 12
- Enrollment: 1,526 (2019-20)
- Student to teacher ratio: 12.54
- Colors: Garnet and gold
- Mascot: The Wolfpack
- Team name: Garnet Raiders
- Rival: Shaker High School
- Feeder schools: Sand Creek Middle School, Lisha Kill Middle School
- Website: cchs.southcolonieschools.org

Colonie Central High School is a public high school in the town of Colonie, with the postal address of Albany, New York. In 2005 it had 2225 students and 132 classroom teachers. It is part of the South Colonie Central School District. The building principal was Christopher Robilotti until the 2020–2021 school year when Thomas Kachadurian was promoted.

== Academics ==
Colonie High School offers Advanced Placement (AP) courses in numerous disciplines. In addition, the high school, in conjunction with nearby Hudson Valley Community College, offers several "College in High School courses", in which students can earn college credits for classes taken in the high school. Colonie also has a large technology department, where students can take all of the courses in the Project Lead the Way engineering sequence. Also, the school offers credits from SUNY Albany, RIT and College of St. Rose. Three foreign languages are taught at the school, including Spanish, French and Italian.

== Notable alumni ==
- Tony Rossi (b. 1943), college baseball coach
- Michael Nolin (b. 1948), film producer, writer, director, executive, Savannah college of Art and Design professor
- Jason Bittner (b. 1970), drummer, Shadows Fall
- Chad Dukes (b. 1971), running back for several NFL teams
- David Gamble (b. 1971), wide receiver for the Super Bowl Champion Denver Broncos
- Julia DeVillers, children's book author, book made into Disney Channel movie Read it and Weep
- Bobby Fish, (b. 1976), professional wrestler for All Elite Wrestling.
- Lucy D’Escoffier Crespo da Silva (b. 1978), MIT student and promising astronomer for whom the asteroid 96747 Crespodasilva is named. She died in 2000.
- Kristie Marano (b. 1979), Olympic wrestler
