= David Gamble (American football) =

American football player (born 1971)

No. 82
- Position: Wide receiver

Personal information
- Born: June 14, 1971 (age 55); Albany, New York
- Listed height: 6 ft 1 in (1.85 m)
- Listed weight: 190 lb (86 kg)

Career information
- High school: Colonie (NY) Central
- College: New Hampshire
- NFL draft: 1994: undrafted

Career history
- Philadelphia Eagles (1994)*; San Antonio Texans (1995–1996); Denver Broncos (1997)
- * Offseason or practice squad member only
- Stats at Pro Football Reference

David Gamble (born June 14, 1971) is a former wide receiver for the Denver Broncos. He was signed by the Broncos in 1997, and went on to win Super Bowl XXXII over the Green Bay Packers, however he was released in 1998 to clear roster space.

== Football career ==
In May 1994, the Philadelphia Eagles signed David as a free agent. He was released during preseason and then signed with the San Antonio Texans of the Canadian Football League. He played there for two seasons before getting an opportunity to play in the NFL. From April 1996 to July 1998, he played for the Denver Broncos of the National Football League. During his tenure, he played backup receiver and was a significant contributor on special teams. David was a member of the 1998 Super Bowl Championship Team. David's professional football career ended in November 1998 after one season as wide receiver and special teams player for the Winnipeg Blue Bombers of the Canadian Football League.

He was assistant coach for the Siena College football program from 1999 to 2002.
