= Dr. Wesley Blaisdell House =

Historic house in New York, United States

- U.S. National Register of Historic Places
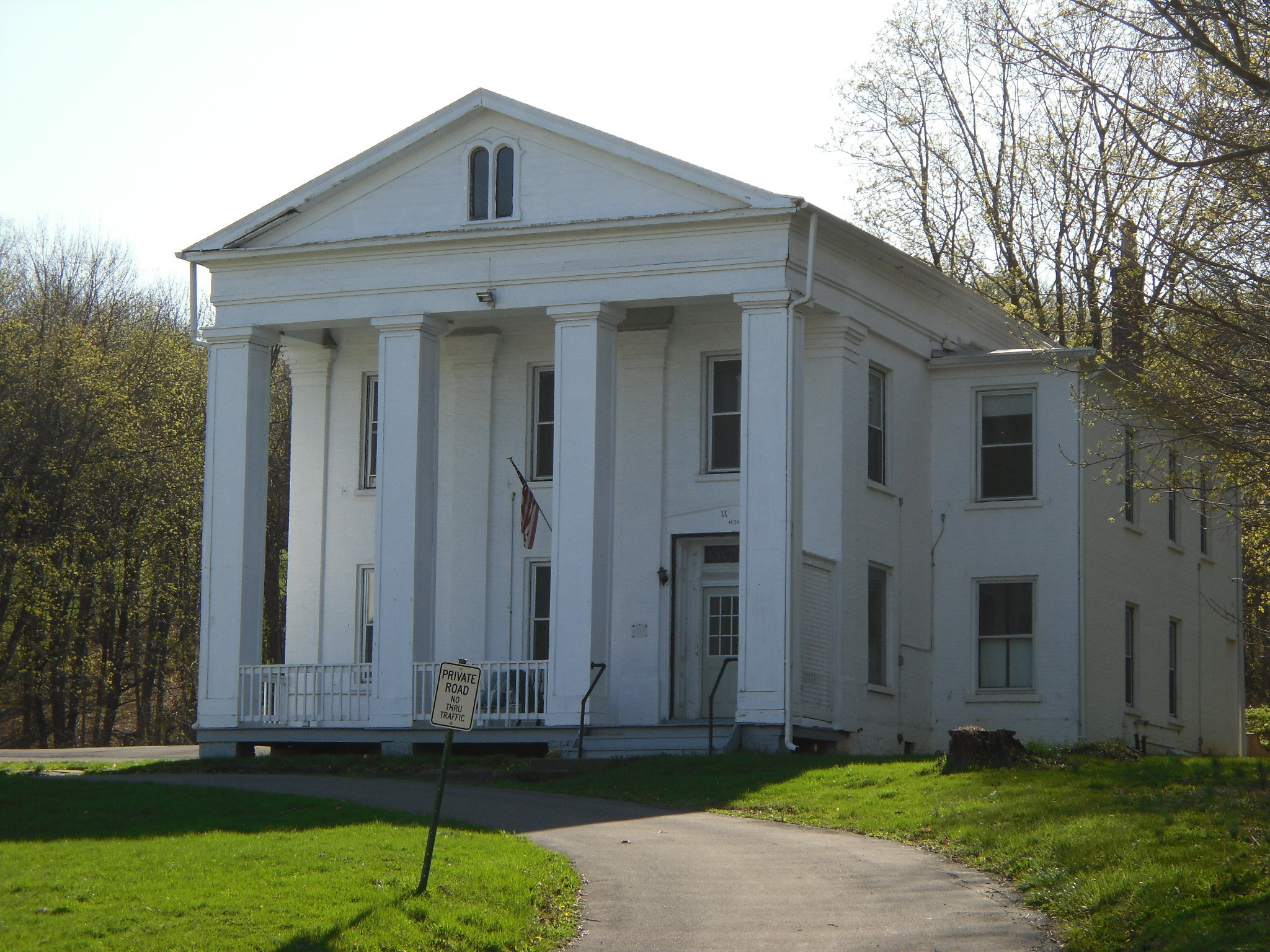
- Dr. Wesley Blaisdell House, April 2010

- Location within New York Location within the United States
- Location: S. Main St., Coeymans Landing, New York
- Coordinates: 42°28′20″N 73°47′35″W
- Area: 1.9 acres (0.77 ha)
- Built: 1838
- Architectural style: Greek Revival
- NRHP reference No.: 12000418
- Added to NRHP: July 17, 2012

The Dr. Wesley Blaisdell House (also known as the John Colvin Home) is a historic house located on South Main Street in Coeymans Landing, Albany County, New York.

== Description and history ==
It was built in 1838, and is a 2 1/2-story, three bay by three bay, Greek Revival style frame dwelling with a side hall plan. It has a temple front with a monumental two-story portico and picturesque two-story bay window added in the 1850s.

It was listed on the National Register of Historic Places on July 17, 2012.
