= Frederick Cramer House =

Historic house in New York, United States

- U.S. National Register of Historic Places
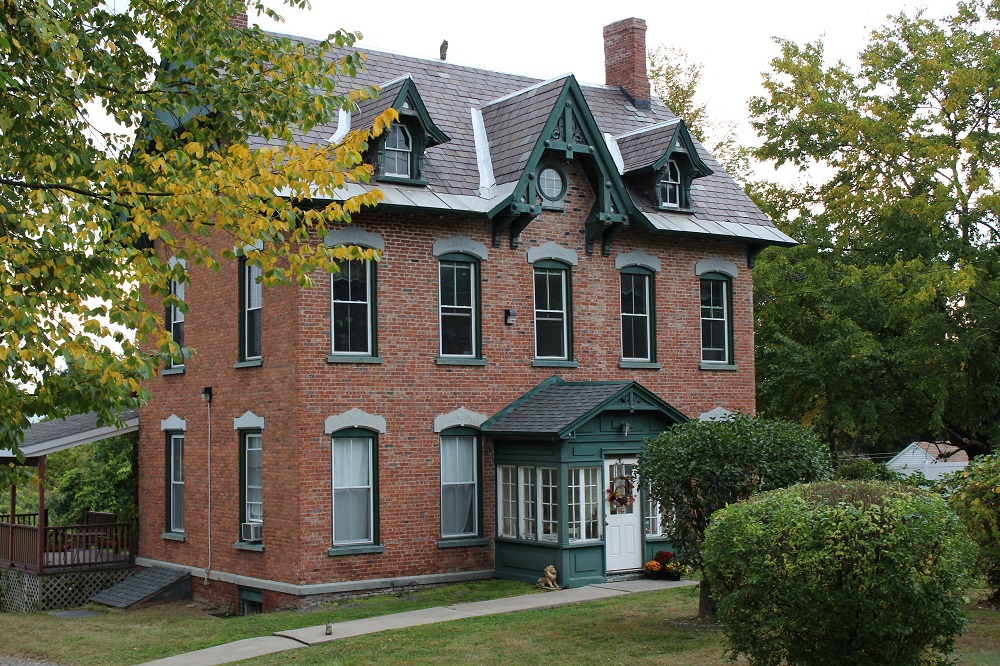

- Location within New York Location within the United States
- Location: 410 Albany-Shaker Rd., Colonie, New York
- Coordinates: 42°41′53″N 73°46′12″W
- Area: 4 acres (1.6 ha)
- Built: 1877
- Architect: Hoffman, Ernest
- Architectural style: Gothic
- MPS: Colonie Town MRA
- NRHP reference No.: 85002704
- Added to NRHP: October 3, 1985

Frederick Cramer House is a historic home located in Colonie in Albany County, New York. It was built in 1877 and is a 2 1/2-story brick farmhouse in the Gothic Revival style. It is a T-shaped residence with a five-bay-wide main section. It features an enclosed 1-story portico at the center entrance. The property also contains a contributing barn and shed.

It was listed on the National Register of Historic Places in 1985.
