= Goodrich School =

- U.S. National Register of Historic Places
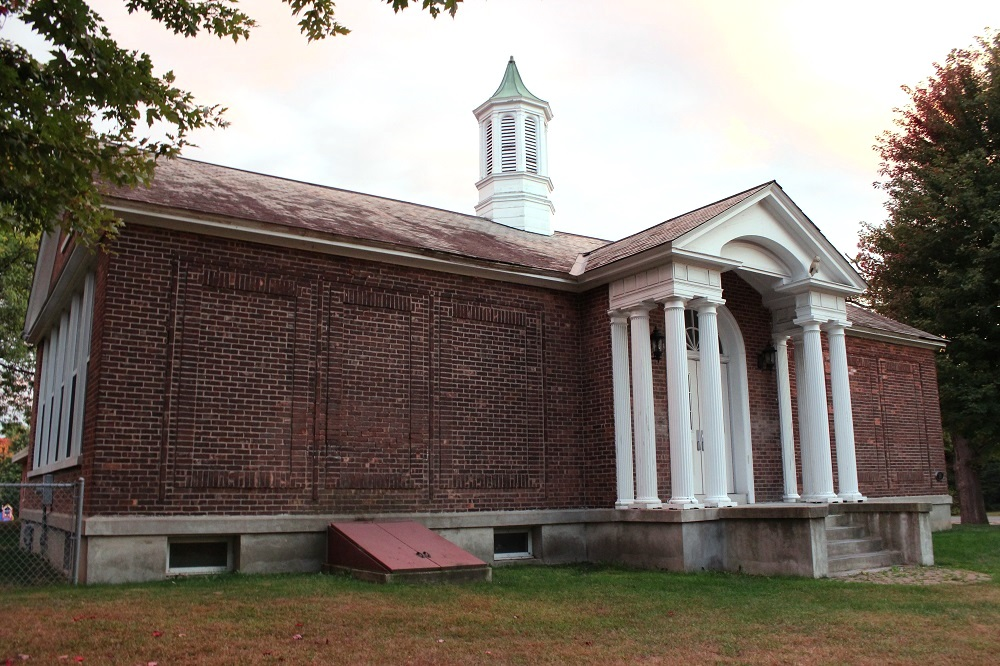
- Front of the school

- Location within New York Location within the United States
- Location: 91 Fiddlers Ln., Colonie, New York
- Coordinates: 42°43′45″N 73°44′49″W
- Area: 12.3 acres (5.0 ha)
- Built: 1922
- Architectural style: Classical Revival
- NRHP reference No.: 00001156
- Added to NRHP: September 22, 2000

Goodrich School is a historic school building located in Colonie in Albany County, New York. It consists of a one-story, gable roofed rectangular brick building built about 1922 with a one-story, rectangular hipped roof wing dated to about 1926. On the south side are a series of two additions completed during the 1950s. The building is in the Classical Revival style and features a prominent portico with curved underside supported by six Doric order fluted columns. Atop the roof is an octagonal wood cupola with a copper roof.

It was listed on the National Register of Historic Places in 2000.

== Gallery ==
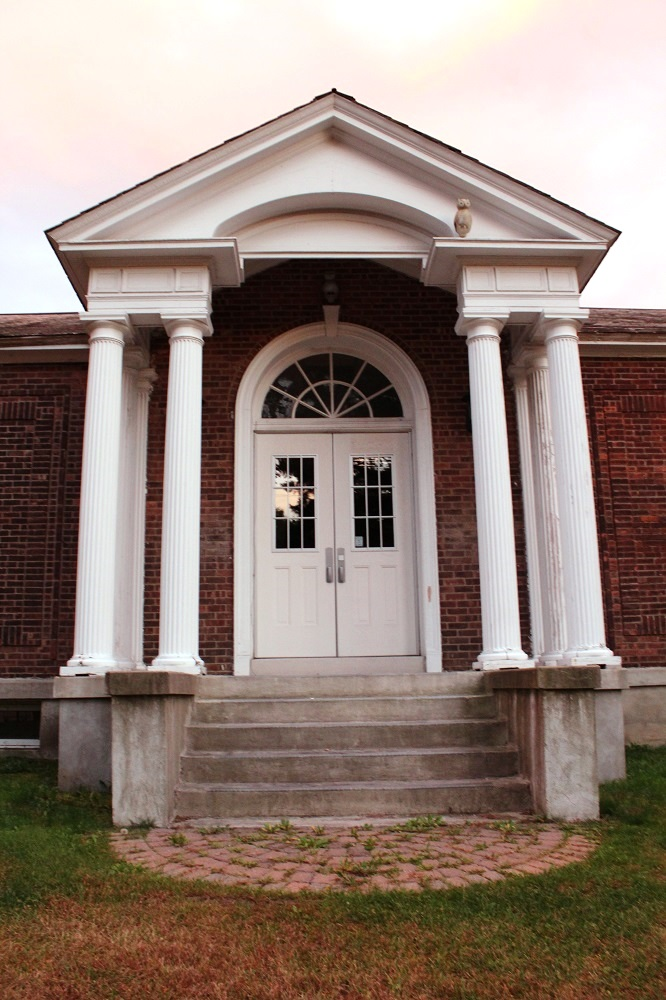
Entrance to the school

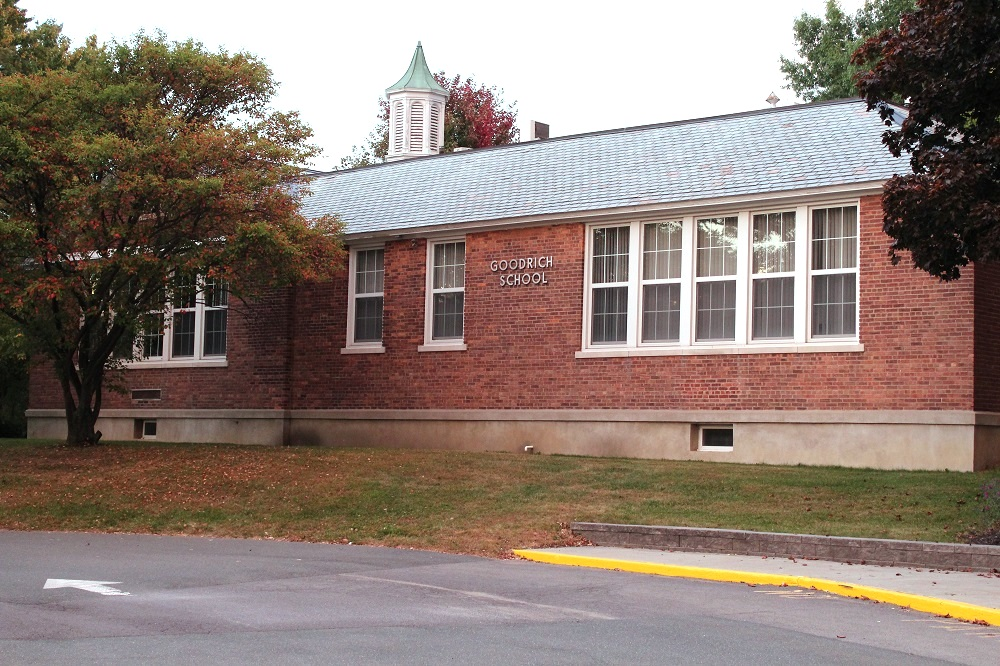
Side of the school
