= John Wolf Kemp House =

Historic house in New York, United States

- U.S. National Register of Historic Places
- Location within New York Location within the United States
- Location: 216 Wolf Rd., Colonie, New York
- Coordinates: 42°43′33″N 73°47′57″W
- Area: 3.7 acres (1.5 ha)
- Built: 1780
- Architectural style: Federal
- MPS: Colonie Town MRA
- NRHP reference No.: 85002714
- Added to NRHP: October 3, 1985

John Wolf Kemp House was a historic home located at Colonie in Albany County, New York. It was built about 1780 and was a 2-story, L-shaped frame farmhouse with a gable roof and five bays wide. It had a 1 1/2-story rear ell. It featured a 1-story hip-roofed enclosed porch over the three central bays. The entrance and side parlors have Federal-style details. Also on the property were a contributing privy and summer kitchen. The house was demolished in May 2003.

It was listed on the National Register of Historic Places in 1985.
