= Jedediah Strong House =

Historic house in New York, United States

- U.S. National Register of Historic Places
- Location within New York Location within the United States
- Location: 379 Vly Rd., Colonie, New York
- Coordinates: 42°46′01″N 73°49′41″W
- Area: 2 acres (0.81 ha)
- Built: 1795
- Architectural style: Federal
- MPS: Colonie Town MRA
- NRHP reference No.: 85002748
- Added to NRHP: October 3, 1985

Jedediah Strong House is a historic home at Colonie in Albany County, New York. Built about 1795, it is a two-story, six bay wide dwelling with two symmetrically placed end chimneys in the Federal style. It features a small entrance portico with a hipped roof and supported by square columns. Also on the property is a contributing barn.

It was listed on the National Register of Historic Places in 1985.
