= Chauncey N. Lawton House =

Historic house in Indiana, United States

- U.S. National Register of Historic Places
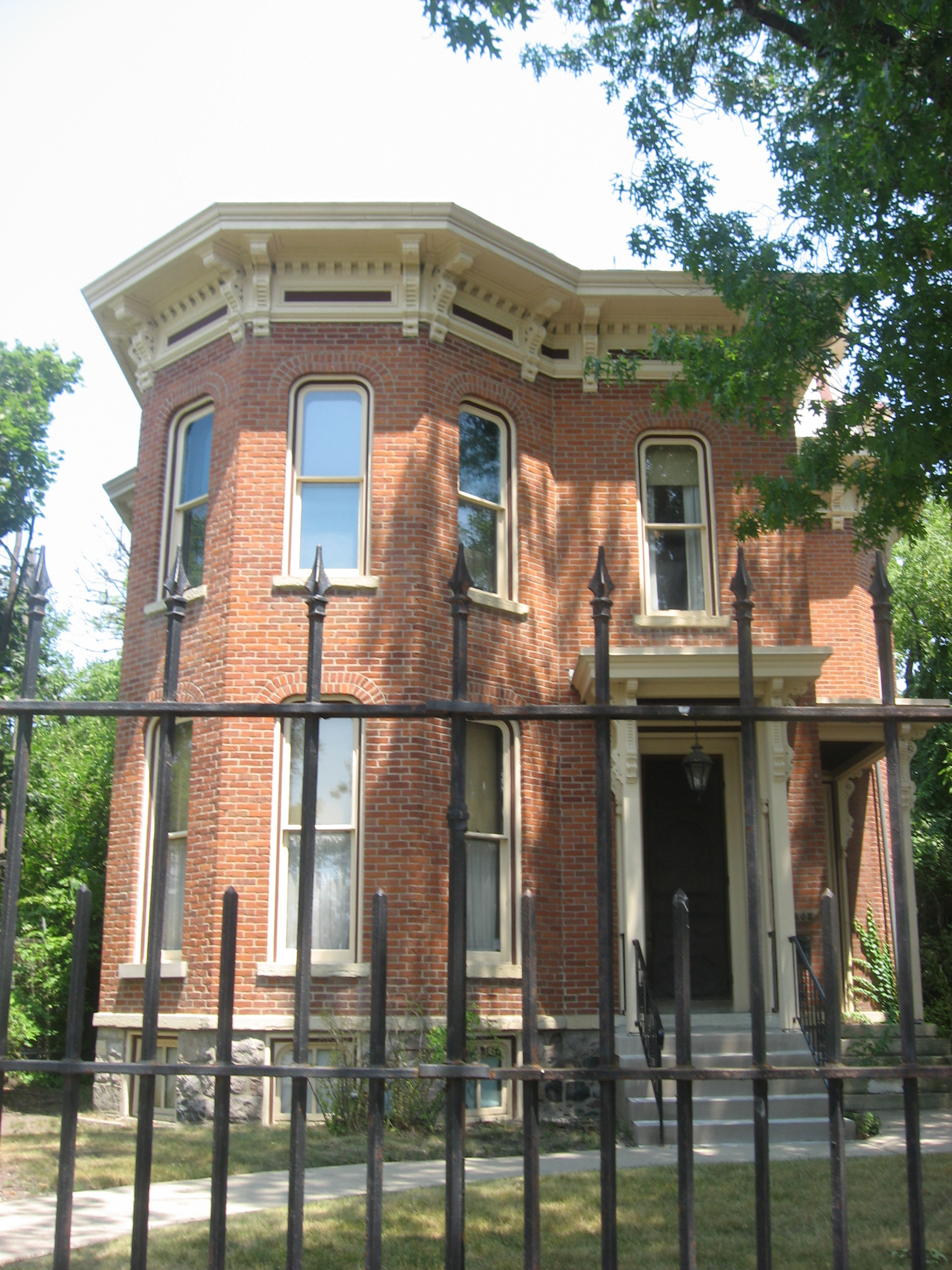
- Chauncey N. Lawton House, July 2015

- Location within Indiana Location within the United States
- Location: 405 W. Wayne St., South Bend, Indiana
- Coordinates: 41°40′26″N 86°15′17″W
- Area: less than one acre
- Built: 1872
- Architectural style: Italian Villa
- NRHP reference No.: 83000116
- Added to NRHP: June 23, 1983

Chauncey N. Lawton House, also known as the office of Diamond & Diamond Attorneys at Law, is a historic home located at South Bend, Indiana. It was built in 1872, and is a two-story, asymmetrical plan, Italian Villa style brick dwelling. It features a three-story tower; round arched openings; polygonal bays; and paired, scrolled, and incised brackets.

It was listed on the National Register of Historic Places in 1983.
