= Peter Houghtaling Farm and Lime Kiln =

- U.S. National Register of Historic Places
- U.S. Historic district
- Location within New York Location within the United States
- Location: Lime Kiln Rd., West Coxsackie, New York
- Coordinates: 42°23′36″N 73°51′18″W
- Area: 154 acres (62 ha)
- Built: 1794
- Architectural style: Vernacular Dutch house
- NRHP reference No.: 86000491
- Added to NRHP: March 20, 1986

Peter Houghtaling Farm and Lime Kiln is a national historic district located at West Coxsackie in Greene County, New York. The district contains eight contributing buildings, one contributing site, and two contributing structures. The property includes a 1794 stone house, a well and smokehouse dated to about 1794, a 19th-century privy, three 19th-century barns, an early 20th-century equipment barn and chicken coop, and 19th-century burial ground. The lime kiln is constructed of battered walls of mortared rubble limestone. It was built between 1850 and 1880.

It was listed on the National Register of Historic Places in 1986.
