= Brigadier General David McCarty Stone Cottage =

Historic house in New York, United States

- U.S. National Register of Historic Places
- Location within New York Location within the United States
- Location: 29 2nd St., Coeymans Landing, New York
- Coordinates: 42°28′29″N 73°47′32″W
- Area: 0.13 acres (0.053 ha)
- Built: c. 1770
- Architectural style: Colonial
- NRHP reference No.: 15000474
- Added to NRHP: July 28, 2015

Brigadier General David McCarty Stone Cottage is a historic home located at Coeymans Landing, Albany County, New York. It was built about 1770, and is a 1 1/2-story, Colonial period stone dwelling. It measures roughly 20 feet by 40 feet in size and has a moderately pitched gable roof sheathed with 19th century metal shingles. It was the home of General David McCarty, who was an active participant in the events leading up to the American Revolution, served in the Continental Army and held numerous appointments in the post revolutionary era.

It was listed on the National Register of Historic Places in 2015.
