= Isaac M. Haswell House =

Historic house in New York, United States

- U.S. National Register of Historic Places
- Location within New York Location within the United States
- Location: 67 Haswell Rd., Colonie, New York
- Coordinates: 42°44′54″N 73°43′34″W
- Area: less than one acre
- Built: 1880
- Architectural style: Italianate
- MPS: Colonie Town MRA
- NRHP reference No.: 85002707
- Added to NRHP: October 3, 1985

Isaac M. Haswell House is a historic home located at Colonie in Albany County, New York, USA. It was built in 1880 and is a two-story farmhouse in the Italianate style. It has a one-story porch with ornate brackets, finials and carved rope decorations.

It was listed on the National Register of Historic Places in 1985.
