= Ebenezer Hills Jr. Farmhouse =

Historic house in New York, United States

- U.S. National Register of Historic Places
- Location within New York Location within the United States
- Location: 1010 Troy–Schenectady Rd., Colonie, New York
- Coordinates: 42°45′44″N 73°48′10″W
- Area: 29.4 acres (11.9 ha)
- Built: 1785
- Architectural style: Neo-classic
- MPS: Colonie Town MRA
- NRHP reference No.: 85002712
- Added to NRHP: October 03, 1985

Ebenezer Hills Jr. Farmhouse is a historic home located at Colonie in Albany County, New York. It was built about 1785 by Ebenezer Hills Jr. and is a two-story, five bay center hall plan frame farmhouse on a stone foundation. It features a one-story porch with a shed roof built about 1860 and supported by simple square columns and decorative brackets. Also on the property are three barns, a shed, and greenhouse.

It was listed on the National Register of Historic Places in 1985.
