= Martin Dunsbach House =

Historic house in New York, United States

- U.S. National Register of Historic Places
- Location within New York Location within the United States
- Location: 140 Dunsbach Ferry Rd., Colonie, New York
- Coordinates: 42°47′6″N 73°45′25″W
- Area: 2.5 acres (1.0 ha)
- Built: c. 1840
- Architectural style: Greek Revival
- MPS: Colonie Town MRA
- NRHP reference No.: 85002705
- Added to NRHP: October 3, 1985

The Martin Dunsbach House is a historic house located in Colonie, Albany County, New York.

== Description and history ==
Built in about 1840, it is a two-story brick farmhouse constructed in the Greek Revival style. A 1 1/2-story ell features eyebrow windows. It has an unusual two-bay carriage shed incorporated into the ell.

It was listed on the National Register of Historic Places on October 3, 1985.
