= Henry-Remsen House =

Historic house in New York, United States

- U.S. National Register of Historic Places
- Location within New York Location within the United States
- Location: 34 Spring St., Colonie, New York
- Coordinates: 42°42′58″N 73°45′2″W
- Area: 2.2 acres (0.89 ha)
- Architectural style: Greek Revival
- MPS: Colonie Town MRA
- NRHP reference No.: 85002711
- Added to NRHP: October 3, 1985

Henry-Remsen House was a historic home located at Colonie in Albany County, New York. It was an example of a Greek Revival–style farmhouse. The earliest portion of the house, a 1 1/2-story ell, was built between about 1830 and 1850. The main structure was two stories with a pedimented gable roof. Other additions were completed between 1860 and the 1920s. Also on the property was a contributing barn. It is no longer extant; it has been dismantled.

It was listed on the National Register of Historic Places in 1985.
