= Royal K. Fuller House =

Historic house in New York, United States

- U.S. National Register of Historic Places
- Location within New York Location within the United States
- Location: 294 Loudon Rd., Colonie, New York
- Coordinates: 42°41′0″N 73°45′11″W
- Area: 1.5 acres (0.61 ha)
- Built: 1926
- Architectural style: Norman; Late Medieval
- MPS: Colonie Town MRA
- NRHP reference No.: 85002706
- Added to NRHP: October 3, 1985

The Royal K. Fuller House is a historic house located at 294 Loudon Road in Colonie, Albany County, New York.

== Description and history ==
It was built in 1926, and is a one-story single dwelling designed in an eclectic style incorporating details from medieval European architecture. It features a steeply pitched flared gable roof covered with rough polychrome slate. It also has leaded and stained glass windows, irregular brick and brickwork, and intentionally gouged woodwork.

It was listed on the National Register of Historic Places on October 3, 1985.
