= Senator William T. Byrne House =

Historic house in New York, United States

- U.S. National Register of Historic Places
- Location within New York Location within the United States
- Location: 463 Loudon Rd., Colonie, New York
- Coordinates: 42°42′35″N 73°45′19″W
- Area: 1.5 acres (0.61 ha)
- Built: 1916
- Architect: Van Guysling, Walter
- Architectural style: Colonial Revival
- MPS: Colonie Town MRA
- NRHP reference No.: 85002703
- Added to NRHP: October 03, 1985

Senator William T. Byrne House is a historic home located at Colonie in Albany County, New York. It is a single-story residence with two single-story wings. It features a single-story front portico supported by four square columns. The roofs have wings along the top balustrades. The rear wall was built around 1880 and the front section in 1916. It is in the Colonial Revival architecture style. The property was purchased by Senator William T. Byrne in 1910.

It was listed on the National Register of Historic Places in 1985.
