= Friend Humphrey House =

Historic house in New York, United States

- U.S. National Register of Historic Places
- Location within New York Location within the United States
- Location: 372 Albany-Shaker Rd., Colonie, New York
- Coordinates: 42°41′32″N 73°45′49″W
- Area: 1.5 acres (0.61 ha)
- Built: 1841
- Architectural style: Greek Revival, Federal
- MPS: Colonie Town MRA
- NRHP reference No.: 85002713
- Added to NRHP: October 3, 1985

Friend Humphrey House is a historic home located at Colonie in Albany County, New York. It is named after Friend Humphrey, former New York Senate member and former mayor of Albany. It was built about 1841 and is a two-story frame farmhouse with a gable roof and two symmetrically placed chimneys. A one-story ell was added about 1880. It is a transitional vernacular Greek Revival / Federal style dwelling.

It was listed on the National Register of Historic Places in 1985.
