= Alexander Willis House =

Historic house in New York, United States

- U.S. National Register of Historic Places
- Location within New York Location within the United States
- Location: NY 143, Coeymans Landing, New York
- Coordinates: 42°28′28″N 73°47′48″W
- Area: 1.9 acres (0.77 ha)
- Built: 1852
- Architectural style: Greek Revival, Gothic Revival
- NRHP reference No.: 04000289
- Added to NRHP: April 16, 2004

Alexander Willis House is a historic home located at Coeymans Landing in Albany County, New York. It was built about 1852 and is a two-story frame dwelling in a transitional Greek Revival / Gothic Revival style. The rear elevation has a large two-story wing with enclosed porch. It features broad eaves supported by ornate brackets and broad paneled corner boards. The steep gable roof has a central dormer with smaller flanking dormers.

It was listed on the National Register of Historic Places in 2003.
