= Louis Menand House =

Historic house in New York, United States

- U.S. National Register of Historic Places
- Location within New York Location within the United States
- Location: 40 Cemetery Ave., Menands, New York
- Coordinates: 42°42′10″N 73°43′24″W
- Area: 3.9 acres (1.6 ha)
- Built: 1881
- Architectural style: Stick/Eastlake, Queen Anne
- MPS: Colonie Town MRA
- NRHP reference No.: 85002742
- Added to NRHP: October 3, 1985

Louis Menand House is a historic home located at Menands, New York in Albany County, New York. It is a two-story, Queen Anne style farmhouse with a cross-gable roof and central chimney. The rear section was built about 1840 and the front section in 1881. It features fishscale shingles on the gable ends. Also on the property are a contributing garage, three sheds, and the foundation of a greenhouse. It is located near the entrance to the Albany Rural Cemetery and St. Agnes Cemetery. The surrounding area was designated the Menand Park Historic District in 1985. A descendant of the original owner is American writer and academic Louis Menand.

It was listed on the National Register of Historic Places in 1985.

The building and 3 ½ acres was purchased by St. Agnes Cemetery in 2016. It now serves as the central administrative office of Albany Diocesan Cemeteries.
