= Alfred H. Renshaw House =

Historic house in New York, United States

- U.S. National Register of Historic Places
- Location within New York Location within the United States
- Location: 33 Fiddlers Ln., Colonie, New York
- Coordinates: 42°43′26″N 73°45′2″W
- Area: 8.1 acres (3.3 ha)
- Built: 1926
- Architect: Sturgis, Norman; Rosch Bros.
- Architectural style: Tudor Revival
- MPS: Colonie Town MRA
- NRHP reference No.: 85002746
- Added to NRHP: October 3, 1985

The Alfred H. Renshaw House is a historic house located at 33 Fiddlers Lane in Colonie, Albany County, New York.

== Description and history ==
It was built in 1926-1927 and is a brick mansion in the Tudor Revival style. It features three tall chimneys with paired flues, a slate roof with multiple gables, and a Tudor arch around the main entrance. The property includes formal gardens and a gazebo.

It was listed on the National Register of Historic Places on October 3, 1985.
