= Stickney-Shepard House =

Historic house in Massachusetts, United States

- U.S. National Register of Historic Places
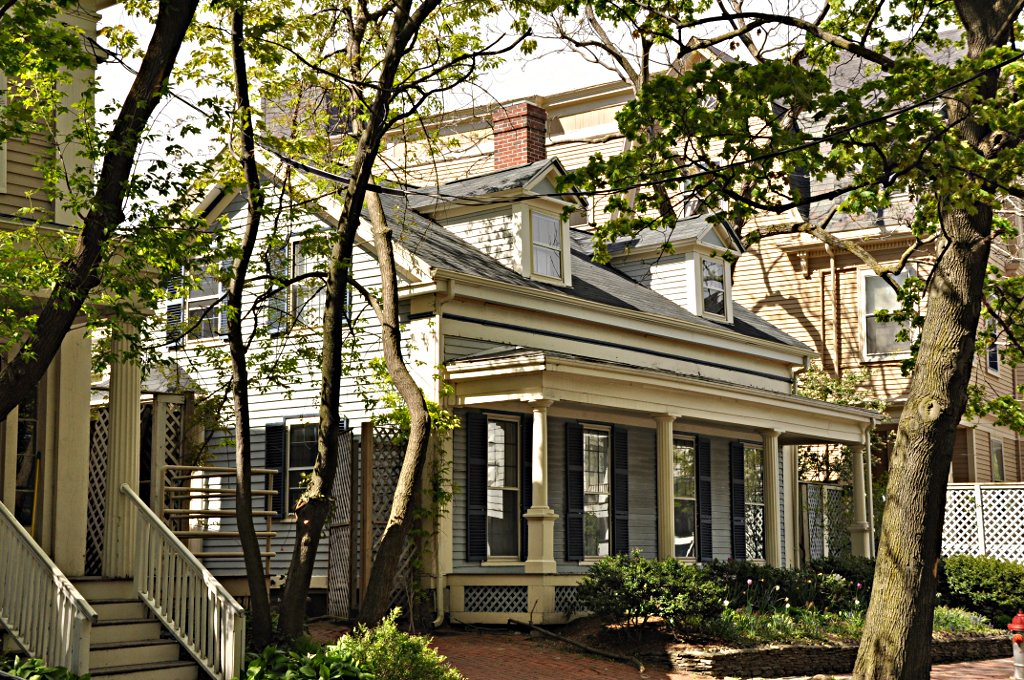

- Location within Massachusetts Location within the United States
- Location: Cambridge, Massachusetts
- Coordinates: 42°22′16.8″N 71°6′48.4″W
- Built: 1846
- Architect: Stickney, N.U.; Shepard, S.P.
- Architectural style: Greek Revival
- MPS: Cambridge MRA
- NRHP reference No.: 86001315
- Added to NRHP: May 19, 1986

The Stickney-Shepard House is an historic house at 11-13 Remington Street in Cambridge, Massachusetts. The 1 1/2-story Greek Revival double house was built 1846-47 by N. Stickney and S. P. Shepard, and is a well-preserved example of the form. It has a heavy cornice, with corner pilasters, and a full-width front porch supported by plain columns on the corners, and fluted Doric columns in the center. The house was built on land originally part of the estate of Francis Dana, which was subdivided and developed in that time.

The house was listed on the National Register of Historic Places in 1986.

== See also ==
- National Register of Historic Places listings in Cambridge, Massachusetts
