= Reformed Dutch Church of Rensselaer in Watervliet =

Historic church in New York, United States

- U.S. National Register of Historic Places
- Location within New York Location within the United States
- Location: 210 Old Loudon Rd., Colonie, New York
- Coordinates: 42°44′52″N 73°45′35″W
- Area: 0.5 acres (0.20 ha)
- Built: 1817
- Architect: Runkle, Henry H.
- Architectural style: Greek Revival, Vernacular Greek Revival
- MPS: Colonie Town MRA
- NRHP reference No.: 85002745
- Added to NRHP: October 3, 1985

Reformed Dutch Church of Rensselaer in Watervliet (also known as Component No. 19) is a historic Reformed Dutch church at 210 Old Loudon Road in the hamlet of Latham, town of Colonie, Albany County, New York. It was built in 1817 in a vernacular Greek Revival style. It has a pedimented roof and corner pilasters. It features a square cupola with a single bell atop the roof with a large channeled cornice with a low pitch roof. It served as a church until 1886 and since then, has been used as a feed store, public meeting hall, chapel, architect firm and most recently, as a theater for stage productions.

It was listed on the National Register of Historic Places in 1985.
