= Hedge Lawn =

Historic house in New York, United States

- U.S. National Register of Historic Places
- Location within New York Location within the United States
- Location: 592 Broadway, Colonie, New York
- Coordinates: 42°42′21″N 73°42′55″W
- Area: 5.3 acres (2.1 ha)
- Built: 1870
- Architect: Hoffman, Ernest
- Architectural style: Greek Revival, Second Empire
- MPS: Colonie Town MRA
- NRHP reference No.: 85002710
- Added to NRHP: October 3, 1985

Hedge Lawn is a historic home located at Colonie in Albany County, New York. It was built in 1870 and is an unusual 2 1/2-story mansion designed in a composite style with Greek Revival and Second Empire style elements. It features a Mansard roof with scalloped slate shingles, three pedimented dormers, and a monumental portico across the front elevation supported by six massive Doric order columns. The property also has a contributing carriage house, lawns, mature plantings, iron fence, and two wagon sheds.

It was listed on the National Register of Historic Places in 1985.
