= John P. Simmons House =

Historic house in Iowa, United States

- U.S. National Register of Historic Places
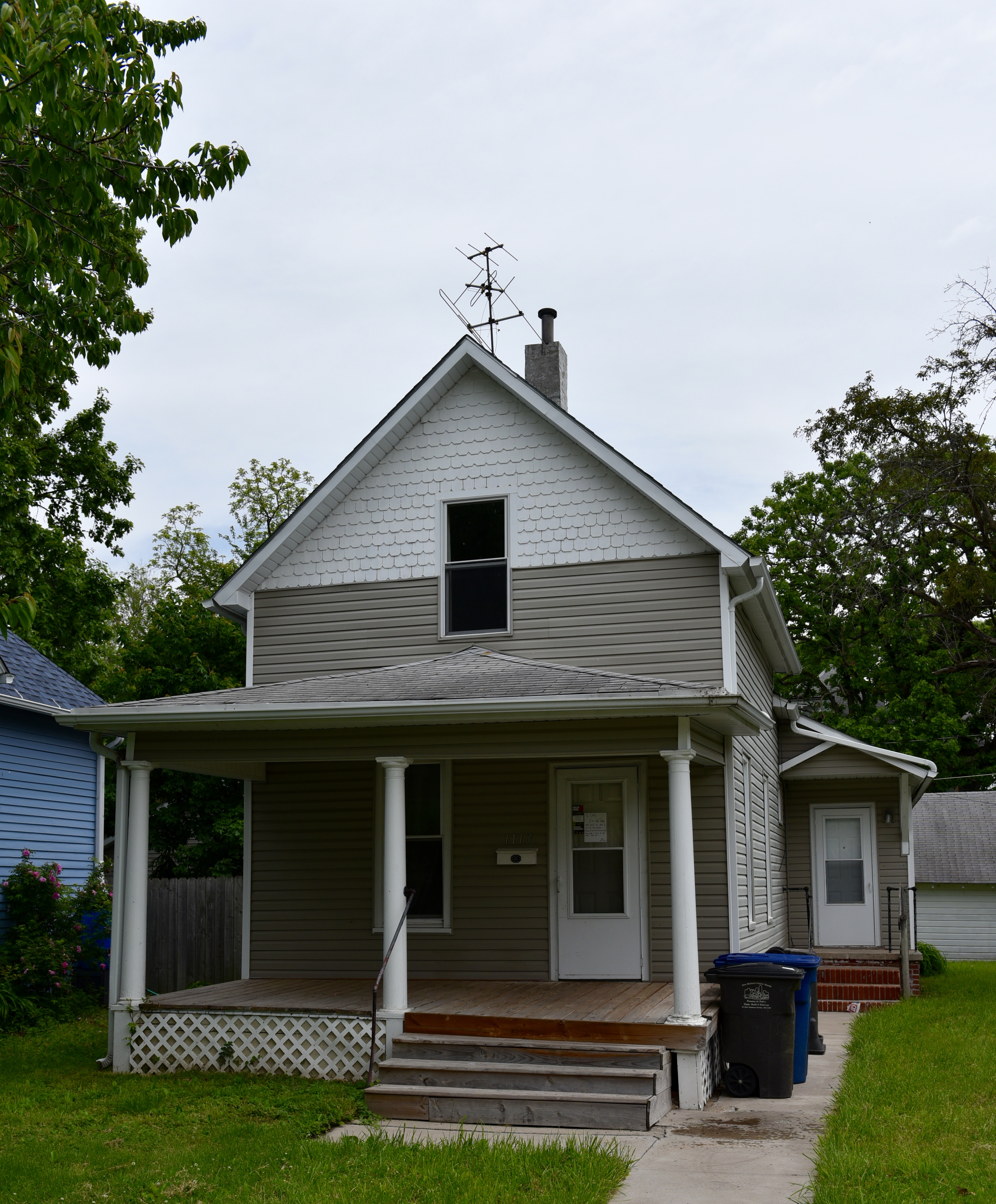

- Location within Iowa Location within the United States
- Location: 1113 27th St., Des Moines, Iowa
- Coordinates: 41°35′55.7″N 93°39′10.9″W
- Area: less than one acre
- Built: 1894
- Architectural style: Late Victorian
- MPS: Drake University and Related Properties in Des Moines, Iowa, 1881--1918 MPS
- NRHP reference No.: 88001339
- Added to NRHP: November 1, 1988

The John P. Simmons House is a historic building located in Des Moines, Iowa, United States. This simple 1½-story frame dwelling features a gable front, rectangular plan, and a hipped roof front porch. The property on which it stands is one of ten plats that were owned by Drake University. The house's significance is attributed to the effect of the University's innovative financing techniques upon the settlement of the area around the campus. Delos Cutler, one of the organizers of the University Land Company, acquired this lot and the one next to it in 1887. He sold them to F.F. Odenweller the following year. John P. Simmons bought this lot 25 in 1894, the same year the house was built. He either sold or mortgaged it to University Bank in 1900. The house was listed on the National Register of Historic Places in 1988.
