= Coeymans (hamlet), New York =

Coeymans, New York
- Hamlet
- Location within New York Location within the United States
- Coordinates: 42°28′26″N 073°47′32″W
- Country: United States
- State: New York
- County: Albany County
- Town: Coeymans

Area
  - Total: 1.221 sq mi (3.16 km^{2})
  - Land: 1.092 sq mi (2.83 km^{2})
  - Water: 0.129 sq mi (0.33 km^{2})
- Elevation: 59 ft (18 m)

Population (2000)
  - Total: 835
  - Density: 683.9/sq mi (264.1/km^{2})
- Time zone: UTC-5 (Eastern (EST))
  - Summer (DST): UTC-4 (EDT)
- ZIP code: 12045
- Area code: 518
- FIPS code: 36-16683
- GNIS feature ID: 947000

Coeymans is a hamlet in Albany County, New York, United States. It is located on Route 144 in the southeastern part of the Town of Coeymans. The population was 835 at the 2000 census, which listed the community as a census-designated place (CDP), but it was not included as a CDP in the 2010 census.

== History ==
The Dr. Wesley Blaisdell House, Abraham Houghtaling House, Brigadier General David McCarty Stone Cottage, and Alexander Willis House are listed on the National Register of Historic Places.

== Geography ==
Coeymans is located at 42°28′26″N 073°47′32″W (42.4739705, -73.7923456) and its elevation is 59 feet (18 m).

According to the 2000 United States census, the CDP had a total area of 1.221 square miles (3.16 km^{2}), of which 1.092 square miles (2.83 km^{2}) was land and 0.129 square miles (0.33 km^{2}) was water.

Coeymans is on the west bank of the Hudson River.

== Demographics ==
As of the census of 2000, there were 835 people, 313 households, and 215 families residing in the CDP. The population density was 764.3 inhabitants per square mile (295.1/km^{2}). There were 354 housing units at an average density of 324.0 per square mile (125.1/km^{2}). The racial makeup of the CDP was 91.50% White, 4.19% Black or African American, 0.36% Native American, 0.36% Asian, 2.28% from other races, and 1.32% from two or more races. 6.11% of the population were Hispanic or Latino of any race.

There were 313 households, out of which 39.0% had children under the age of 18 living with them, 41.2% were married couples living together, 20.1% had a female householder with no husband present, and 31.3% were non-families. 26.2% of all households were made up of individuals, and 14.4% had someone living alone who was 65 years of age or older. The average household size was 2.61 and the average family size was 3.15.

In the CDP, the population was spread out, with 31.6% under the age of 18, 6.7% from 18 to 24, 27.9% from 25 to 44, 20.7% from 45 to 64, and 13.1% who were 65 years of age or older. The median age was 35 years. For every 100 females, there were 91.1 males. For every 100 females age 18 and over, there were 79.0 males.

The median income for a household in the CDP was $34,440, and the median income for a family was $44,554. Males had a median income of $41,250 versus $27,125 for females. The per capita income for the CDP was $16,212. 9.0% of the population and 9.5% of families were below the poverty line. Out of the total population, 11.1% of those under the age of 18 and 17.6% of those 65 and older were living below the poverty line.
