= District School No. 7 =

- U.S. National Register of Historic Places
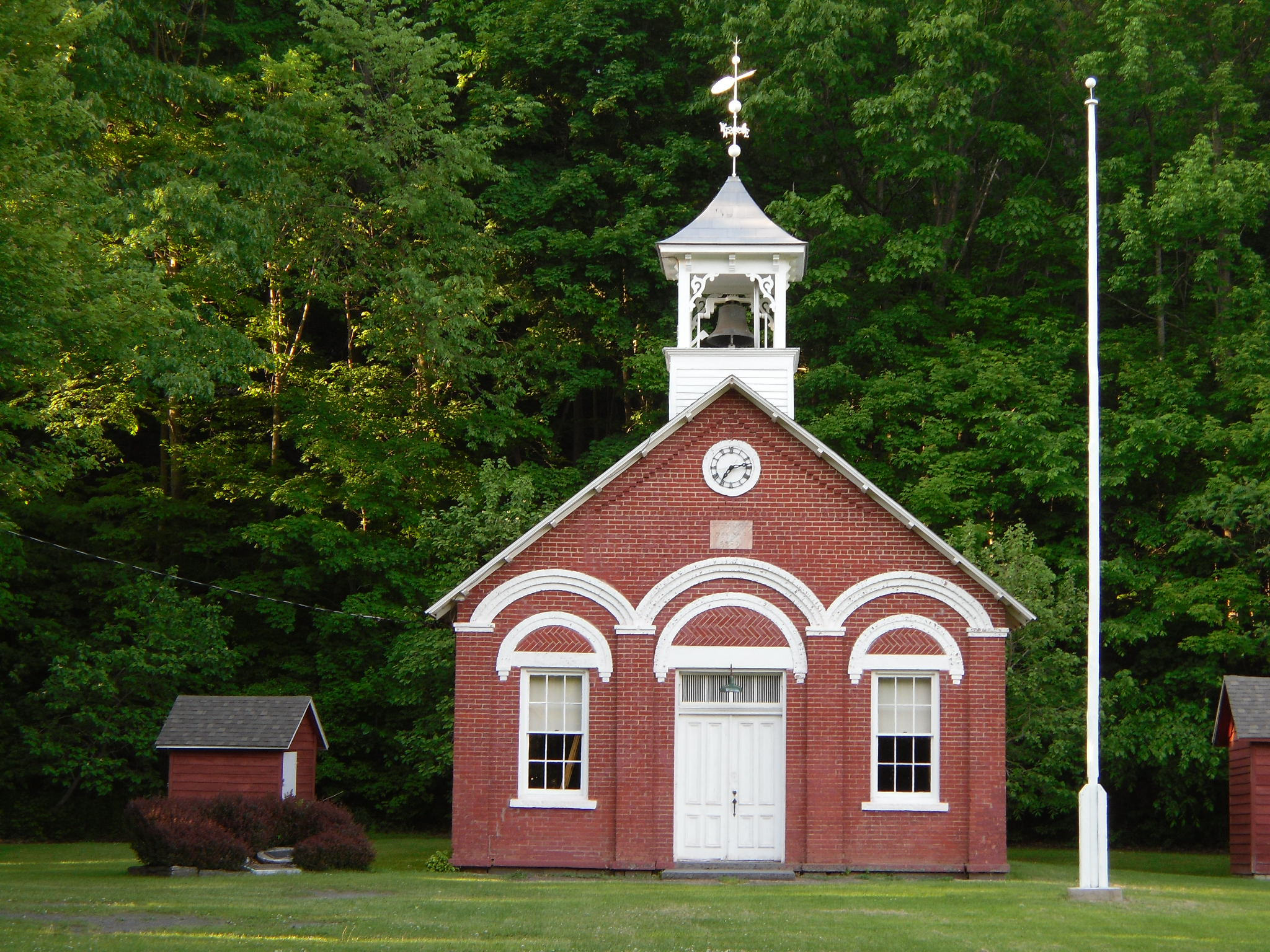
- District School No. 7, May 2010

- Location within New York Location within the United States
- Location: NY 143, approximately .25 mi. W of jct. with Co. Rt. 103, Coeymans Hollow, New York
- Coordinates: 42°28′26″N 73°54′1″W
- Area: less than one acre
- Built: 1879
- Architectural style: Italianate
- NRHP reference No.: 96000562
- Added to NRHP: May 16, 1996

District School No. 7, also known as "The Little Red Schoolhouse", is a historic one-room school building located at Coeymans Hollow in Albany County, New York. It was built in 1879 and is a single-story, rectangular brick building, three bays by three bays in the Italianate style. It features a shingle-clad gable roof surmounted by an open belfry. It features overhanging roof eaves and ornate door and window hood moulds. School use ceased in 1957. It houses the Little Red Schoolhouse Historical Society.

It was listed on the National Register of Historic Places in 1996.
