= George Trimble House (Colonie, New York) =

Historic house in New York, United States

- U.S. National Register of Historic Places
- Location within New York Location within the United States
- Location: 158 Spring Street Rd., Colonie, New York
- Coordinates: 42°42′49″N 73°43′34″W
- Area: less than one acre
- Built: 1909
- Architectural style: Arts & Craft
- MPS: Colonie Town MRA
- NRHP reference No.: 85002750
- Added to NRHP: October 3, 1985

The George Trimble House in Colonie in Albany County, New York. It was built in 1909 and is a 1 1/2-story stucco house in the Arts and Crafts style. It has a gable roof and a large shed dormer across the rear elevation.

It was listed on the National Register of Historic Places in 1985.
