= Mohonasen High School =

Coordinates: 42°46′06″N 73°57′24″W

Location
- 2072 Curry Rd; Rotterdam, New York; United States

Information
- School type: Public (U.S.)
- Founded: 1960 (First Graduating Class)
- School district: Mohonasen Central School District
- Principal: Daniella DeLuca
- Grades: 9-12
- Enrollment: 890 (2023-2024)
- Campus type: Suburban
- Color
- Mascot: Native American Warrior
- Website: Mohonasen High School

Mohonasen High School is a high school located in Rotterdam, New York, United States. Enrollment is around 900 students in Grades 9 – 12. Like all other public schools in New York, the school's curriculum is based on the Board of Regents standards. Mohonasen High School is known throughout the Capital District for its award-winning and varied televised events schedule, under the direction of Mr. Marvin Q. Veeder.

== Name ==
The name of the school is derived from the names of three members of the Iroquois League, the Mohawk, the Onondaga, and the Seneca (Moh-Ona-Sen).
