= Treemont Manor =

Historic house in New York, United States

- U.S. National Register of Historic Places
- Location within New York Location within the United States
- Location: 71 Old Niskayuna Rd., Colonie, New York
- Coordinates: 42°42′52″N 73°45′49″W
- Area: 11 acres (4.5 ha)
- Built: 1929
- Architect: Adams & Prentice; Waldbillig, John B., Inc.
- Architectural style: Colonial Revival, Georgian Revival
- MPS: Colonie Town MRA
- NRHP reference No.: 85002749
- Added to NRHP: October 3, 1985

Treemont Manor is a historic home located at Colonie in Albany County, New York. It was built in 1929 and is an L-shaped Georgian Revival style mansion. It set within a formal English garden. The main house is two and one half stories with a gable roof, with a two-story servant's wing attached. Also on the property is a contributing guest house.

It was listed on the National Register of Historic Places in 1985.
