= South Colonie Central School District =

Public school district in New York, US

Location
- Colonie, New York, Niskayuna, New York United States

District information
- Grades: K-12
- Superintendent: David J. Perry
- Schools: Veeder Elementary, Saddlewood Elementary, Forest Park Elementary, Roessleville Elementary, Shaker Road Elementary, Sand Creek Middle, Lisha Kill Middle, Colonie Central High
- Budget: $147.6M (as of October 2026)
- NCES District ID: 3627210

Students and staff
- Students: 4,800+
- Teachers: 380+
- Staff: 500+ (incl. teachers)
- Student–teacher ratio: 13:1
- Athletic conference: Suburban Council
- District mascot: Wolf Pack
- Colors: Garnet and Gold

Other information
- Website: www.southcolonieschools.org

South Colonie Central School District is a public school district located mostly in the Town of Colonie, New York, but also has schools in Albany, New York (such as Colonie Central High-school). It has enrollment of 4,847 students in grades PreK–12 in 8 schools and a student to teacher ratio of 13:1. Its graduation rate is 91%. The district, sandwiched between Albany and Schenectady, is primarily suburban. The area urbanized over the years, with rural land and farms very sparse within district boundaries. It is relatively unique amongst peer school districts because it sends all fifth and sixth graders to middle school.

== Schools ==
The district contains five elementary schools (Kindergarten-4th grade). 5th-8th-grade students attend one of two middle schools, while the high school serves grades 9-12. Alternative education options are available for district middle and high school students who are not thriving in the traditional classroom setting. These include computer-based learning at two non-school buildings within district boundaries.

- Colonie Central High School (Wolfpack)
- Sand Creek Middle School (Wolfpack)

(feeder schools: Shaker Rd. Elem., Roessleville Elem., Forest Park Elem.)

- Lisha Kill Middle School (Wolfpack)

(feeder schools: Saddlewood Elem., Veeder Elem.)

- Shaker Road Elementary School (Turtles)
- Roessleville Elementary School (Dyno-Rhinos)
- Forest Park Elementary School (Falcons)
- Saddlewood Elementary School (Stars)
- Veeder Elementary School (Owls)
- Capital Region Career & Technical School (Vocational programs managed by BOCES, not South Colonie)

== Former schools ==
- Colonie Village School

Central Av. @ Locust Pk.

- Roessleville Elementary/High

Central Av. @ McNutt Av.

- Maywood Elementary

Central Av. @ Culver Av.

- F D Roosevelt Elementary

Central Av. @ N. Lansing Rd.

- Lansing School

== Board of education ==
As of 2026-2027 school year

- David Kiehle, President
- Mike Keane, Vice President
- Thomas Blakey
- Brian Casey
- Stephanie Cogan
- Rose Gigliello
- Jen Houlihan
- Jennifer Jones
- Christopher Larrabee
- Vincent Forenzo, Student Representative
