= Abraham Houghtaling House =

Historic house in New York, United States

- U.S. National Register of Historic Places
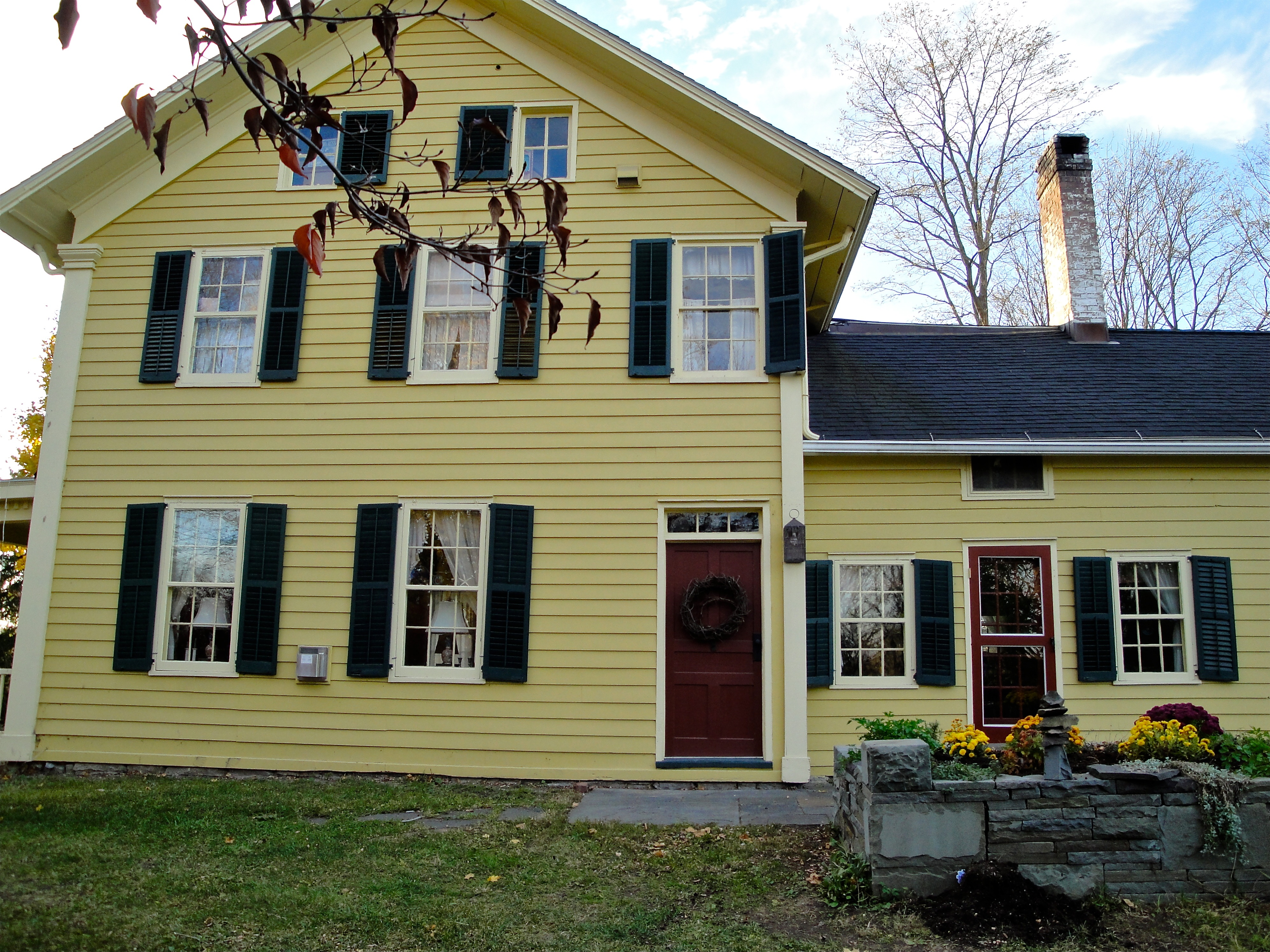

- Location within New York Location within the United States
- Location: 54 Church St., Coeymans Landing, New York
- Coordinates: 42°28′28″N 73°47′56″W
- Area: 5.3 acres (2.1 ha)
- Built: 1830
- Architectural style: Greek Revival
- NRHP reference No.: 98000134
- Added to NRHP: February 20, 1998

Abraham Houghtaling House is a historic home located at Coeymans Landing in Albany County, New York. It was built about 1830 and is a two-story, rectangular, heavy timber frame Greek Revival style dwelling. It features a projecting center entry bay and a single story porch. It has a rubble stone foundation and a broad, overhanging gable roof. Also on the property is a contributing smoke house.

It was listed on the National Register of Historic Places in 1998.
