= Teunis Houghtaling House =

Historic house in New York, United States

- U.S. National Register of Historic Places
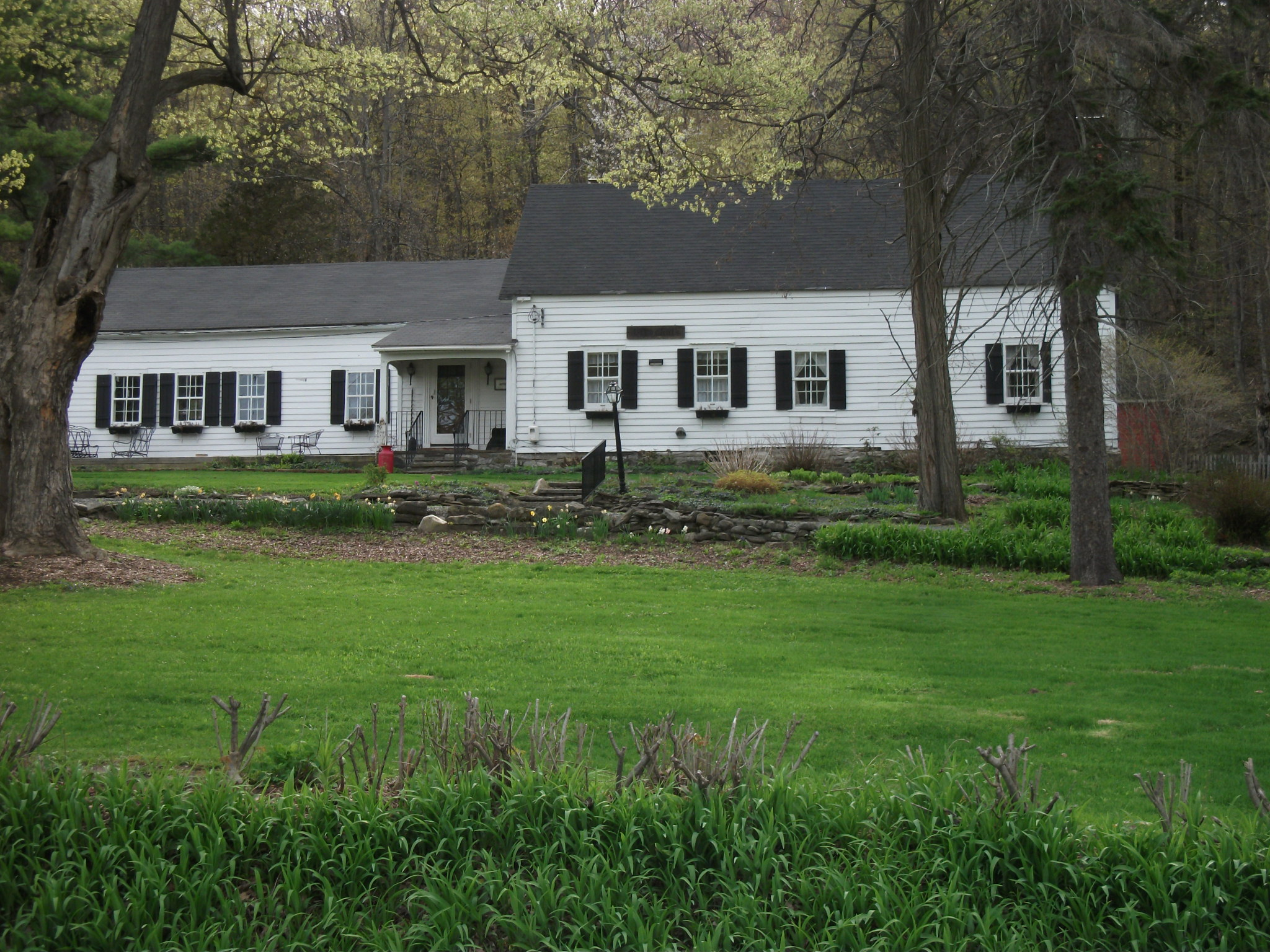
- The Teunis Houghtaling House seen in May 2011

- Location within New York Location within the United States
- Nearest city: Clarksville, New York
- Coordinates: 42°33′53″N 73°58′32″W
- Area: 9.9 acres (4.0 ha)
- Built: 1770
- NRHP reference No.: 04000751
- Added to NRHP: July 28, 2004

Teunis Houghtaling House, also known as Vredehuis, is a historic home located at Clarksville in Albany County, New York. It was built in two stages: the 1 1/2-story main block was built about 1770, expanded to a five-bay dwelling about 1790, at which time a 1-story addition was also completed. It is constructed of hand-hewn timber framing. Also on the property are two frame outbuildings and a small family cemetery with burials dating to the early 19th century.

It was listed on the National Register of Historic Places in 2004.
