= Menand Park Historic District =

Historic district in New York, United States

- U.S. National Register of Historic Places
- U.S. Historic district
- Location within New York Location within the United States
- Location: Roughly bounded by Menand Rd., Broadway, and Tillinghast Ave., Menands, New York
- Coordinates: 42°41′38″N 73°43′27″W
- Area: 2.5 acres (1.0 ha)
- Architect: Vanderhyden Corp.
- Architectural style: Prairie School, Bungalow/Craftsman
- MPS: Colonie Town MRA
- NRHP reference No.: 85002708
- Added to NRHP: October 3, 1985

Menand Park Historic District is a national historic district located in the village of Menands in Albany County, New York. It includes 21 contributing buildings; all are residences. The district encompasses an unusual collection of bungalows and Prairie Style houses designed in the period from 1913 to 1925. Most of them have low sloping roofs with wide overhangs and exposed rafters, recessed porches supported by massive brick or cobblestone piers, and cobblestone or stucco coated chimneys.

It was listed on the National Register of Historic Places in 1985.
