= George H. Lawton House =

Historic house in New York, United States

- U.S. National Register of Historic Places
- Location within New York Location within the United States
- Location: 27 Maxwell Rd., Colonie, New York
- Coordinates: 42°43′28″N 73°45′24″W
- Area: less than one acre
- Built: 1852
- Architectural style: Gothic Revival
- MPS: Colonie Town MRA
- NRHP reference No.: 85002741
- Added to NRHP: October 3, 1985

George H. Lawton House is a historic home located at Colonie in Albany County, New York. It was built about 1852 and is a 1 1/2-story cottage in the Gothic Revival style. It has board and batten siding, exposed roof rafters, and a 1-story porch with simple supports. It is a distinctive example of mid-19th-century "pattern book" architecture.

It was listed on the National Register of Historic Places in 1985.
