= Simmons Stone House =

Historic house in New York, United States

- U.S. National Register of Historic Places
- Location within New York Location within the United States
- Location: 554 Boght Rd., Colonie, New York
- Coordinates: 42°47′1″N 73°44′15″W
- Area: less than one acre
- Built: 1847
- Architectural style: Italianate
- MPS: Colonie Town MRA
- NRHP reference No.: 85002747
- Added to NRHP: October 3, 1985

Simmons Stone House is a historic home located at Colonie in Albany County, New York. It was built between 1847 and 1849 and is a two-story, massive cruciform plan stone house constructed of random ashlar blocks. It has an intersecting, low pitched gable roof with broad overhanging cornice in the Italianate style. It features a one-story porch across the front elevation with a cobblestone foundation and hipped roof supported by square columns.

It was listed on the National Register of Historic Places in 1985.
