= Bacon-Stickney House =

Historic house in New York, United States

- U.S. National Register of Historic Places
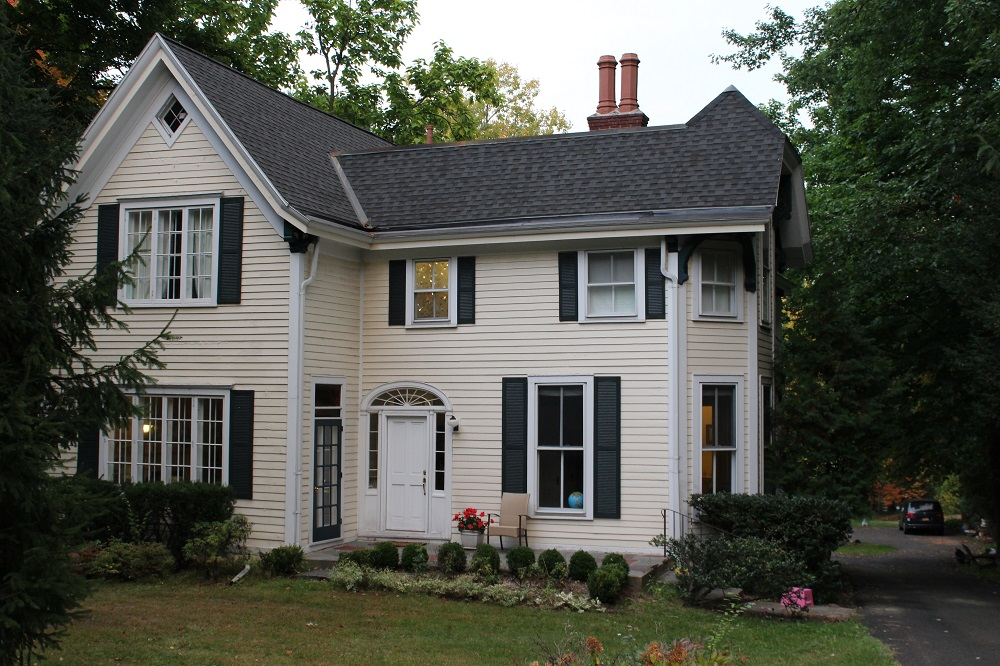

- Location within New York Location within the United States
- Location: 441 Loudon Rd., Colonie, New York
- Coordinates: 42°42′23″N 73°45′18″W
- Area: 1 acre (0.40 ha)
- Built: 1874
- Architect: Woollett, William M.
- Architectural style: Picturesque Cottage
- MPS: Colonie Town MRA
- NRHP reference No.: 85002709
- Added to NRHP: October 3, 1985

The Bacon-Stickney House is a historic house located at 441 Loudon Road in Colonie, Albany County, New York.

== Description and history ==
Built in 1874 and designed by William M. Woollett, it is a two-story, L-shaped residence. It has a gable roof with diamond-shaped windows in the gable ends. It features a jerkin head-type roof over the wing. It is a significant example of late 19th century "pattern book" architecture in the Picturesque Cottage style. Also on the property is a contributing garage and well house.

It was listed on the National Register of Historic Places on October 3, 1985.
