= Menands Manor =

Historic house in New York, United States

- U.S. National Register of Historic Places
- Location within New York Location within the United States
- Location: 272 Broadway, Colonie, New York
- Coordinates: 42°41′35″N 73°43′31″W
- Area: 3.8 acres (1.5 ha)
- Built: 1877
- Architect: Woollett, William M.; Wickam, Richard
- Architectural style: Stick/Eastlake
- MPS: Colonie Town MRA
- NRHP reference No.: 85002743
- Added to NRHP: October 03, 1985

Menands Manor is a historic home located at Colonie in Albany County, New York, United States. The original house was built before 1840 with major additions and alterations in 1877 in the Stick / Eastlake style. It is a 2 1/2-story, U-shaped brick building. It features a multi-gabled slate roof, two 3-story corner towers with pyramidal roofs and wrought iron cresting, and a 2-story porch across the front elevation. A 2-story brick addition was completed in the 1920s. The original house was converted for use by the Home for Aged Men in 1877. In 1982, it housed the Home for Aged Men & Women.

It was listed on the National Register of Historic Places in 1985.
