= Van Denbergh-Simmons House =

Historic house in New York, United States

- U.S. National Register of Historic Places
- Location within New York Location within the United States
- Location: 537 Boght Rd., Colonie, New York
- Coordinates: 42°47′7″N 73°44′5″W
- Area: 2 acres (0.81 ha)
- Architectural style: Mixed (more Than 2 Styles From Different Periods)
- MPS: Colonie Town MRA
- NRHP reference No.: 85002751
- Added to NRHP: October 3, 1985

Van Denbergh-Simmons House is a historic home located at Colonie in Albany County, New York. The house was in three phases: the northeast section was built between about 1720 and 1760; the northwest section about 1790; and the south section about 1847. The northeast section is a 1 1/2-story Dutch house with a 1-story porch. The northwest section is a 1 1/2-story ell containing a large kitchen and bee hive oven. The south section is a 2-story Italian Villa style addition with a hipped roof and large square tower at the northwest corner. Also on the property are the remains of a barn foundation.

It was listed on the National Register of Historic Places in 1985.
