= Gillespie House =

Gillespie House may refer to:

in the United States (by state then city)

- Gillespie House (Sarasota, Florida), listed on the NRHP in Sarasota County
- Gillespie-Jackson House, Starkville, Mississippi, listed on the NRHP in Oktibbeha County
- Gillespie House (Guilderland, New York), listed on the NRHP in Albany County
- Col. George Gillespie House, Limestone, Tennessee, listed on the NRHP in Washington County
- James Gillespie House, Louisville, Tennessee, listed on the NRHP in Blount County
