= Chapel House =

Chapel House may refer to:

in the United Kingdom

- Chapel House Estate, England
- Chapel House, Twickenham, Greater London, occupied at one time by Alfred Lord Tennyson
- Chapel House, Monmouth, Wales

in the United States

- Chapel House (Guilderland, New York), listed on U.S. National Register of Historic Places in Albany County, New York
