= Guilderland Center, New York =

Guilderland Center
- Hamlet
- Etymology: For being roughly in the geographic center of the town of Guilderland
- Location within New York Location within the United States
- Coordinates: 42°42′14″N 73°57′48″W
- Country: United States
- State: New York
- Region: Capital District
- County: Albany
- Town: Guilderland
- Settled: 1790s
- Time zone: UTC-5 (EST)
  - Summer (DST): UTC-4 (EDT)
- ZIP Code: 12085
- Area code: 518

Guilderland Center is a hamlet in the town of Guilderland, Albany County, New York, United States. The hamlet lies along New York Route 146 and the Black Creek, a tributary of the Normans Kill.

== History ==
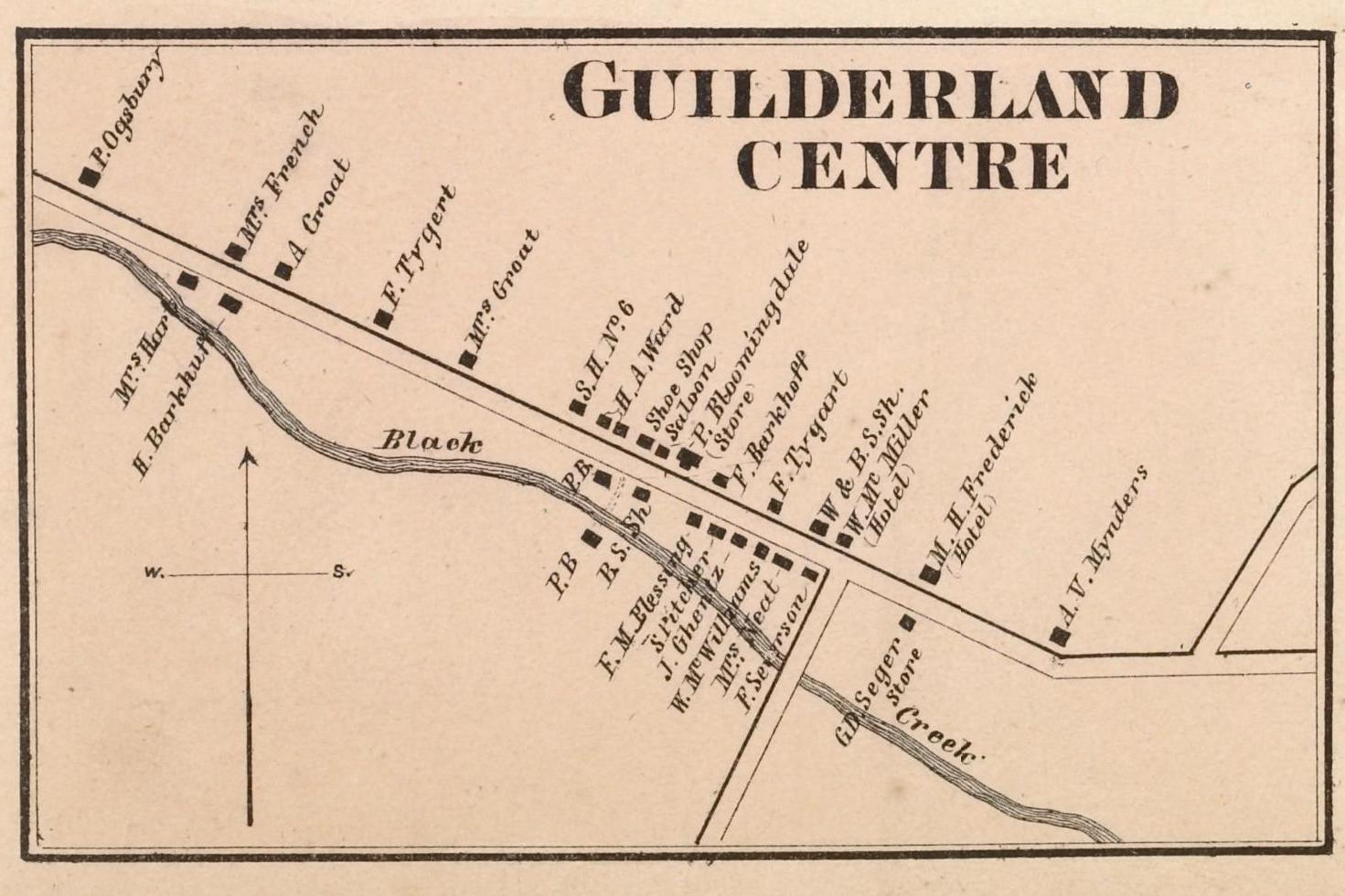
1866 map of Guilderland Center

Guilderland Center includes the factories established at French's Mills, the first of these was built in 1795 by Peter Broeck. The name French's Mills (also referred to as French's Hollow) comes from Abel French, who established a mill of his own here in 1800. French's Hollow and the mills were mostly destroyed when the Black Creek was dammed for the creation of the Watervliet Reservoir in 1916. Abel French's Mill was razed and became the site of the pumping station. Guilderland Center was originally called by the locals Bang-all, in reference to ill effects and reputation that rum, horse racing, and the rough manners of the place brought. Circa 1803, when the town of Guilderland was formed from Watervliet, the name Guilderland Center began to come into fashion; the post office when established also took the name Guilderland Center. By 1866, the hamlet had a population of 450. In 1860 District Number 6 Cobblestone School was built in Guilderland Center, and though the building has not been used as such since 1941, it is still owned by the Guilderland Central School District. The school building is on the National Register of Historic Places.

== Geography ==
As a hamlet, the borders of Guilderland Center are indeterminate. Generally, Guilderland Center is along New York Route 146 from Van Buren Boulevard west to Hurst Road, and includes adjacent areas along School Road (Albany County Route 201) and Depot Road (Albany County Route 202) to their common intersection; and the length of Hurst and French Mill roads. Guilderland Center lies to the south of the Watervliet Reservoir, along the Black Creek.

== Important locations ==
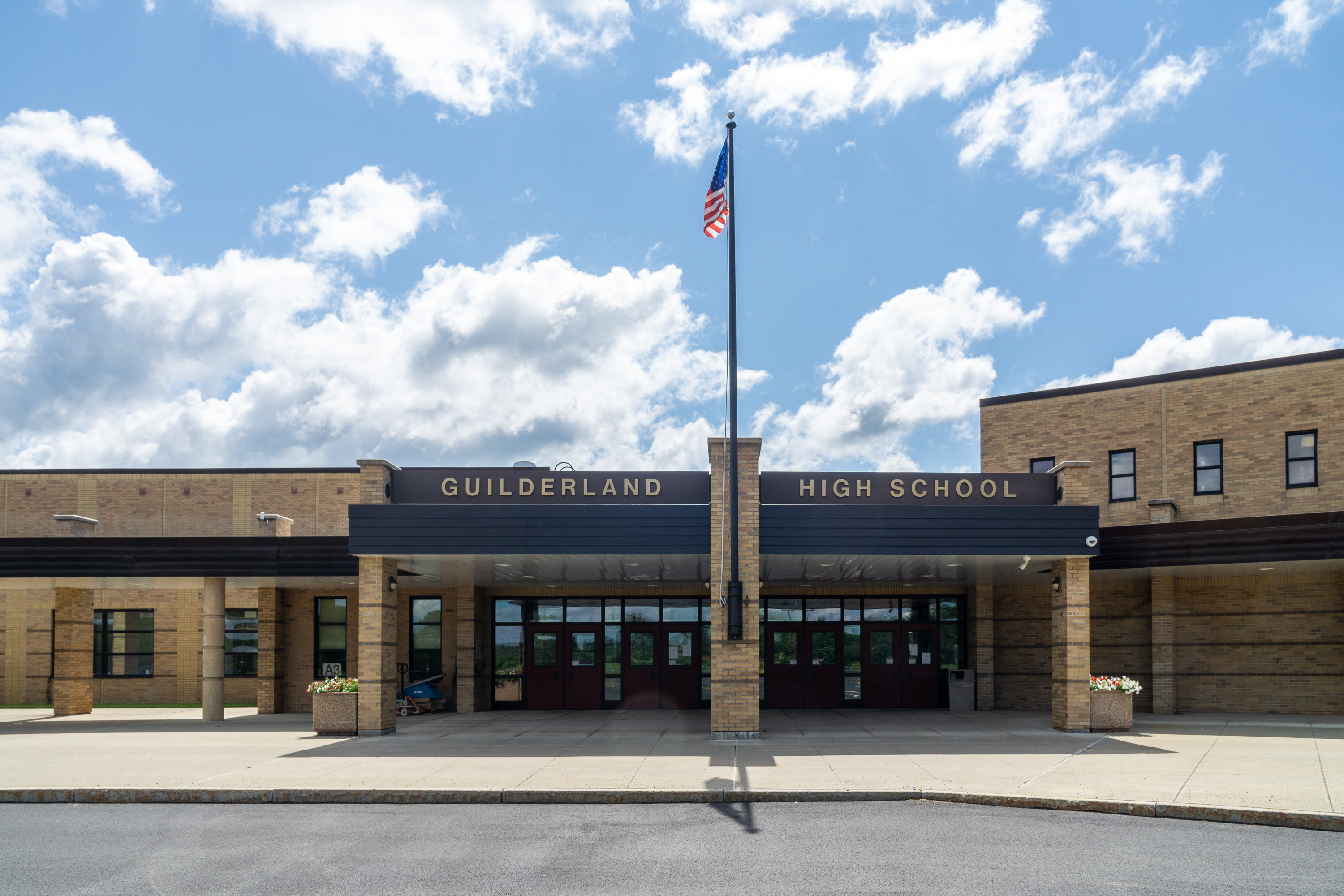
Guilderland High School

- Centerpointe Community Church
- Helderberg Reformed Dutch Church – on the National Register of Historic Places
- St. Mark's Lutheran Church – on the National Register of Historic Places
- Frederick Crouse House – on the National Register of Historic Places
- Guilderland Center Nursing Home
- Northeastern Industrial Park
- French's Hollow Fairways
- Keenholts Park
- Guilderland High School
- Park Guilderland Shopping Center
- Town of Guilderland Landfill
