= Prospect Hill Cemetery Building =

Burial vault in Albany County, New York

- U.S. National Register of Historic Places
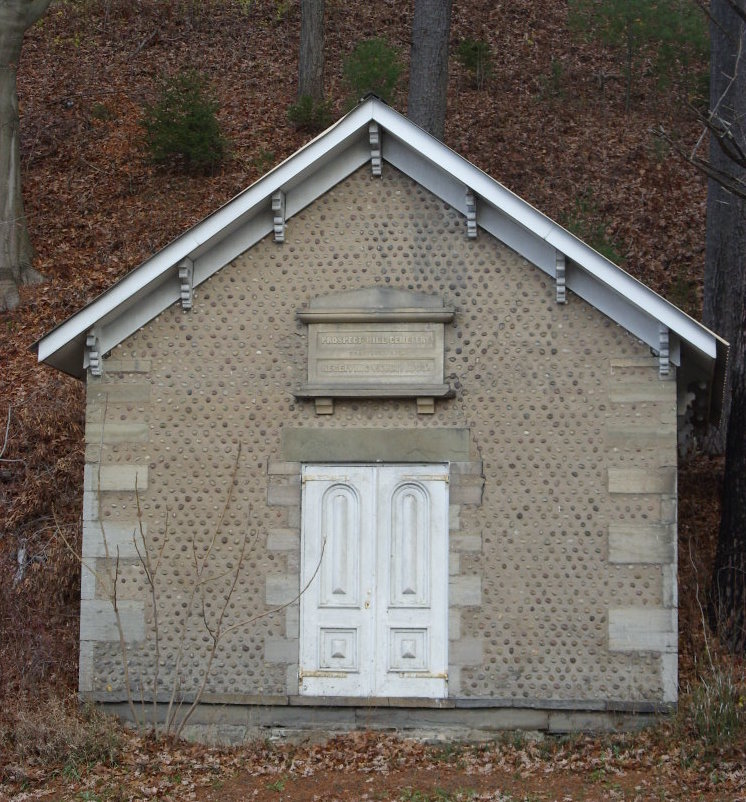
- Prospect Hill Cemetery Building, November 2008

- Location within New York Location within the United States
- Location: Western Tpk., Guilderland, New York
- Coordinates: 42°41′58″N 73°53′58″W
- Area: less than one acre
- Built: 1863
- Architect: Zeh, J.
- MPS: Guilderland MRA
- NRHP reference No.: 82001078
- Added to NRHP: November 10, 1982

Prospect Hill Cemetery Building is a historic burial vault located in Prospect Hill Cemetery at Guilderland in Albany County, New York. It was built in 1863 and is a small one story cobblestone building. It has a slate covered gable roof. It is built of coursed cobblestones with smooth ashlar quoins and a stone lintel above the door.

It was listed on the National Register of Historic Places in 1982.
