= McNiven Farm Complex =

Historic house in New York, United States

- U.S. National Register of Historic Places
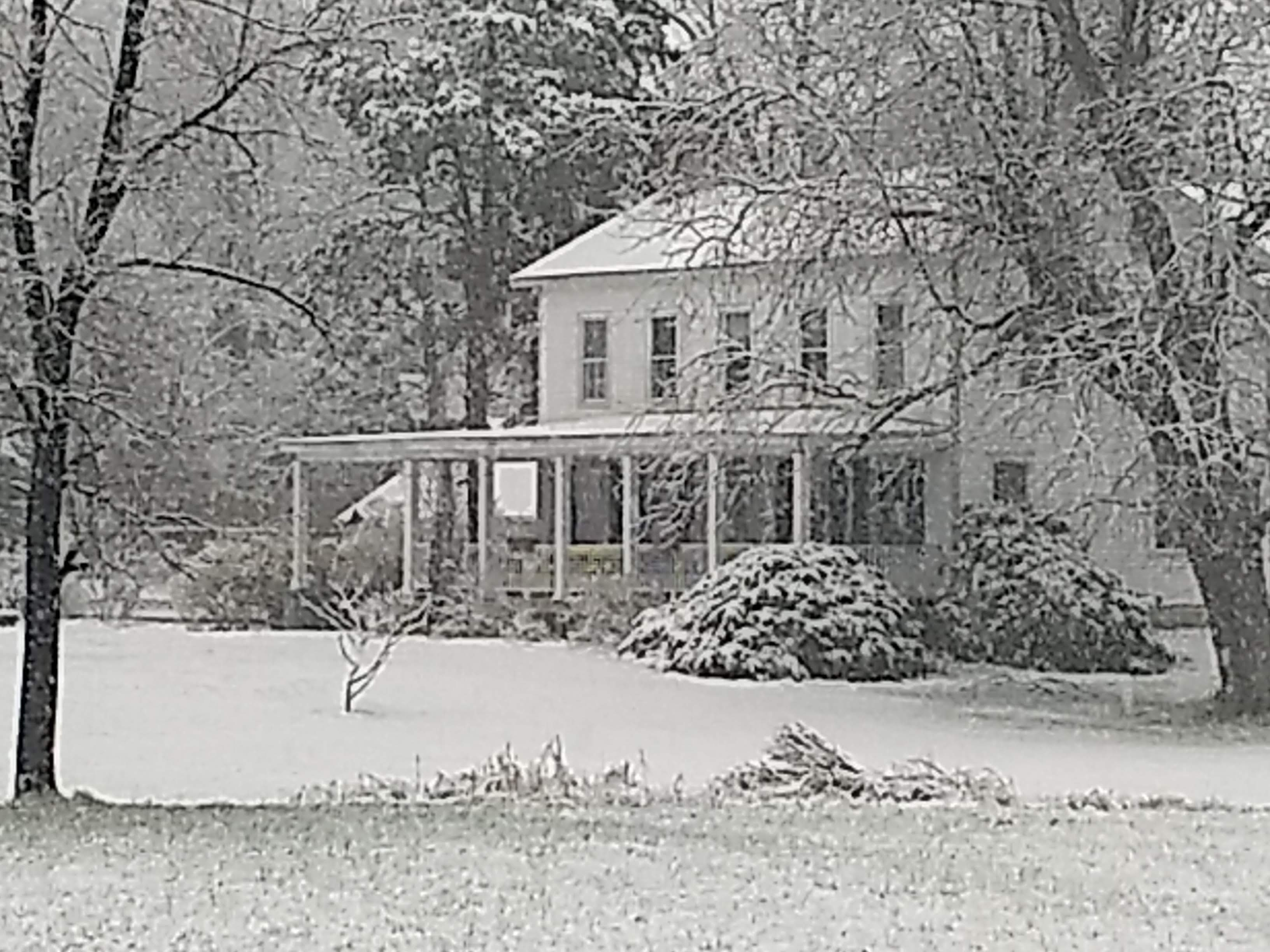
- Complex.farmhouse

- Location within New York Location within the United States
- Location: 4178 Altamont Rd., Guilderland, New York
- Coordinates: 42°42′20″N 74°0′10″W
- Area: 1.9 acres (0.77 ha)
- Built: 1860
- MPS: Guilderland MRA
- NRHP reference No.: 82001074
- Added to NRHP: November 10, 1982

McNiven Farm Complex is a historic home and barn complex located at Guilderland in Albany County, New York. The original house was built about 1790 and is a small Dutch house that is located to the rear of the present structure. A substantial addition was completed in the mid-19th century. It is a two-story, five bay wide farmhouse with a center entrance and gable roof. Also on the property is a vernacular barn complex.

It was listed on the National Register of Historic Places in 1982.
