= Frederick Crouse House =

Historic house in New York, United States

- U.S. National Register of Historic Places
- Location within New York Location within the United States
- Location: 3960 Altamont-Voorheesville Rd., Guilderland, New York
- Coordinates: 42°40′49″N 74°1′13″W
- Area: 8 acres (3.2 ha)
- Built: c. 1760, 1802
- Architectural style: Federal
- MPS: Guilderland MRA
- NRHP reference No.: 82001059
- Added to NRHP: November 10, 1982

The Frederick Crouse House is a historic house located at 3960 Altamont-Voorheesville Road in Guilderland, Albany County, New York.

== Description and history ==
The original stone Dutch house was built in about 1760. The house was expanded around 1780, then the main house was built in 1802. It is a substantial Federal style farmhouse and one of the oldest structures in Guilderland.

It was listed on the National Register of Historic Places on November 10, 1982.
