= Sharp Brothers House =

Historic house in New York, United States

- U.S. National Register of Historic Places
- Location within New York Location within the United States
- Location: 4382 Western Tpk., Guilderland, New York
- Coordinates: 42°44′7″N 73°59′20″W
- Area: 7.7 acres (3.1 ha)
- Built: 1850
- Architectural style: Queen Anne
- MPS: Guilderland MRA
- NRHP reference No.: 82001083
- Added to NRHP: November 10, 1982

Sharp Brothers House is a historic home located at Guilderland in Albany County, New York. The rear section was built about 1850 and the front about 1880. It is a large, 2 1/2-story Queen Anne–style dwelling. It features a steeply pitched, multi-gabled roof and paneled chimneys.

It was listed on the National Register of Historic Places in 1982.
