= Guilderland (hamlet), New York =

Guilderland, New York
- Hamlet
- Location within New York Location within the United States
- Coordinates: 42°42′14″N 73°54′43″W
- Country: United States
- State: New York
- Region: Capital District
- County: Albany
- Town: Guilderland
- Settled: 1796
- Time zone: UTC-5 (EST)
  - Summer (DST): UTC-4 (EDT)
- ZIP Code: 12084
- Area code: 518

Guilderland is a hamlet of the town of the same name in Albany County, New York, United States.

== History ==
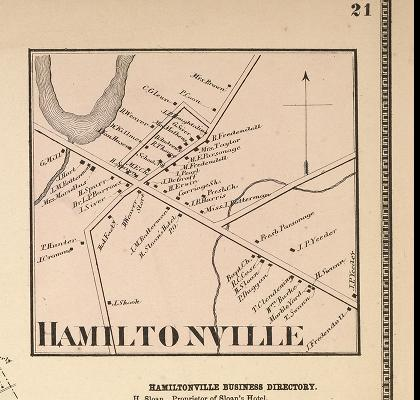
Map of Hamiltonville in 1866.

The hamlet of Guilderland was begun as a glass factory in 1792, often referred to as the "Glass House". This factory was in the middle of the wilderness of the Pine Bush pine barrens, in an area then called Dowesburgh. In 1796, with hopes of establishing a manufacturing village, streets and lots were laid out and sold, and 54 houses built for the factory workers. This little village was named Hamilton for Secretary of Treasury Alexander Hamilton, an Albany native and a Founding Father of the United States. When the Great Western Turnpike was built through the hamlet in 1799 connecting Albany to the western frontier, Hamilton became the home to several taverns and other businesses catering to the pioneers. The glass works here folded in 1815, ending the hopes of this place becoming a major factory town. Hamilton would get its first post office in 1815 as well, the post office though would take the name Guilderland instead, and the community would come to be known locally as Sloan's, for the owner of the major hotel here. The Hamilton name continues to live on in the name of a Presbyterian church, the Hamilton Union Presbyterian Church that was founded in 1824.

== Geography ==
As a hamlet, Guilderland has ill-defined boundaries, but is generally considered to be along US Route 20 (Western Avenue) between New York Route 155 (State Farm Road/New Karner Road) and New York Route 146 (south-leg to Altamont).

== Important locations ==
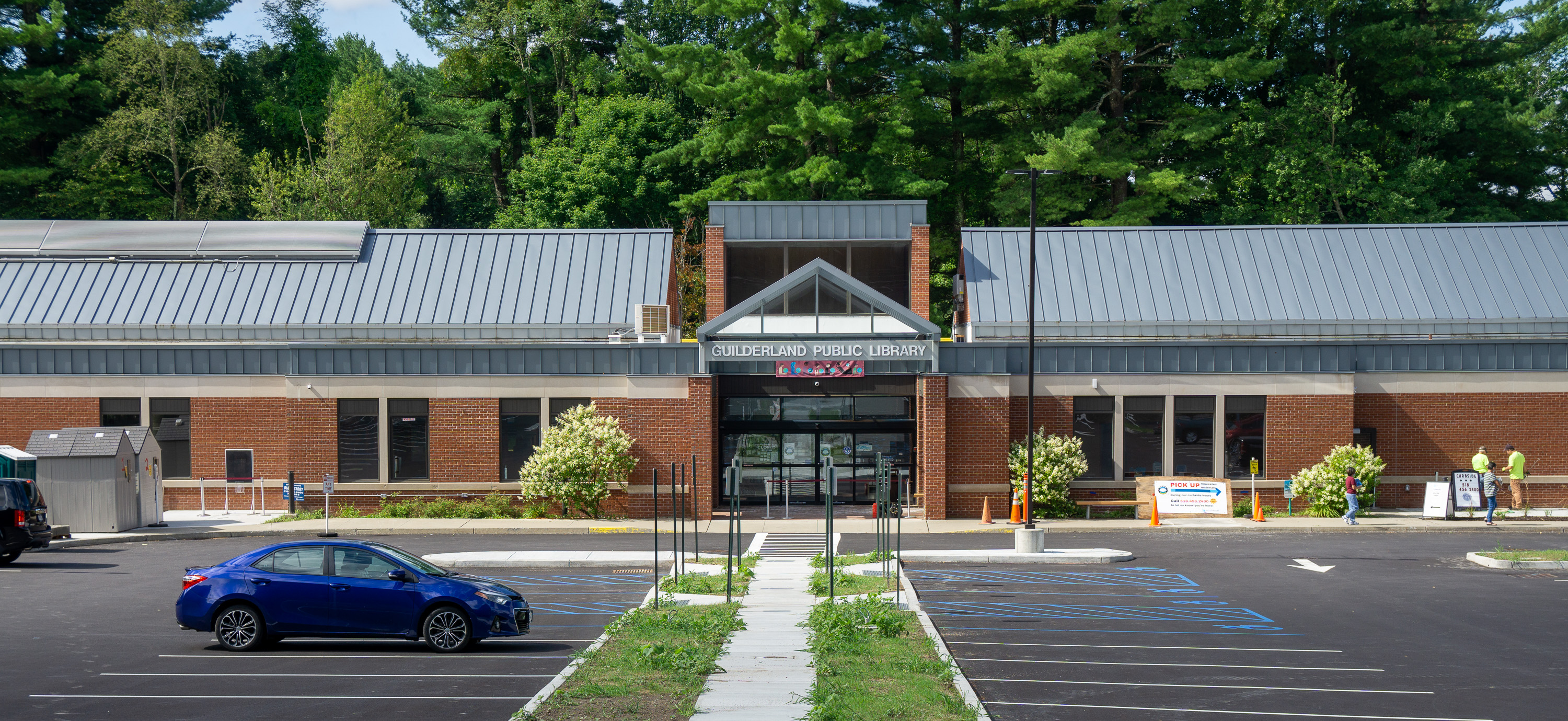
Guilderland Public Library, on Western Avenue

- Prospect Hill Cemetery
- Guilderland Elementary School
- Guilderland Public Library
- Guilderland YMCA
- Western Turnpike Golf Course

== See also ==
- Albany Glassworks Site
