= Adam Hilton House =

Historic house in New York, United States

- U.S. National Register of Historic Places
- Location within New York Location within the United States
- Location: 6073 Leesome Ln., Guilderland, New York
- Coordinates: 42°41′31″N 74°2′19″W
- Area: 4.2 acres (1.7 ha)
- Built: 1800
- MPS: Guilderland MRA
- NRHP reference No.: 82001071
- Added to NRHP: November 10, 1982

The Adam Hilton House is a historic house located at 6073 Leesome Lane in Guilderland, Albany County, New York.

== Description and history ==
It was built about 1800 and is a substantial, two-story stone farmhouse, five bays wide with a gable roof. The wood-framed addition and front porch were added about 1860.

It was listed on the National Register of Historic Places on November 10, 1982.
