= Gifford Grange Hall =

- U.S. National Register of Historic Places
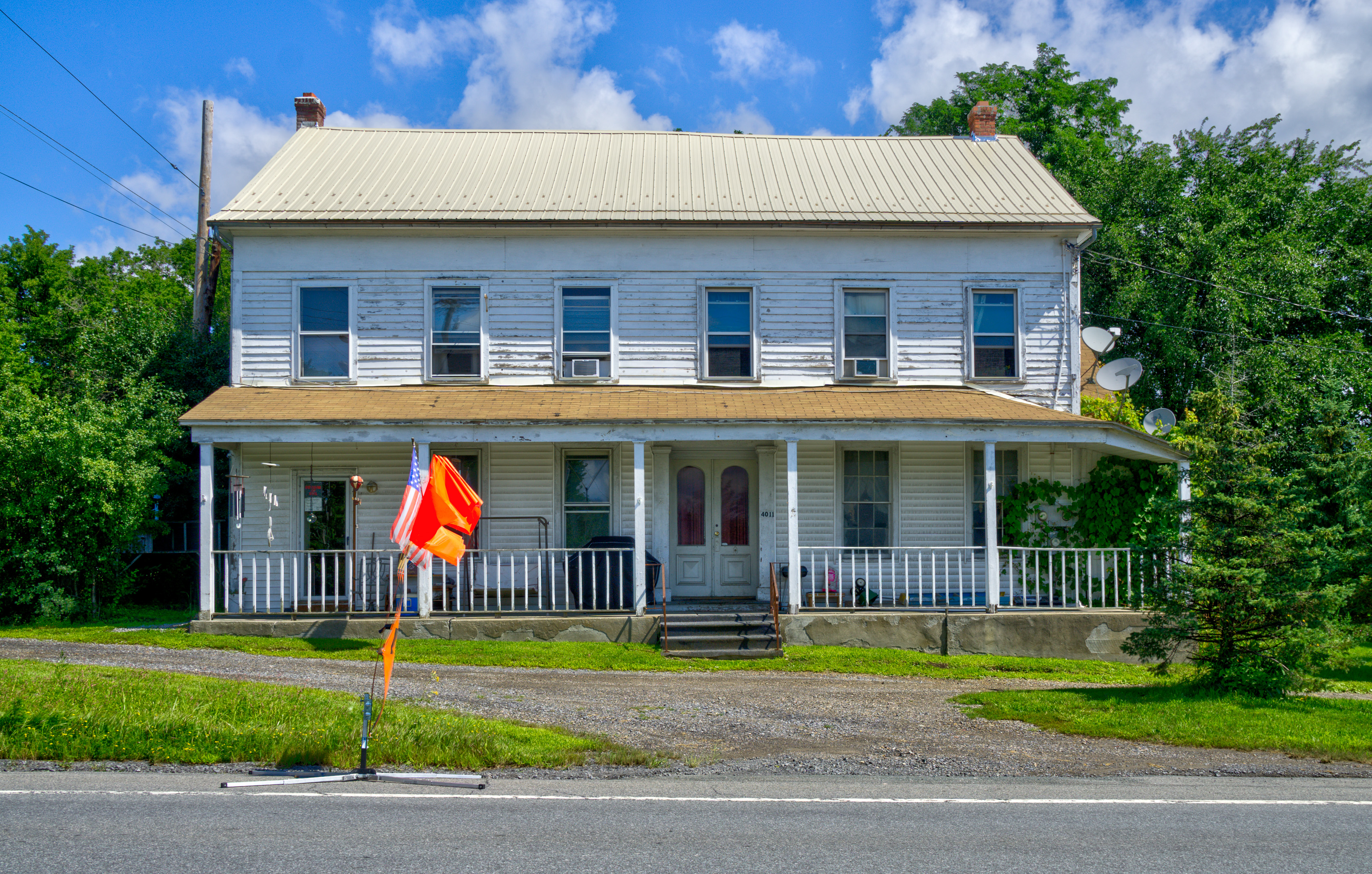

- Location within New York Location within the United States
- Location: 4011 Western Ave., Guilderland, New York
- Coordinates: 42°44′23″N 74°0′54″W
- Area: 2.4 acres (0.97 ha)
- Built: 1866
- MPS: Guilderland MRA
- NRHP reference No.: 82001065
- Added to NRHP: November 10, 1982

The Gifford Grange Hall is a historic Grange hall located in Guilderland, Albany County, New York. It was built about 1866 as a general store and post office. It is a plain, two story frame commercial building with a one-story porch across the front with a shed roof.

It was listed on the National Register of Historic Places in 1982.

== See also ==
- National Register of Historic Places listings in Albany County, New York
