= Schoolhouse No. 6 =

- Schoolhouse #6
- U.S. National Register of Historic Places
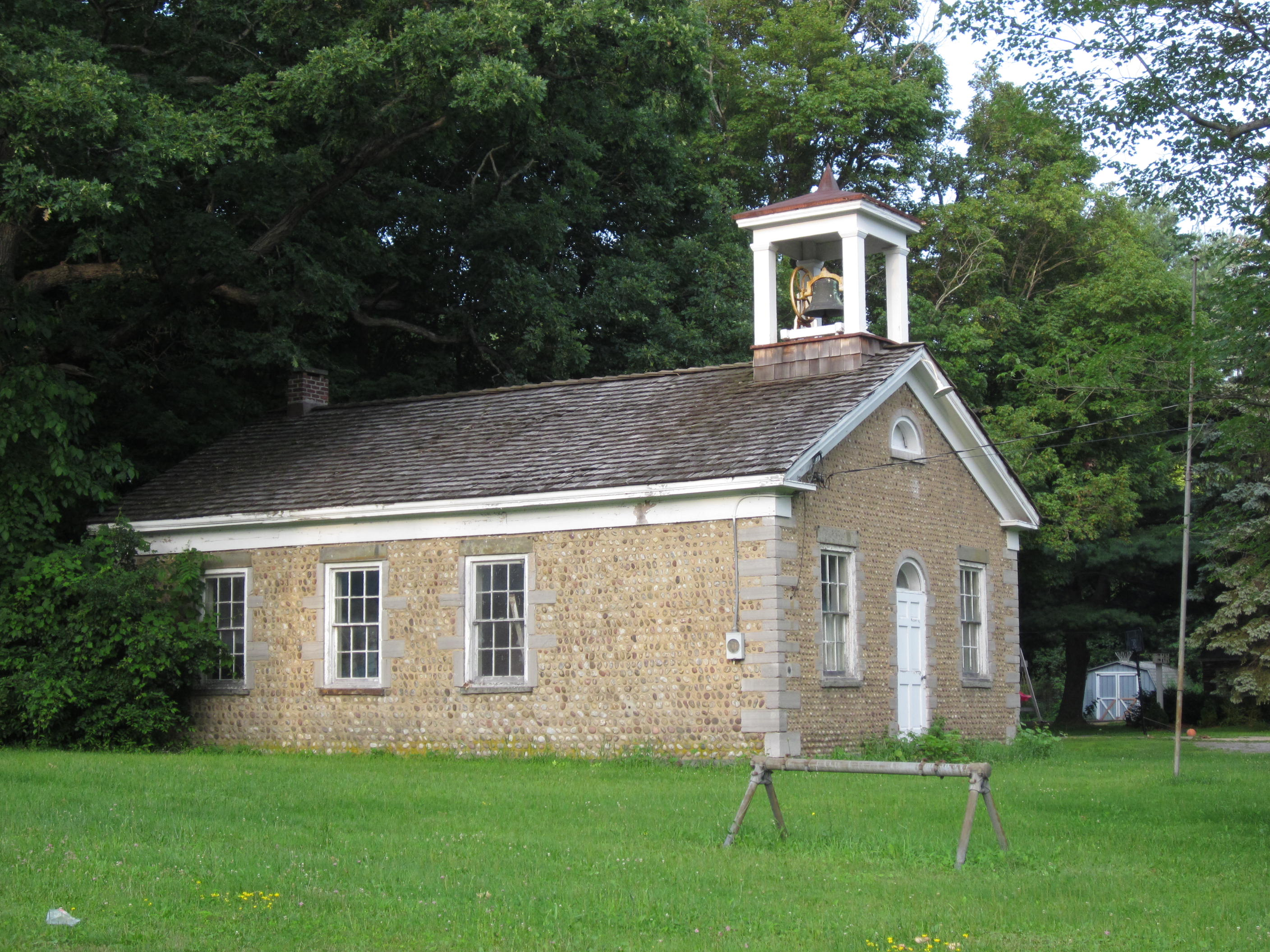
- Schoolhouse No. 6, July 2011

- Location within New York Location within the United States
- Location: 206 Main St., Guilderland, New York
- Coordinates: 42°42′14″N 73°58′8″W
- Area: 1.3 acres (0.53 ha)
- Built: 1860
- MPS: Guilderland MRA
- NRHP reference No.: 82001082
- Added to NRHP: November 10, 1982

Schoolhouse No. 6 is a historic one room school building located at Guilderland in Albany County, New York. It was built in 1860 and is a one-story cobblestone building built of coursed cobblestones with smooth ashlar quoins. It features a curvilinear hipped roof topped by an open bell tower. Also on the property is a contributing privy.

It was listed on the National Register of Historic Places in 1982.
