= Veeder Farmhouse No. 2 =

Historic house in New York, United States

- Veeder Farmhouse #2
- U.S. National Register of Historic Places
- Location within New York Location within the United States
- Location: 3858 Western Tpk, Guilderland, New York
- Coordinates: 42°44′33″N 74°1′39″W
- Area: 1.5 acres (0.61 ha)
- Built: 1830
- Architectural style: Greek Revival
- MPS: Guilderland MRA
- NRHP reference No.: 82001088
- Added to NRHP: November 10, 1982

Veeder Farmhouse #2 is a historic home located at Guilderland in Albany County, New York. It was built about 1830 and is a two-story frame building on a cut stone foundation in the Greek Revival style. There is a one-story rear ell. It features a recessed center entrance with sidelights and transom. It is a "sister" house to the Veeder Farmhouse No. 1.

It was listed on the National Register of Historic Places in 1982.
