= Stephen Pangburn House =

Historic house in New York, United States

- U.S. National Register of Historic Places
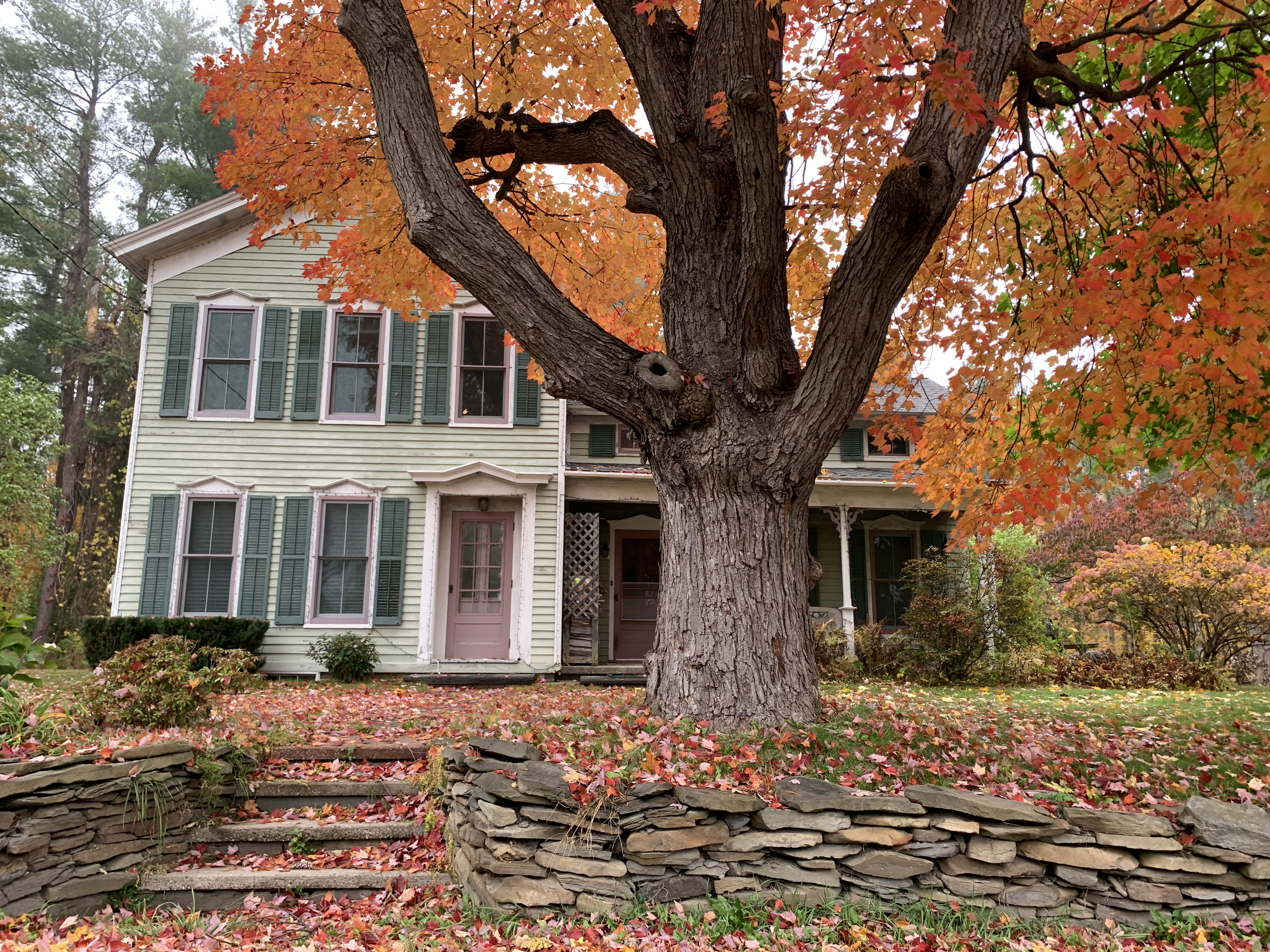
- Exterior view, October 2020

- Location within New York Location within the United States
- Location: 2357 Old State, Guilderland, New York
- Coordinates: 42°44′35″N 73°58′58″W
- Area: 3.6 acres (1.5 ha)
- Built: 1864
- MPS: Guilderland MRA
- NRHP reference No.: 82001076
- Added to NRHP: November 10, 1982

Stephen Pangburn House is a historic home located at Guilderland in Albany County, New York. It was built in 1864 and is a two-story frame farmhouse with one story ell. It features attic story eyebrow windows on the ell and unusual pedimented lintels at the windows and doors.

It was listed on the National Register of Historic Places in 1982.
