= Van Patten Barn Complex =

- U.S. National Register of Historic Places
- Location within New York Location within the United States
- Location: 4773 Western Tpk., Guilderland, New York
- Coordinates: 42°43′35″N 73°57′51″W
- Area: 3.7 acres (1.5 ha)
- Built: 1790
- Architectural style: Dutch H-framing
- MPS: Guilderland MRA
- NRHP reference No.: 82001086
- Added to NRHP: November 10, 1982

Van Patten Barn Complex is a historic barn complex located at Guilderland in Albany County, New York. The complex consists of a Dutch barn built about 1700 and two English barns built about 1830.

It was listed on the National Register of Historic Places in 1982.
