= Norman Vale =

Historic house in New York, United States

- U.S. National Register of Historic Places
- Location within New York Location within the United States
- Location: 6030 Nott Rd., Guilderland, New York
- Coordinates: 42°41′21.48″N 73°54′19.72″W
- Area: 9.1 acres (3.7 ha)
- Built: 1790
- Architectural style: Colonial Revival
- NRHP reference No.: 09001079
- Added to NRHP: December 11, 2009

Norman Vale, also known as the Nott House, is a historic home located at Guilderland in Albany County, New York. It is a three-part home comprising a 2 1/2-story center section with a steeply pitched roof, flanked by 1 1/2-story wings. It was built about 1790 and owned by members of the Nott family until 1977. In the 1930s, the house was remodeled in the Colonial Revival style.

It was listed on the National Register of Historic Places in 2009.
