= Coppola House =

Historic house in New York, United States

- U.S. National Register of Historic Places
- Location within New York Location within the United States
- Location: Leesome Ln., Guilderland, New York
- Coordinates: 42°41′28″N 74°2′32″W
- Area: 4.2 acres (1.7 ha)
- Built: 1910
- Architectural style: Colonial Revival
- MPS: Guilderland MRA
- NRHP reference No.: 82001058
- Added to NRHP: November 10, 1982

The Coppola House is a historic home located at Guilderland in Albany County, New York. It was built about 1910 and is a three-story frame residence in the Colonial Revival style. It features a gambrel roof with gables and dormers, a Palladian window, and a one-story surrounding porch with porte cochere.

It was listed on the National Register of Historic Places in 1982.
