= Sharp Farmhouse =

Historic house in New York, United States

- U.S. National Register of Historic Places
- Location within New York Location within the United States
- Location: 4379 Western Tpk., Guilderland, New York
- Coordinates: 42°44′10″N 73°59′20″W
- Area: 4.1 acres (1.7 ha)
- Built: 1875
- Architectural style: Stick/Eastlake
- MPS: Guilderland MRA
- NRHP reference No.: 82001084
- Added to NRHP: November 10, 1982

Sharp Farmhouse is a historic home located at Guilderland in Albany County, New York. It was built around 1875 and is a two-story, L-shaped building with Stick/Eastlake style detailing. It features a gable roof with carved, exposed framing and a small ocular window.

It was listed on the National Register of Historic Places in 1982.
