= Fuller's Tavern =

Historic commercial building in New York, United States

- U.S. National Register of Historic Places
- Location within New York Location within the United States
- Location: 6861 Western Tpk., Guilderland, New York
- Coordinates: 42°43′12″N 73°57′26″W
- Area: 1.8 acres (0.73 ha)
- Built: 1795
- MPS: Guilderland MRA
- NRHP reference No.: 82001063
- Added to NRHP: November 10, 1982

Fuller's Tavern is a historic inn and tavern located at Guilderland in Albany County, New York. It was built about 1795 and is a two-story wood-frame house with a "saltbox" roof. It opened as a tavern house in 1806 and is one of the few remaining inns of those built along the Great Western Turnpike in the late 18th century.

It was listed on the National Register of Historic Places in 1982.
