= Hamilton Union Church Rectory =

Historic house in New York, United States

- U.S. National Register of Historic Places
- Location within New York Location within the United States
- Location: 2267 Western Tpk., Guilderland, New York
- Coordinates: 42°42′10″N 73°54′27″W
- Area: less than one acre
- Built: 1857
- Architectural style: Greek Revival
- MPS: Guilderland MRA
- NRHP reference No.: 82001068
- Added to NRHP: November 10, 1982

Hamilton Union Church Rectory is a historic church rectory at 2267 Western Turnpike in Guilderland, Albany County, New York. It was built in 1857 and is in the Greek Revival style.

It was listed on the National Register of Historic Places in 1982.
