= Rose Hill (Guilderland, New York) =

Historic house in New York, United States

- U.S. National Register of Historic Places
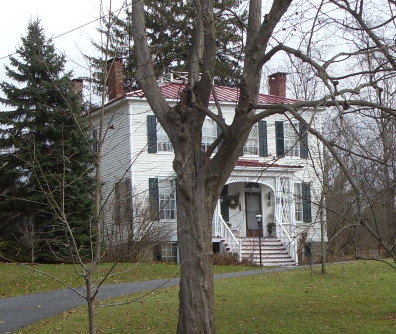
- Rose Hill, November 2008

- Location within New York Location within the United States
- Location: 2259 Western Tpk., Guilderland, New York
- Coordinates: 42°42′9″N 73°54′20″W
- Area: 28.4 acres (11.5 ha)
- Built: 1800
- Architectural style: Federal
- MPS: Guilderland MRA
- NRHP reference No.: 82001079
- Added to NRHP: November 10, 1982

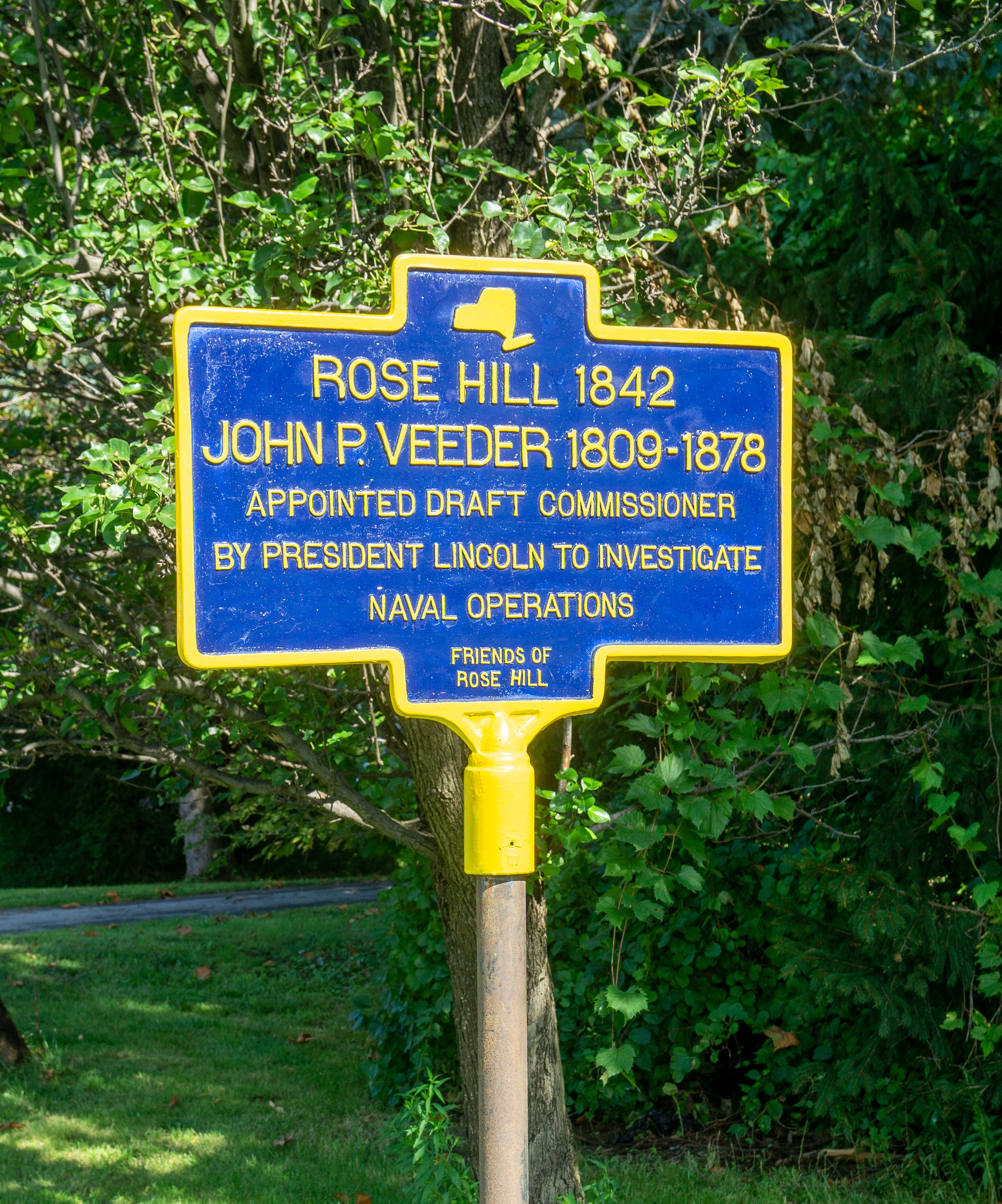
Rose Hill historical marker

Rose Hill is a historic home located at Guilderland in Albany County, New York. It was built about 1840, and is a two-story Federal style dwelling. It has a hipped roof crowned by a balustrade and symmetrically placed chimneys. It features a central front porch with Latticework decoration. It was built by Volkert Veeder, agent for Stephen Van Rensselaer and active worker in colonizing the town. Also on the property is a barn, privy, and shed.

It was listed on the National Register of Historic Places in 1982.
