= Freeman House (Guilderland, New York) =

Historic house in New York, United States

- U.S. National Register of Historic Places
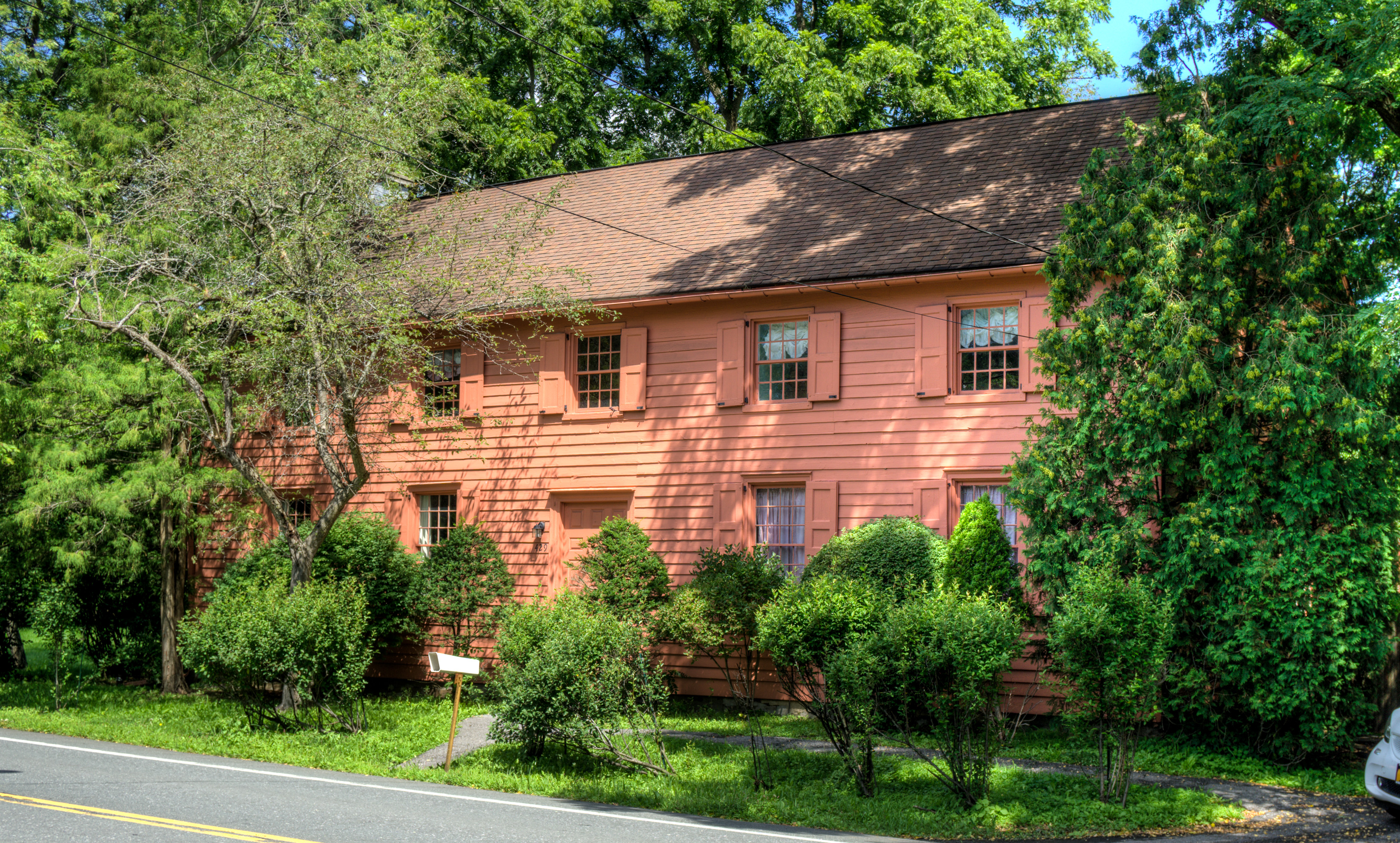

- Location within New York Location within the United States
- Location: 136 Main St., Guilderland, New York
- Coordinates: 42°42′8″N 73°57′50″W
- Area: 1.7 acres (0.69 ha)
- Built: ca. 1734
- Architectural style: Colonial
- MPS: Guilderland MRA
- NRHP reference No.: 82001062
- Added to NRHP: November 10, 1982

Freeman House is a historic home located at Guilderland in Albany County, New York. The original house (the center and eastern section) was built about 1734; a western addition was built about 1750; and a rear ell was added about 1800. It is a two-story Dutch Colonial house with a gable roof and built of large, smooth finished beams. It is one of the finest and oldest colonial period buildings in Guilderland, and may be the oldest frame house in Guilderland.

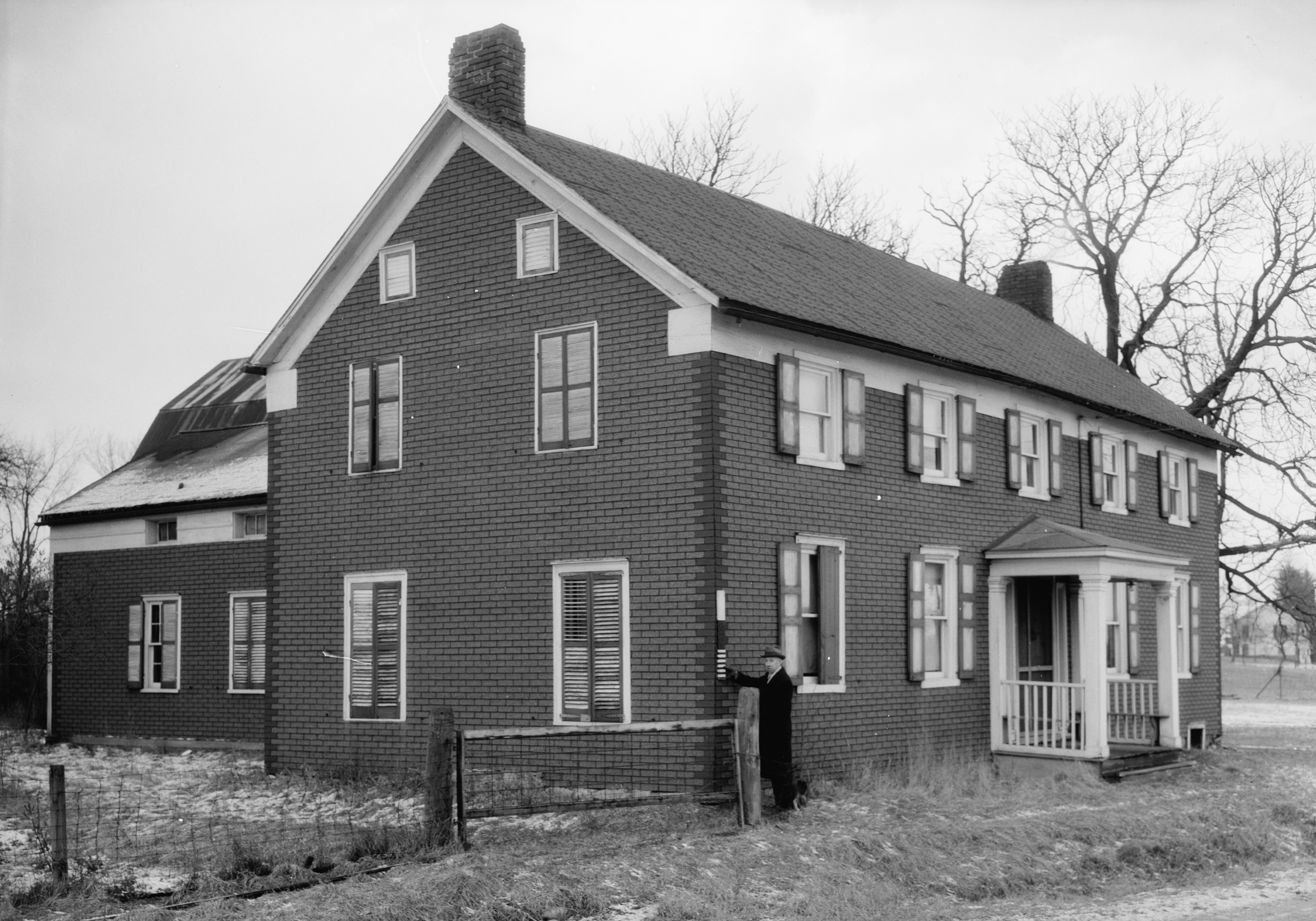
The house in 1937, with synthetic brick siding

Following the American Revolution, the home belonged to Revolutionary War veteran Barent Mynderse.

When photographer Nelson E. Baldwin photographed the house in 1937 as part of the Historic American Buildings Survey, it was covered in a synthetic brick siding, which has since been removed. A historic marker stands in front of the house.

It was listed on the National Register of Historic Places in 1982.

== See also ==
- National Register of Historic Places listings in Albany County, New York
