= Albany Glassworks Site =

- U.S. National Register of Historic Places
- Nearest city: Guilderland, New York
- Area: 2 acres (0.81 ha)
- Built: 1785
- NRHP reference No.: 80002583
- Added to NRHP: July 22, 1980

The Albany Glassworks Site is an archeological site in Guilderland, Albany County, New York. Approximately 2 acres (0.81 ha) in size, it was listed on the National Register of Historic Places in 1980.

== History ==
The site is a historic industrial site that was in use from 1785 to 1815. The Albany Glassworks is believed to be one of the earliest glassworks operating in the United States. The glassworks was founded by Leonard de Neufville, who recruited experienced glass workers from the Palatinate region of Germany. The Glasshouse was located near the banks of the Hungerskill river just south of the stage road leading eastward towards Albany. Dowesburgh (now Guilderland), N.Y., was still a wilderness area in the Pine Bush pine barrens, but it had all the raw material necessary for the manufacture of glass along with the necessary wood for the furnaces and potash.

Construction of the new factory began in the winter of 1786. The company made hollow ware (utility bottles) but the main output was window glass. In December 1787 Jean de Neufville wrote to Colonel Clement Dibble of Philadelphia, that "the glass house comes very well, ... of course during the winter months exports to New York must be discontinued, while navigation on the Hudson was closed."

The original Glasshouse went bankrupt in 1791, and was taken over by four Albany businessmen, James Caldwell, Christopher Batterman, Robert McClallen, and Robert MacGregor who called it "The Albany Glasshouse". In 1793 they obtained a loan of £3,000 from the New York State Legislature.

In 1793 the firm advertised a reward of $50 for identification of any nearby source of sand suitable for use as raw material in glass making. Also, "Clay for making crucibles and sand for making glass were brought to Albany from Amboy and Port Elizabeth, New Jersey." In the year 1795, the Glass House was reorganized as McGregor & Co.

In 1796, with hopes of establishing a manufacturing village, streets and lots were laid out and sold, and 54 houses built for the factory workers. The village was named Hamilton for Secretary of Treasury Alexander Hamilton. The company was then called "The Hamilton Glass Works". It was subsequently owned by Patroon Jeremiah Van Rensselaer and the Schoolcraft family. By 1813, output had grown to 500,000 feet of window glass per year. Alexander Hamilton, and General Philip Schuyler both held large financial interest in the glass-making factory. The glass works here folded in 1815.

== Archeology ==
The archeological site was identified to an archeologist in 1961 and was investigated in digs in 1963 and later. At the time of the National Register nomination, several archeological studies had been completed. The main melting furnace was located.

== See also ==
- 18th century glassmaking in the United States
