= Charles Parker House =

Historic house in New York, United States

- U.S. National Register of Historic Places
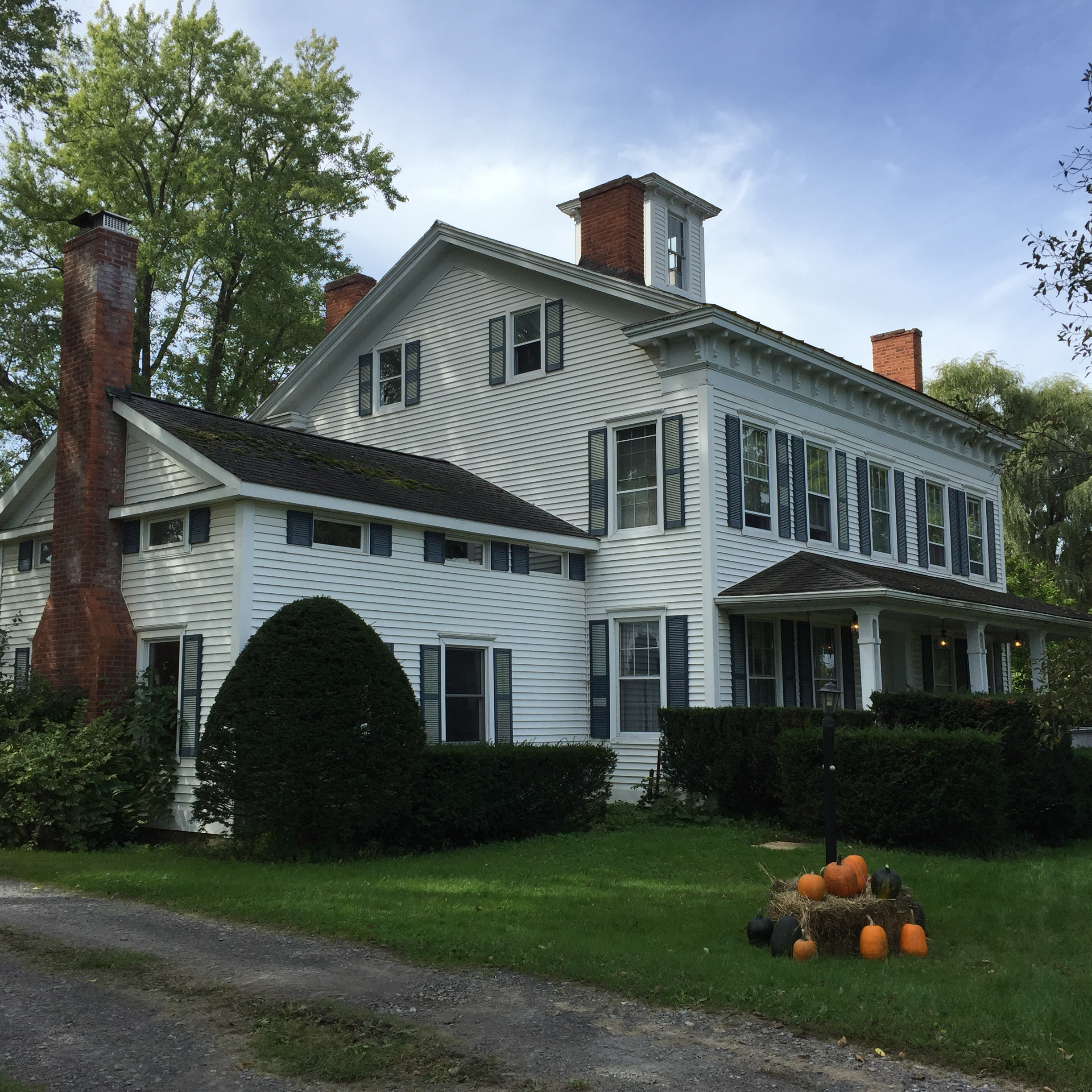

- Location within New York Location within the United States
- Location: 2273 Old State; Guilderland, New York
- Coordinates: 42°44′31″N 73°59′21″W
- Area: 41 acres (17 ha)
- Built: 1844
- Architectural style: Italianate
- MPS: Guilderland MRA
- NRHP reference No.: 82001077
- Added to NRHP: November 10, 1982

Charles Parker House is a historic home located at Guilderland in Albany County, New York. It was built in 1844 and is a large 2 1/2-story brick farmhouse in the Italianate style. It features a bracketed cornice, gable roof with lantern, and four symmetrically placed chimneys.

It was listed on the National Register of Historic Places in 1982.
