= Hamilton Union Presbyterian Church =

Historic church in New York, United States

- U.S. National Register of Historic Places
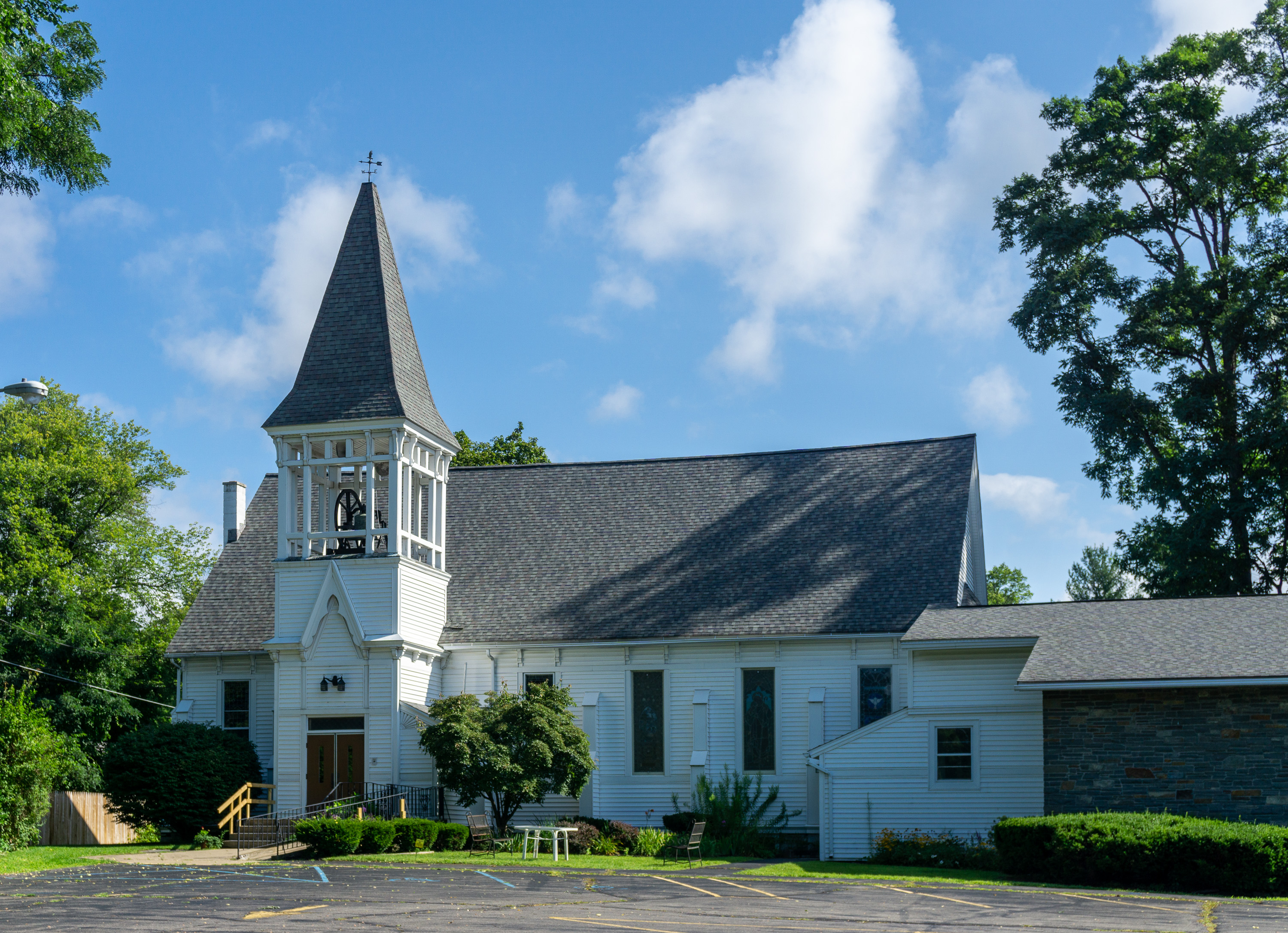

- Location within New York Location within the United States
- Location: 2291 Western Tpk., Guilderland, New York
- Coordinates: 42°42′14″N 73°54′32″W
- Area: less than one acre
- Built: 1886
- Architect: Howe, August; multiple
- Architectural style: Stick/Eastlake
- MPS: Guilderland MRA
- NRHP reference No.: 82001069
- Added to NRHP: November 10, 1982

Hamilton Union Presbyterian Church is a historic Presbyterian church at 2291 Western Turnpike in Guilderland, Albany County, New York.

== Background ==
It was built in 1886 and is in the Eastlake / Stick style. It features a large, open bell tower on the south side. The structure incorporates buttresses to compensate for the lack of roof trusses.

It was listed on the National Register of Historic Places in 1982.
