= Apple Tavern =

Historic commercial building in New York, United States

- U.S. National Register of Historic Places
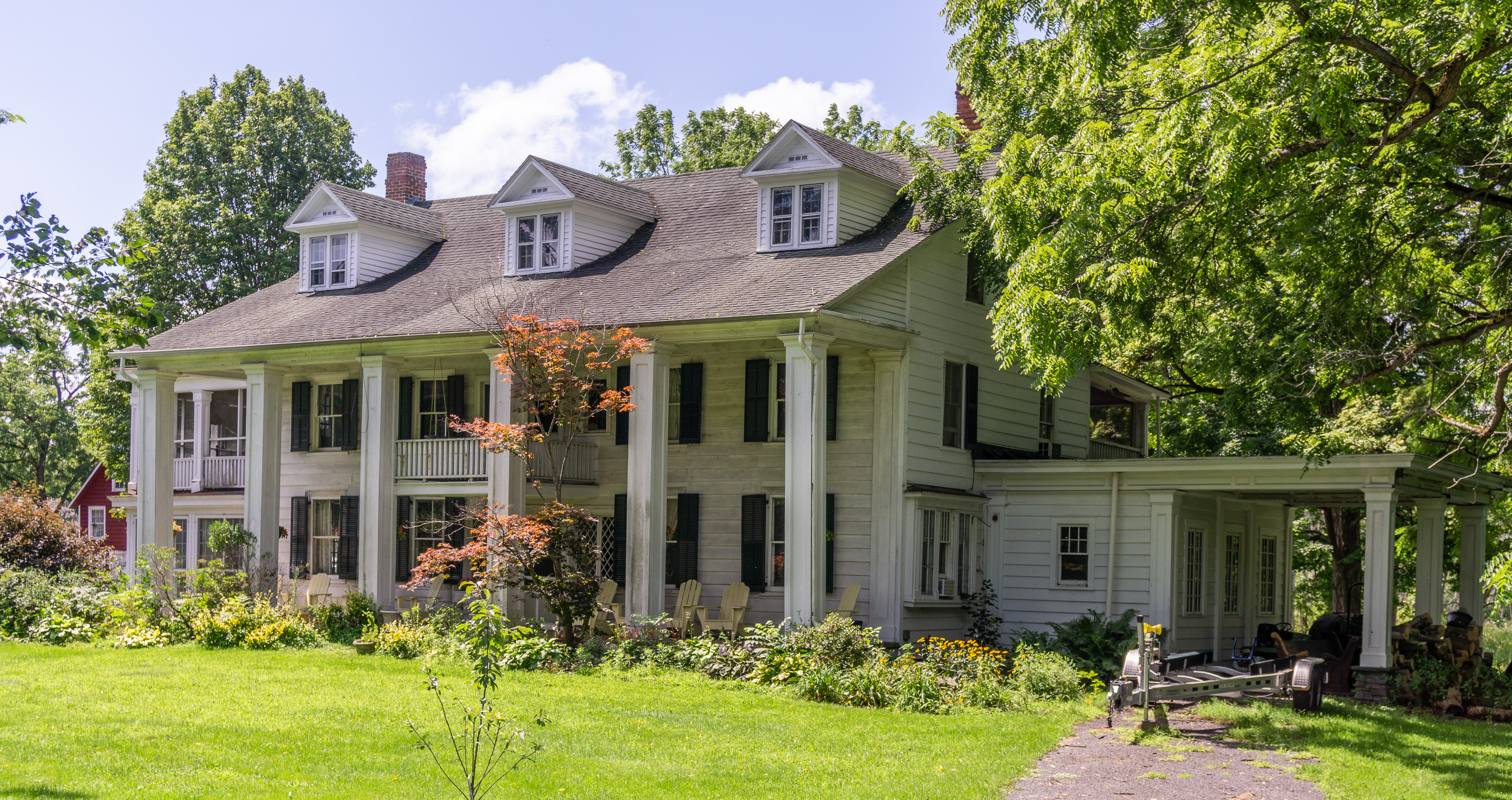

- Location within New York Location within the United States
- Location: 4450 Altamont Rd., Guilderland, New York
- Coordinates: 42°42′37″N 73°58′28″W
- Area: 6.3 acres (2.5 ha)
- Built: 1760
- MPS: Guilderland MRA
- NRHP reference No.: 82001055
- Added to NRHP: November 10, 1982

The Apple Tavern in Guilderland, New York was built in 1760 (or 1765). It was listed on the National Register of Historic Places in 1982. The listing included four contributing buildings on a 6.3-acre (2.5 ha) area.

Apple Tavern / Appel Inn
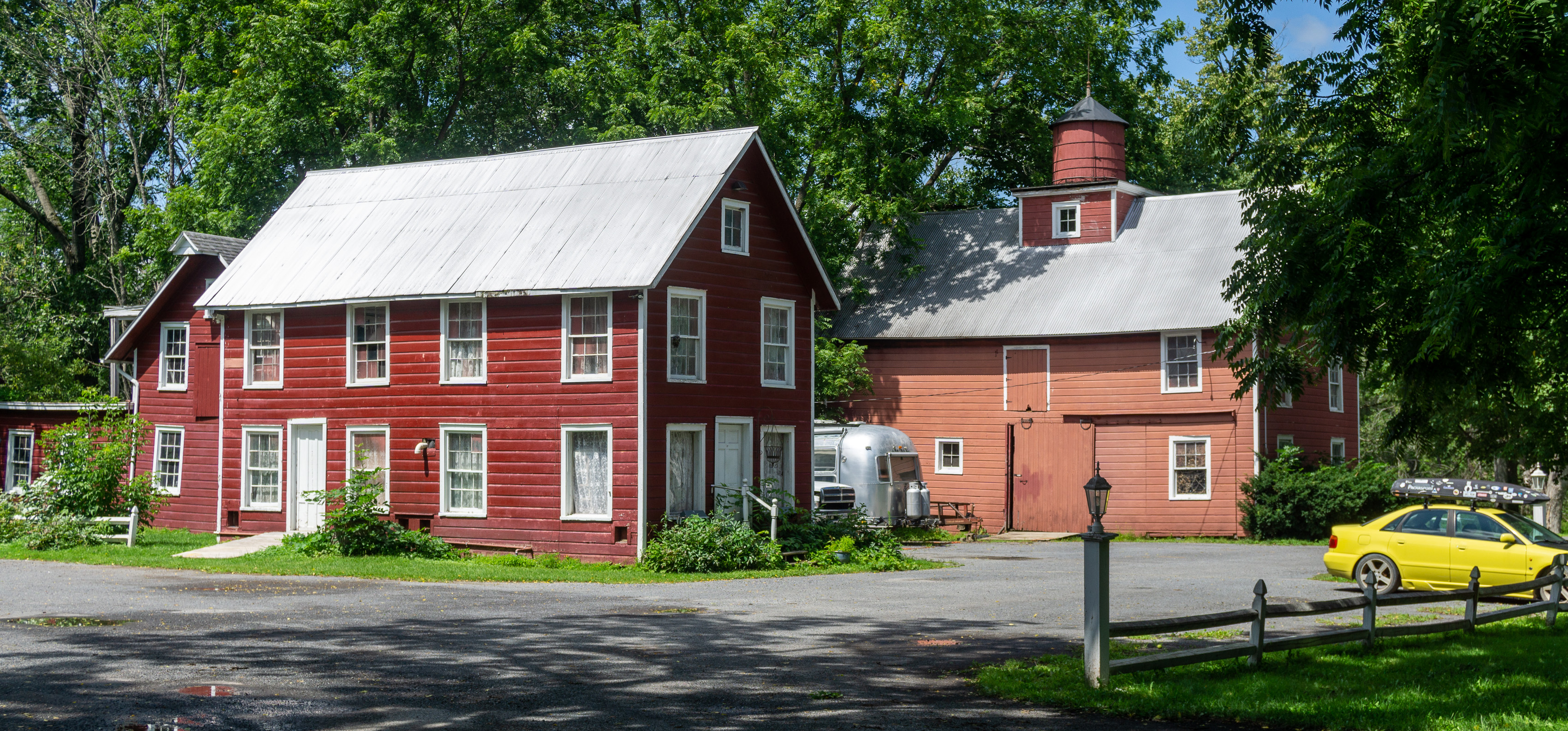
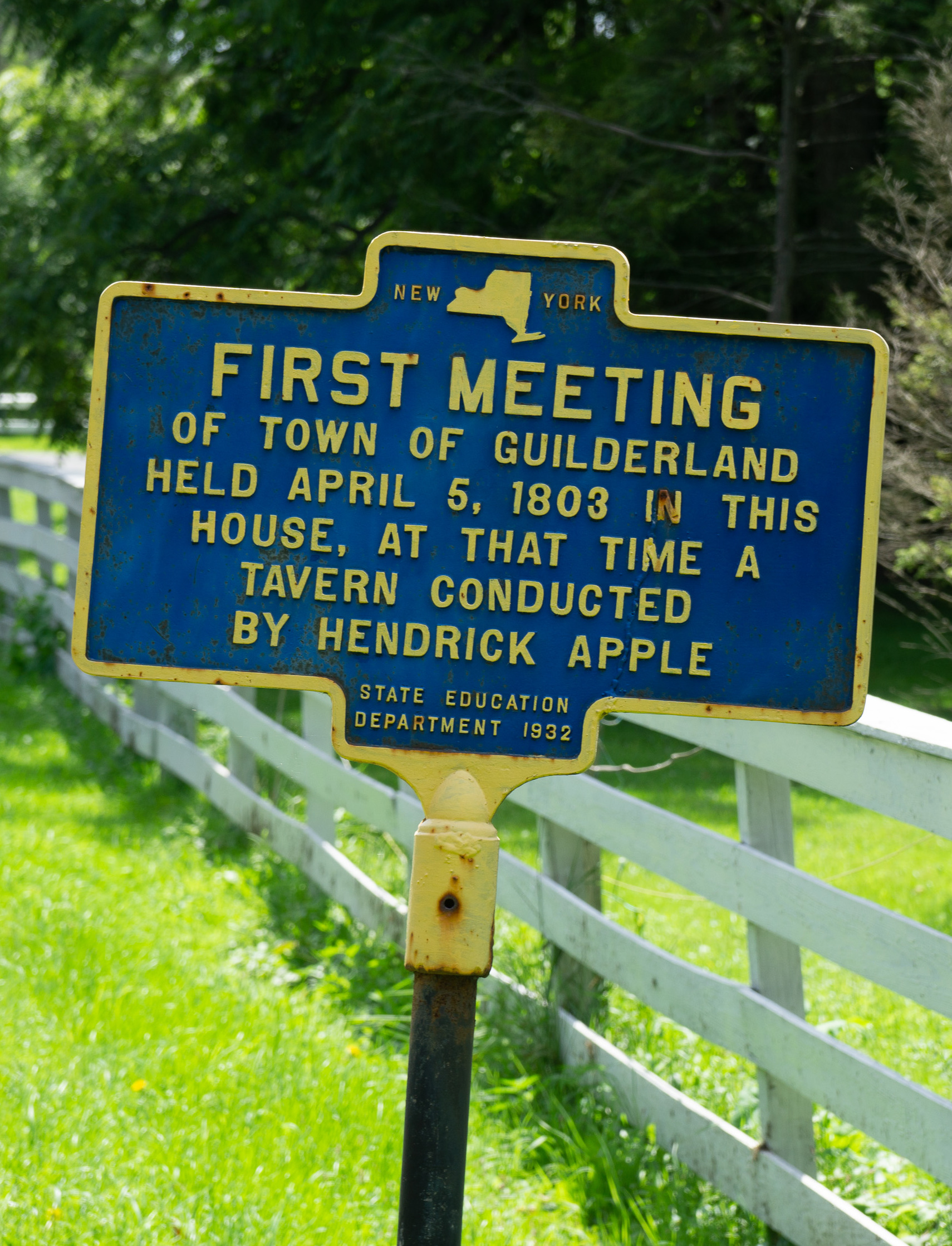
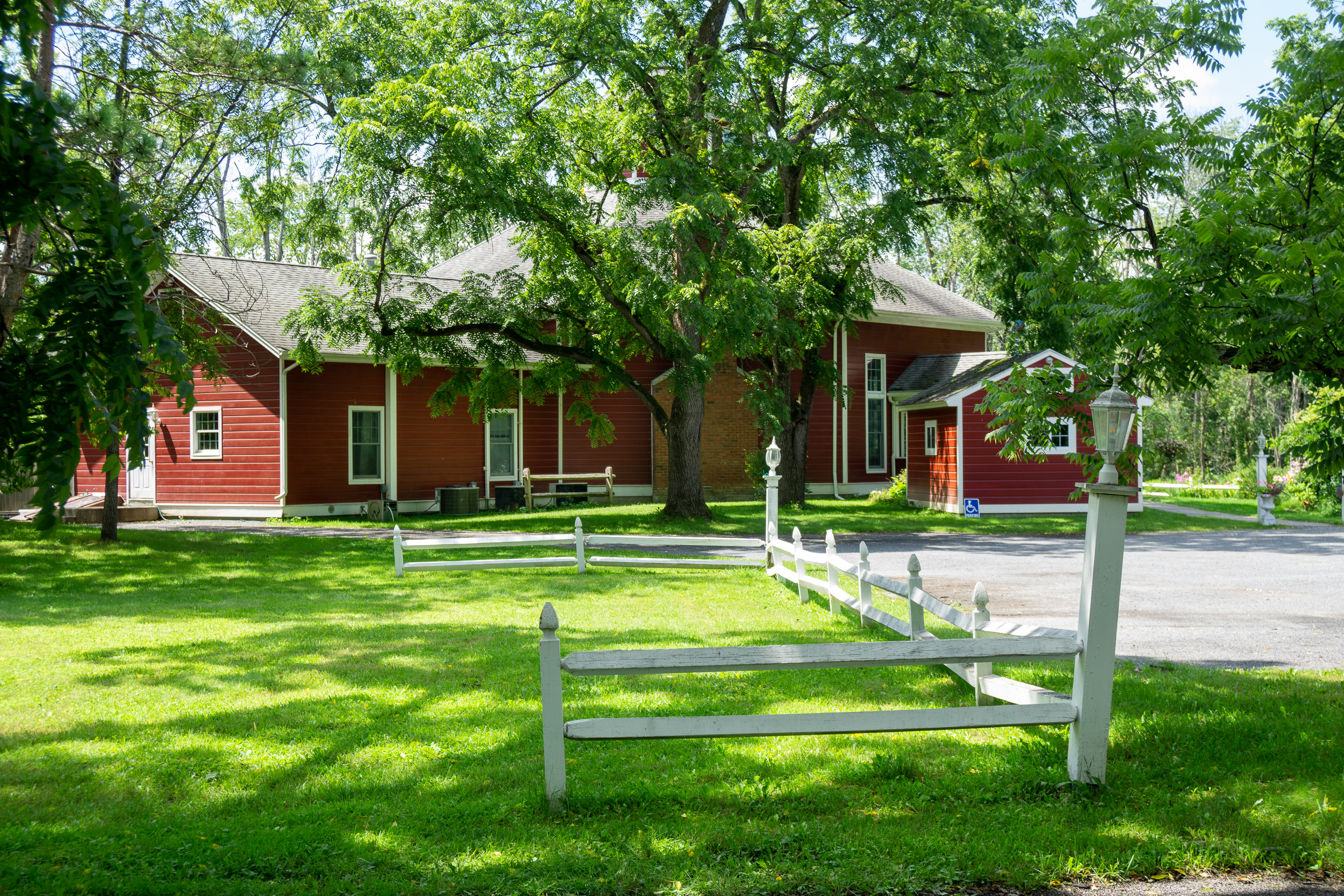

The tavern was built in 1760 (or 1765) on what was, or became, the Schoharie Turnpike or Schoharie Road or Old Schoharie Road. Its original owners were owners Hendrick (Henry) Appel and his wife, Eve. It was renovated significantly in the 19th century. In 1803 it was the site of meeting to form the town of Guilderland.

In the 1980s and later it has been operated as a bed and breakfast, antique shop, and wedding and event venue known as the Appel Inn.

== See also ==
- National Register of Historic Places listings in Albany County, New York
