= Houck Farmhouse =

Historic house in New York, United States

- U.S. National Register of Historic Places
- Location within New York Location within the United States
- Location: 6156 Ostrander Rd., Guilderland, New York
- Coordinates: 42°41′53″N 73°56′48″W
- Area: 5 acres (2.0 ha)
- Built: 1850
- Architectural style: Greek Revival
- MPS: Guilderland MRA
- NRHP reference No.: 82001072
- Added to NRHP: November 10, 1982

Houck Farmhouse is a historic home located at Guilderland in Albany County, New York. It was built circa 1850 and is a two-story frame farmhouse with a 1 1/2-story ell in the Greek Revival style. The ell features eyebrow windows and has an enclosed pedimented portico.

It was listed on the National Register of Historic Places in 1982.
