= Jacob Crouse Inn =

- U.S. National Register of Historic Places
- Location within New York Location within the United States
- Location: 3933 Altamont Rd., Guilderland, New York
- Coordinates: 42°42′18″N 74°1′10″W
- Area: 1.1 acres (0.45 ha)
- Built: 1833
- MPS: Guilderland MRA
- NRHP reference No.: 82001060
- Added to NRHP: November 10, 1982

The Jacob Crounse Inn is a historic inn located at Guilderland in Albany County, New York. The original building was built about 1833 and is a rectangular structure with a gable roof. Around 1870 it was enlarged with the addition of a central gable wing and one story porch. It features a large square cupola at the intersection of the gable roofs.

It was listed on the National Register of Historic Places in 1982.
