= John and Henry Crouse Farm Complex =

Historic house in New York, United States

- U.S. National Register of Historic Places
- Location within New York Location within the United States
- Location: 3970 Altamont-Voorheesville Rd., Guilderland, New York
- Coordinates: 42°40′33″N 74°1′1″W
- Area: 25.2 acres (10.2 ha)
- Built: 1790
- MPS: Guilderland MRA
- NRHP reference No.: 82001061
- Added to NRHP: November 10, 1982

John and Henry Crouse Farm Complex (This is misspelled. Actual spelling is Crounse) is a historic home and farm complex located at Guilderland in Albany County, New York. The original house was built about 1790 and became the rear wing when the large, two-story front addition was constructed about 1860. It features a shed roofed portico with lattice supports. Also on the property are a barn and a shed that was used as a tannery.

It was listed on the National Register of Historic Places in 1982.
