= Gardner House (Guilderland, New York) =

Historic house in New York, United States

- U.S. National Register of Historic Places
- Location within New York Location within the United States
- Location: 5661 Gardner Rd., Guilderland, New York
- Coordinates: 42°40′19″N 74°0′4″W
- Area: 5 acres (2.0 ha)
- Built: 1875
- Architectural style: Second Empire
- MPS: Guilderland MRA
- NRHP reference No.: 82001064
- Added to NRHP: November 10, 1982

Gardner House is a historic home located at Guilderland in Albany County, New York. It was built about 1875 and is a two-story Second Empire style farmhouse with a mansard roof and dormers. It features a one-story porch with carved and sawn brackets. Also on the property is a smoke house.

It was listed on the National Register of Historic Places in 1982.
