= Guilderland, New York =

- Town
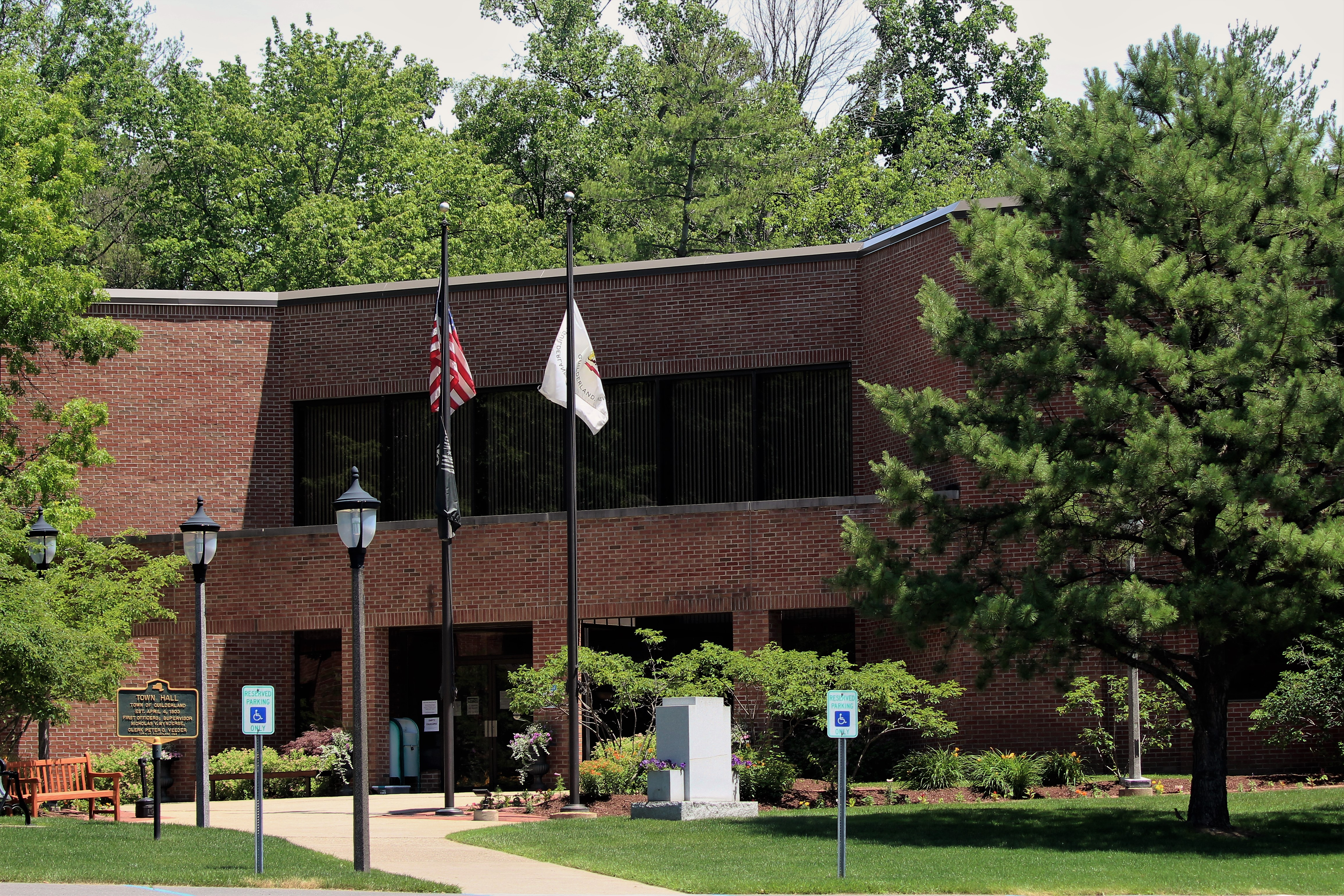
- Guilderland Town Hall

- Seal
- Etymology: Gelderland province in the Netherlands
- Motto: Prospice Gelria - Latin for Look Forward Guilderland
- Location in Albany County and New York.

- Location of New York in the United States
- Coordinates: 42°42′5″N 73°55′31″W
- Country: United States
- State: New York
- County: Albany
- Settled: c. 1700
- Incorporation as town: 1803

Government
  - Town supervisor: Peter G. Barber (D) Town Council: Patricia Slavick (D); Paul Pastore (D); Lee Carman (R); Rosemary Centi (D)

Area
  - Total: 58.79 sq mi (152.26 km^{2})
  - Land: 57.90 sq mi (149.97 km^{2})
  - Water: 0.88 sq mi (2.29 km^{2})
- Elevation: 328 ft (100 m)

Population (2020)
  - Total: 36,848
  - Density: 636/sq mi (245.7/km^{2})
- Time zone: UTC-5 (EST)
  - Summer (DST): UTC-4 (EDT)
- ZIP Codes: 12009 (Altamont); 12084 (Guilderland); 12085 (Guilderland Center); 12159 (Slingerlands); 12186 (Voorheesville); 12203 (Albany); 12222 (Albany); 12303 (Schenectady); 12306 (Rotterdam)
- Area codes: 518,838
- FIPS code: 36-001-31104
- FIPS code: 36-31104
- GNIS feature ID: 0979030
- Wikimedia Commons: Guilderland, New York
- Website: www.townofguilderland.gov

Guilderland is a town in Albany County, New York, United States. In the 2020 census, the town had a population of 36,848. The town is named for the Gelderland province in the Netherlands. The town of Guilderland is on the central-northwest border of the county. It is just west of Albany, the capital of the U.S. state of New York.

== History ==
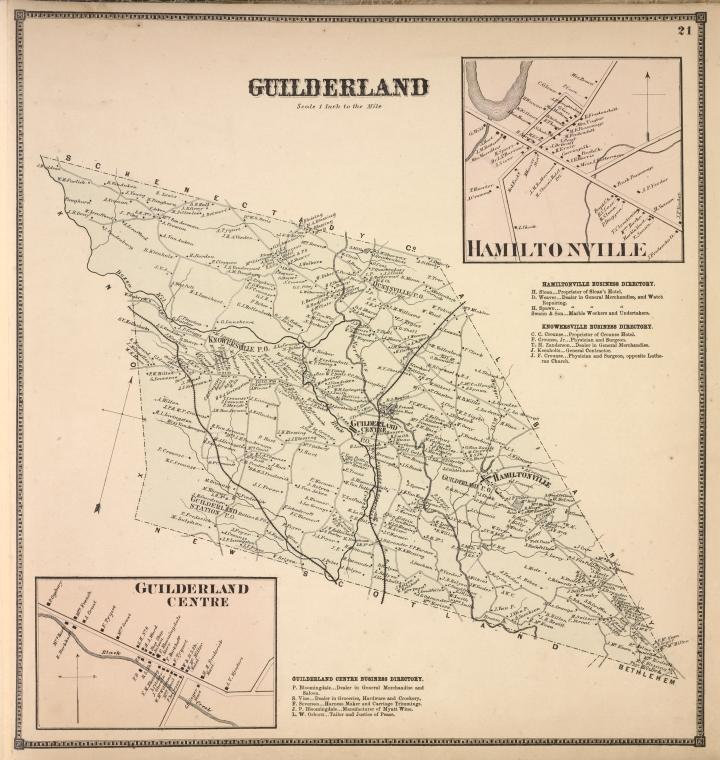
1866 map of Guilderland

Guilderland was originally a part of the Manor of Rensselaerswyck that Patroon Kiliaen van Rensselaer began in 1629 as part of the New Netherland colony. By the end of the 17th century, Dutch settlers from Albany and Schenectady began to establish farms in the area, beginning first along the banks of the Normans Kill. In 1712, a group of emigrants from the Rhine Valley in present-day Germany passed through the town on their way to Schoharie. They were the first to record and name the Helderberg Escarpment, originally Hellebergh meaning "bright or clear mountain". This name would also be used for all the land between the Normans Kill and the escarpment. In 1734, the first known religious service was held by a Lutheran dominie from Athens, New York to the "Normanskill Folk", and the first religious structure was a Dutch Reformed Church in 1750.

Guilderland was, from its beginning, a location amenable to early industry due to its many streams for waterwheels, large forests for wood fuel, and the fine sand for glass works. In 1795, Jan and Leonard de Neufville (father and son) established a large glass factory mostly for the manufacture of windows but also for bottles of various shapes, sizes, and uses. Around this factory would spring up the hamlet of Hamilton (today called Guilderland). The factory could not compete with cheap British imports after the War of 1812, and with its collapse, the glass industry would never return to Guilderland. A hat factory and a foundry would both occupy the site over the next 200 years. French's Mills, another hamlet founded on industry, was home to many textile mills, due to the power harnessed from the falls on the Normans Kill near Guilderland Center.

During the US Revolutionary War, many families in Guilderland were split in their loyalties. In New York, tenant farmers generally opposed their landlords, the Patroons, who sided with the rebellious independentists (Patriots), making New York one of the colonies where the war of Independence became a vicious civil war. The patroon of Rensselaerswyck and the local clergy, however, rallied the support of most of the local settlers in opposing the Loyalists. Those who remained loyal to the established government operated, among other places, from the caves of the Helderbergs, raiding settlements with the help of Native Americans. A battle between Loyalists and rebel Schenectady Militia with help from Rhode Island Continental Troops was fought just east of Guilderland Center. It was later alleged the local Loyalists were about to burn Schenectady and Albany, which is not entirely trustworthy as these would have been their own neighbors. In any case, the victory of the American forces allowed the Rhode Island contingent to travel to Saratoga for the Battle of Saratoga that occurred five weeks later, the turning point of the US Revolution.

From 1799 until its formation in 1803, Guilderland was a part of the town of Watervliet. The name Guilderland (spelled Guilderlandt in the original law) was the suggestion of resident Jeremiah Van Rensselaer, who happened to be Lieutenant-Governor of the state at the time, and as such was President of the Senate. His family (that of the original patroon) and many of the original settlers came from Gelderland, a province of the Netherlands. In 1871 the northwestern part of Albany, west from Magazine Street, was annexed to Guilderland, after the town of Watervliet refused the annexation of the same territory. Parts of this territory would be annexed back to Albany in 1910, setting up more or less the current border.

At the start of the town's founding, the Schoolcraft family was prominent. Congressman John L. Schoolcraft was born in Guilderland in September 1806. When his father, Captain John Schoolcraft, died in December of the same year, he was raised by his grandfather, John Schoolcraft. Wealthy grandfather Schoolcraft, who owned much property in Guilderland hamlet and ran an inn and tavern, was the first Justice of the Peace in the hamlet, an elder and trustee of the Hamilton Union Church, and a member of the first Guilderland School Board. He was also the uncle of the famed Henry Rowe Schoolcraft. John L. Schoolcraft started a profitable mercantile business, became president of Albany Commercial Bank (later part of today's Key Bank), and was groomed for politics by Thurlow Weed, editor of the Albany Evening Journal, winning his first Congressional election in 1848.

In the 1840s, Schoolcraft built the early Gothic Schoolcraft mansion John Schoolcraft House upon his return from a European journey. He used it mostly as a summer residence. Schoolcraft was a close friend and confidant of Governor William Seward and married Seward's niece, Carolyn Canfield, in 1853.

== Historic sites ==
There are 37 entries on the U.S. National Register of Historic Places located in Guilderland.

- Albany Glassworks Site
- Altamont Historic District
- Apple Tavern
- Aumic House
- Chapel House
- Coppola House
- Dipietro House DNC HQ
- Frederick Crouse House
- Jacob Crouse Inn
- John and Henry Crouse Farm Complex
- Freeman House
- Fuller's Tavern
- Gardner House
- Gifford Grange Hall
- Gillespie House
- Guilderland Cemetery Vault
- Hamilton Union Church Rectory
- Hamilton Union Presbyterian Church
- Helderberg Reformed Dutch Church
- Adam Hilton House
- Houck Farmhouse
- Knower House
- McNiven Farm Complex
- Mynderse-Frederick House
- Norman Vale
- Stephen Pangburn House
- Charles Parker House
- Prospect Hill Cemetery Building
- Rose Hill
- John Schoolcraft House
- Schoolhouse No. 6
- Sharp Brothers House
- Sharp Farmhouse
- St. Mark's Lutheran Church
- Van Patten Barn Complex
- Vanderpool Farm Complex
- Veeder Farmhouse No. 1
- Veeder Farmhouse No. 2

Guilderland was home to the New York Power Pool and its control center after the Power Pool's formation in 1966 in response to the 1965 blackout. Most of its operations were transferred over to the NYISO after the NYISO's formation in 1999. The NYISO built a new control center in 2014 in Rensselaer, New York.

== Geography ==
According to the United States Census Bureau, the town has a total area of 58.7 square miles (152 km^{2}), of which 57.9 square miles (150 km^{2}) is land and 0.8 square miles (2.1 km^{2}) (1.31%) is water.

The town borders Schenectady County, New York, including the towns of Princetown and Rotterdam on the northern and western edges. It also borders the towns of Berne, Colonie, Bethlehem, and New Scotland and the city of Albany.

There are several ZIP codes in Guilderland, including 12084 (Guilderland), 12085 (Guilderland Center), 12203 (Albany), 12009 (Altamont), 12303 and 12306 (Schenectady), 12159 (Slingerlands), and 12186 (Voorheesville).

Two interstate highways, I-87 and I-90 run through Guilderland, meeting in the city of Albany, north of Crossgates Mall a large mall on the edge of Guilderland. US 20 also runs through the town.

== Demographics ==
Historical population
Census	Pop.	Note	%±
1810	2,476		—
1820	2,270		−8.3%
1830	2,742		20.8%
1840	2,790		1.8%
1850	3,279		17.5%
1860	3,246		−1.0%
1870	3,132		−3.5%
1880	3,459		10.4%
1890	3,606		4.2%
1900	3,530		−2.1%
1910	3,333		−5.6%
1920	3,117		−6.5%
1930	4,394		41.0%
1940	5,522		25.7%
1950	7,284		31.9%
1960	16,710		129.4%
1970	21,208		26.9%
1980	26,515		25.0%
1990	28,764		8.5%
2000	34,045		18.4%
2010	35,303		3.7%
2020	36,848		4.4%
U.S. Decennial Census

As of the 2010 census, there were 35,303 people and 14,205 households residing in the town. The racial makeup of the town was 86.21% White, 3.41% African American, 0.14% Native American, 7.49% Asian, 0.04% Pacific Islander, 0.01% American Indian and Alaska Native, 0.93% from other races, and 1.76% from two or more races. Hispanic or Latino of any race were 3.2% of the population.

There were 13,422 households, out of which 31.6% had children under the age of 18 living with them, 54.2% were married couples living together, 8.5% had a female householder with no husband present and 34.7% were non-families. 28.5% of all households were made up of individuals, and 8.6% had someone living alone who was 65 years of age or older. The average household size was 2.40 and the average family size was 3.00.

In the town, the population was spread out, with 24.1% under the age of 18, 6.0% from 18 to 24, 30.9% from 25 to 44, 25.9% from 45 to 64, and 13.2% who were 65 years of age or older. The median age was 39 years. For every 100 females, there were 92.4 males. For every 100 females age 18 and over, there were 89.4 males.

The median income for a household in the town was $58,669 and the median income for a family was $68,472. Males had a median income of $48,742 versus $34,796 for females. The per capita income for the town was $29,508. About 2.4% of families and 4.1% of the population were below the poverty line, including 2.8% of those under age 18 and 4.0% of those age 65 or over. 64.9% of workers are employed in the private-sector, and 29.1% are government employees.

== Education ==
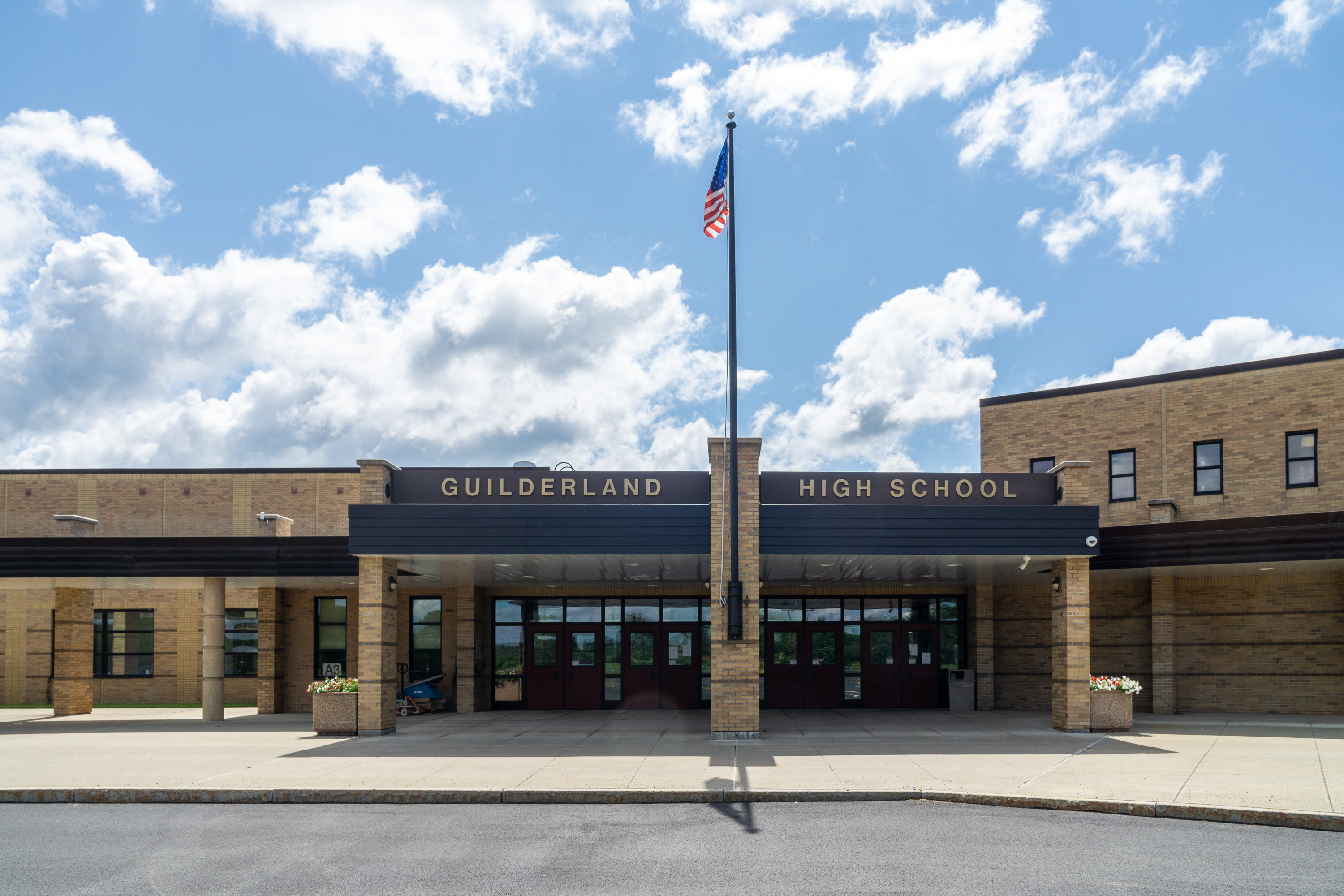
Guilderland High School

In 1812 the town was divided into eight school districts, mostly rural one room school houses. In 1901 the first high school in the town would be established at Altamont, this would be the only high school between Albany and Schoharie at the time. In 1953 the Guilderland Central School District would be formed on the consolidation of the eight smaller districts.

Most of Guilderland Town is within the Guilderland Central School District. It has one high school, Guilderland High School, one middle school, Farnsworth Middle School, and five elementary schools. These include Guilderland Elementary School, Pine Bush Elementary School, Lynnwood Elementary School, Altamont Elementary School, and Westmere Elementary School.

Some portions of the town are served by other school districts, including Voorheesville Central School District, based in the town of New Scotland; as well as Schalmont Central School District and Mohonasen Central School District, both of which are based in the town of Rotterdam.

University of Albany has portions of its property in Guilderland.

== Politics ==
The current town supervisor is Peter G. Barber (since 2016).

The current councilmen and councilwomen are Amanda Beedle, Jake Crawford, Gustavo Santos, and Kevin McDonald.

Lynne M. Buchanan is the current town clerk and Receiver of Taxes.

The current town attorney is James Melita.

The seat of Guilderland's government is the

The Town of Guilderland website is www.townofguilderland.org.

Like most of Albany County, Guilderland generally votes for Democrats for state and federal offices. Barack Obama received 60 percent of the vote in Guilderland in 2008, and 59 percent in 2012. Senators Schumer and Gillibrand and Representative Tonko all easily won Guilderland in their most recent elections.

In June 2018, Richard Sherwood, a former town judge, pleaded guilty to federal money laundering and tax evasion charges as well as a state grand larceny charge. Sherwood stole $11 million from estate trust funds he was charged with managing in his private practice. He also transferred property to his own name. He faces 3.5 years to 10 years in prison.

== Public safety ==
=== Emergency Medical Services ===
Emergency Medical Services in the Town of Guilderland are provided by the Town of Guilderland EMS, a municipal agency delivering Advanced Life Support (ALS) care through career paramedics and EMT's. The service operates independently as a department of the town, having formerly been a division of the Guilderland Police Department.

Guilderland EMS provides ALS-level emergency medical services to the Town of Guilderland, including the Village of Altamont, portions of the University at Albany campus, and The Town of Knox. The department is staffed by approximately 45 EMT's and Paramedics and operates a fleet of seven ALS equipped ambulances and six ALS equipped flycars.

Historically, EMS services in the Town of Guilderland were provided by volunteer rescue squads. The Western Turnpike Rescue Squad served the community from 1939 until 2018, when Guilderland EMS assumed primary ambulance operations. The Altamont Rescue Squad served the Village of Altamont from 1937 until 2023. Today, Guilderland EMS handles all emergency medical care in the town.

=== Fire departments ===
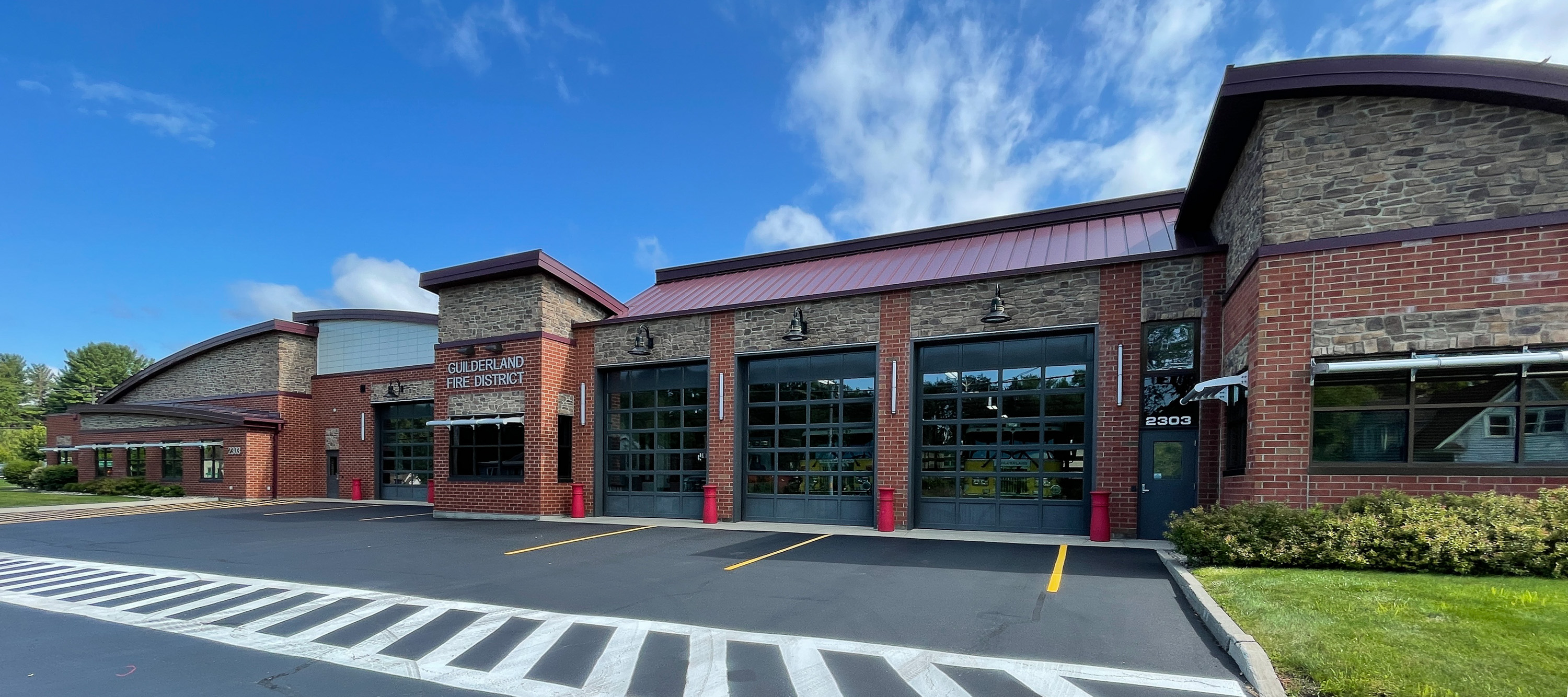
Guilderland fire station on Western Avenue

There are eight main fire departments that also provide rescue; including Guilderland Fire Department, Westmere Fire Department Guilderland Center Fire Department, Fort Hunter Fire Department, Altamont Fire Department, North Bethlehem Fire Department, McKownville Fire Department and Pine Grove Fire Department.

=== Police department ===
The Guilderland Police Department is staffed by 36 sworn members along with 10 telecommunicators, three administrative office staff members and three animal services members. The police department is organized into the Patrol Division, Criminal Investigations Unit, Traffic Safety Unit, Community Services Unit, K-9 Unit, Communications Division, and Animal Control Unit. The Guilderland Police Department is headquartered in Guilderland Town Hall, with a sub-station located at Crossgates Mall.

== Communities ==
- Altamont – A village in the western part of Guilderland, west of Guilderland Center
- Dunnsville – A hamlet in the northwestern part of the town
- Fort Hunter – A hamlet in the northern part of the town
- Fullers – A hamlet northwest of Hartmans Corners on Route 20
- Guilderland – A hamlet with the same name as the town; located on Route 20, established in 1796
- Guilderland Center – A hamlet west of Guilderland hamlet
- Hartmans Corners – A hamlet northwest of Guilderland hamlet on Route 20
- McCormacks Corners – A location northwest of Guilderland hamlet on Route 20
- McKownville – A hamlet near the eastern town line and Albany
- Meadowdale – A hamlet by the southern town line
- Parkers Corners – A hamlet in the northwestern part of the town
- Watervliet Reservoir – A reservoir north of Guilderland Center
- Westmere – A hamlet in the eastern part of the town on Route 20 and a suburb of Albany; a census-designated place (CDP) of the same name is designated over this area.

== Library ==
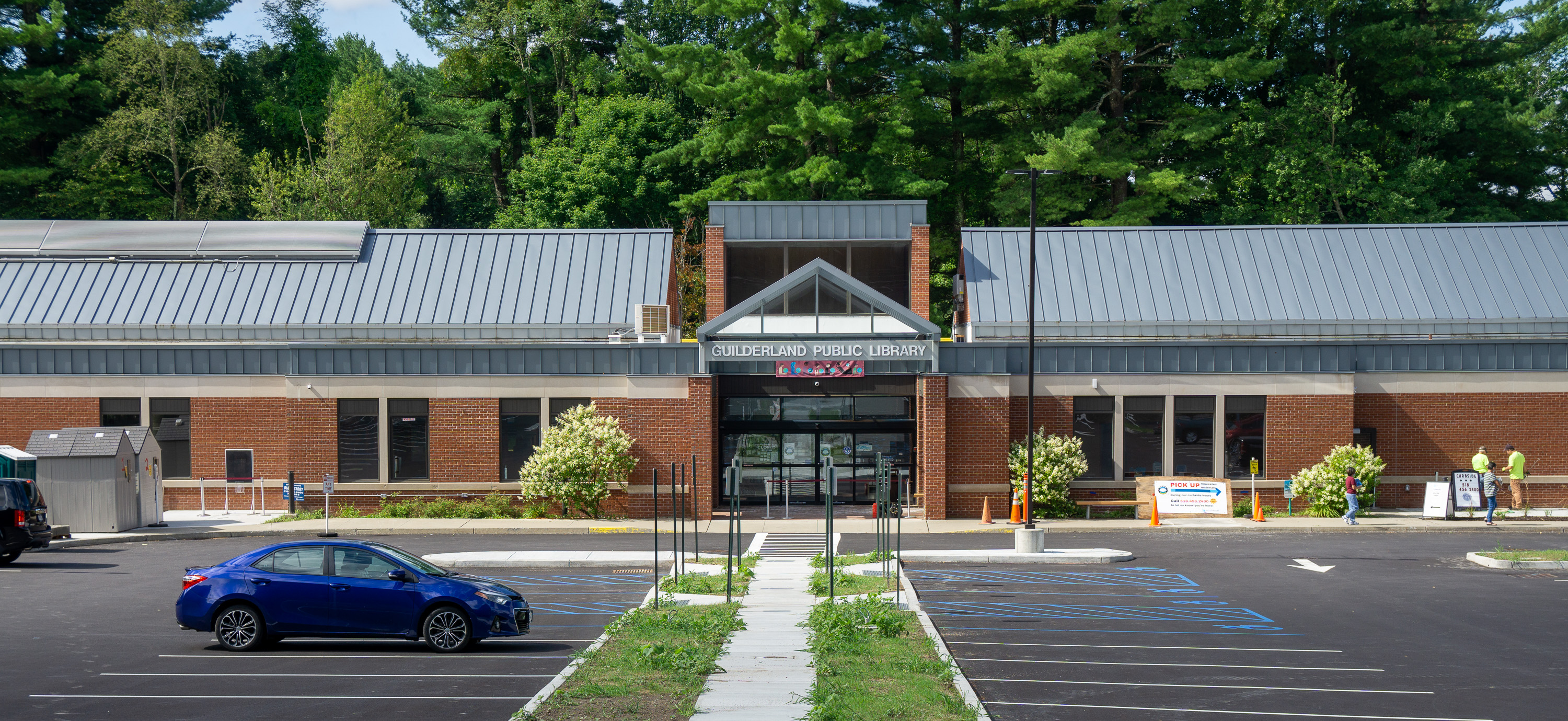
Guilderland Public Library, on Western Avenue

There are actually two libraries located in the Town of Guilderland: The Guilderland Public Library, and the Altamont Free Library. Both are members of the Upper Hudson Library System. The Guilderland Public Library, located at 2228 Western Avenue (US Route 20) serves as a cultural center for the town and the surrounding area. Some 59% of town residents hold library cards. Library use has grown with the population of the town. Since 1992, when the Guilderland Public Library moved into its current location, patron visits have almost doubled, from 177,996 to 343,144 annually, and circulation has more than doubled, from 214,446 to 519,426 items every year.

The Altamont Free Library, located in and serving the Village of Altamont, is a free association library. The Village of Altamont is a political entity within the borders of the Town of Guilderland.

== Sports ==
- Victoria Speedway (aka Victoria Raceway) was a 1/2-mile (0.80 km) dirt oval racing facility located near the hamlet of Dunnsville. It was originally developed by Charles Russo in 1953 for harness racing. When Russo was unable to obtain a pari-mutuel license, he leased the facility to Lou D’Amico from 1960 through 1966 who hosted NASCAR sanctioned stock car racing. Multiple Hall of Fame drivers competed regularly at the venue, including two time national sportsman champion Bill Wimble. (Note: Geolocation of Victoria Speedway: 42.7446°N 74.0287°W)
- The Altamont Speedway was a 1/2-mile (0.80 km) dirt oval located at the Altamont Fairgrounds. It was the home track of 1951 Indianapolis 500 champion Lee Wallard, and hosted NASCAR Grand National (now NASCAR Cup Series) events in 1951 and 1955.

== Notable people ==
- Evert Bancker (1665–1734), fur trader and mayor of Albany
- Jon Busch, soccer player
- Ze Frank, artist and public speaker
- Johnny Grabowski (1900–1946), baseball player and umpire
- Victoria A. Graffeo, judge
- Magdalene Isadora La Grange (1864–1935), poet
- David Paterson, while his primary residence is located downstate in Harlem, the former Governor of New York maintained a residence in Guilderland as a state senator and later Lieutenant Governor of New York prior to assuming the governorship. Paterson resided in the New York State Executive Mansion while in Albany, but kept his Guilderland and Harlem residences.
- Joseph E. Persico, author and speechwriter
- Henry Ramsay (1808–1886), prominent civil engineer
- Henry Schoolcraft (1793–1864), geologist, geographer, and ethnologist
- John L. Schoolcraft (1806 –1860), U.S. Representative from New York, born in Guilderland
- William D. Veeder (1835–1910), politician
- The Chen family, a Chinese immigrant family of four killed in their Westmere house in 2014; the case remains open.
