= Veeder Farmhouse No. 1 =

Historic house in New York, United States

- Veeder Farmhouse #1
- U.S. National Register of Historic Places
- Location within New York Location within the United States
- Location: 3770 Western Tpk., Guilderland, New York
- Coordinates: 42°44′32″N 74°1′29″W
- Area: 1.4 acres (0.57 ha)
- Built: 1830
- Architectural style: Greek Revival
- MPS: Guilderland MRA
- NRHP reference No.: 82001087
- Added to NRHP: November 10, 1982

Veeder Farmhouse #1 is a historic home located at Guilderland in Albany County, New York. It was built about 1830 and is a two-story frame building on a cut stone foundation in the Greek Revival style. There is a 1 1/2-story rear ell. It features a recessed center entrance with sidelights and transom. It is a "sister" house to the Veeder Farmhouse No. 2.

It was listed on the National Register of Historic Places in 1982.
