= Vanderpool Farm Complex =

- U.S. National Register of Historic Places
- Location within New York Location within the United States
- Location: 3647 Settles Hill Rd., Guilderland, New York
- Coordinates: 42°43′50″N 74°2′13″W
- Area: 56.3 acres (22.8 ha)
- Built: ca. 1800
- Architectural style: Dutch H-framing
- MPS: Guilderland MRA
- NRHP reference No.: 82001085
- Added to NRHP: November 10, 1982

Vanderpool Farm Complex is a historic home and barn located at Guilderland in Albany County, New York. The house was built about 1855 and has a two-story main block with 1 1/2-story ell. It features a classical, recessed center entrance with side lights and transom. The Dutch barn was built about 1800 and a small shed connects it to the adjacent small English barn.

It was listed on the National Register of Historic Places in 1982.
