= Aumic House =

Historic house in New York, United States

- U.S. National Register of Historic Places
- Location within New York Location within the United States
- Location: Leesome Ln., Guilderland, New York
- Coordinates: 42°41′15″N 74°2′5″W
- Area: 16.4 acres (6.6 ha)
- Built: 1887
- Architectural style: Colonial Revival, Shingle Style
- MPS: Guilderland MRA
- NRHP reference No.: 82001056
- Added to NRHP: November 10, 1982

The Aumic House in Guilderland, New York was built in 1887. It is a massive, composite styled building with hipped roof and gables and dormers. It includes Shingle Style and Colonial Revival elements. The house is built partway up a hill, the Helderberg Escarpment, and has a "commanding view of Altamont and the area east".

It was listed on the National Register of Historic Places in 1982. The listing included two contributing buildings on a 16.4-acre (6.6 ha) area.
