= Mynderse-Frederick House =

Historic house in New York, United States

- U.S. National Register of Historic Places
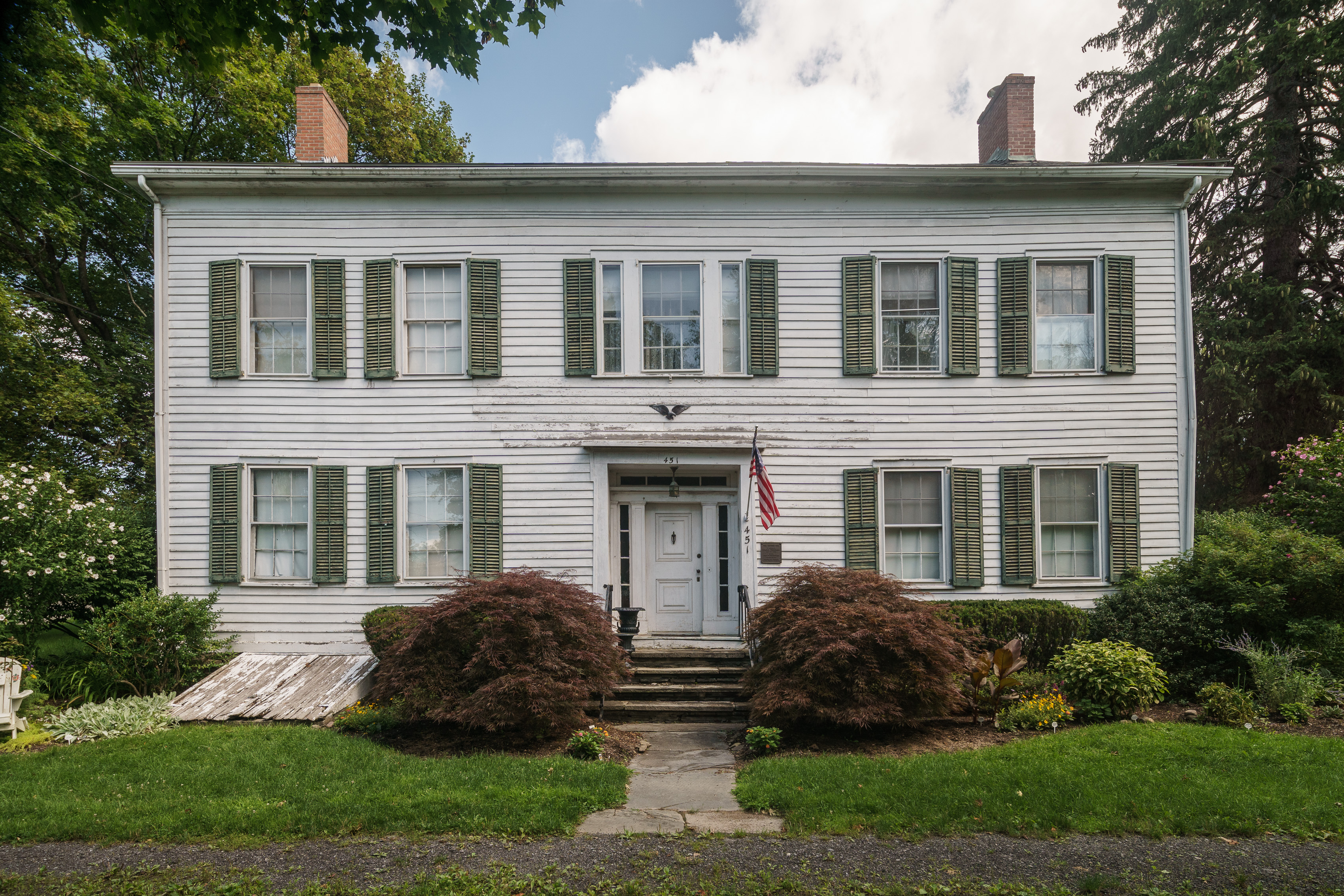

- Location within New York Location within the United States
- Location: 451 Main St., Guilderland, New York
- Coordinates: 42°42′10″N 73°57′55″W
- Area: 1 acre (0.40 ha)
- Built: 1802
- Architectural style: Colonial
- MPS: Guilderland MRA
- NRHP reference No.: 82001075
- Added to NRHP: November 10, 1982

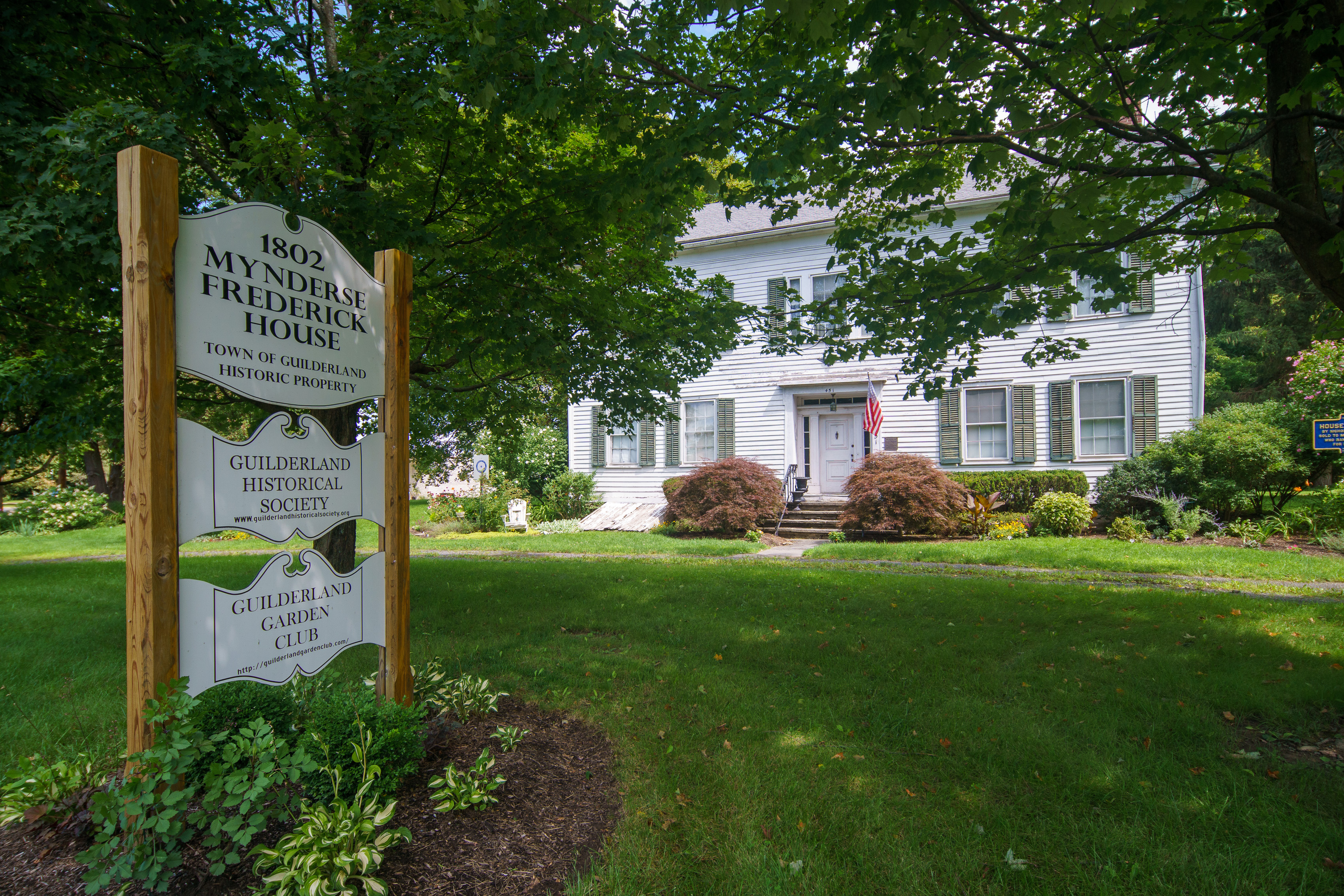
The house is used by the local historical society and garden club

Mynderse-Frederick House is a historic home and tavern located at Guilderland in Albany County, New York. It was built in 1802 and is a two-story frame house with rear ell in the Colonial style. It has a gable roof and features a recessed entrance with pilasters, transom and sidelights. It was adapted for use as a tavern in the 1840s and is now used as a local history museum.

It was listed on the National Register of Historic Places in 1982.

== See also ==
- National Register of Historic Places listings in Albany County, New York
