= St. Mark's Lutheran Church (Guilderland, New York) =

Historic church in New York, United States

- U.S. National Register of Historic Places
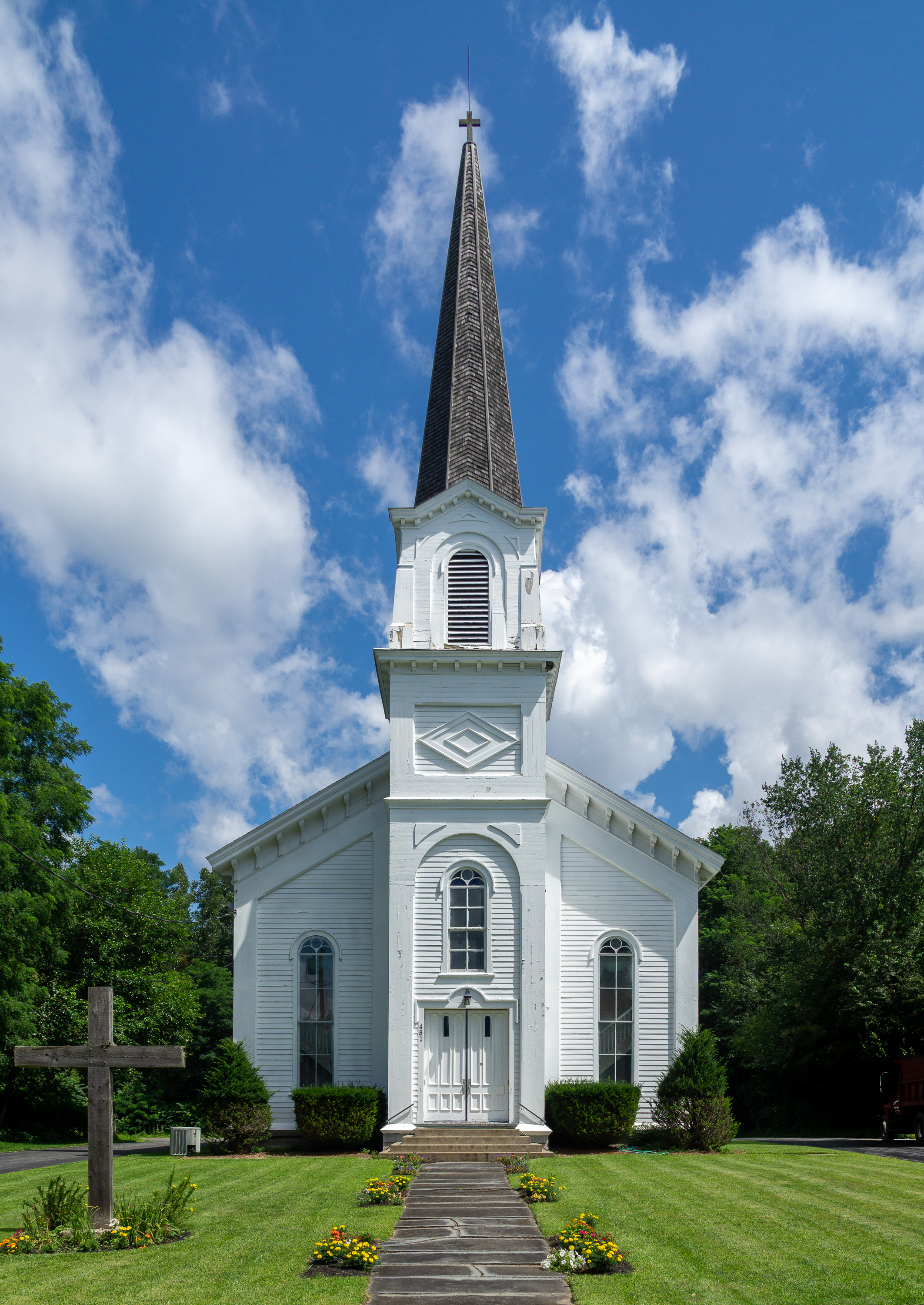

- Location within New York Location within the United States
- Location: Main St., Guilderland, New York
- Coordinates: 42°42′16″N 73°58′10″W
- Area: 2 acres (0.81 ha)
- Built: 1872
- Architectural style: Italianate
- MPS: Guilderland MRA
- NRHP reference No.: 82001080
- Added to NRHP: November 10, 1982

St. Mark's Lutheran Church is a historic Lutheran church on Main Street in Guilderland Center, Albany County, New York. It was built in 1872 in a vernacular Italianate style. It has curved arched windows and a bracketed cornice. It features a square bell tower with pedimented cornice and steeple. St. Mark's served the Lutherans until 1973, when the town leased it as a community center.

It was listed on the National Register of Historic Places in 1982.

== See also ==
- National Register of Historic Places listings in Albany County, New York
