= Guilderland Cemetery Vault =

Historic cemetery in New York, United States

- U.S. National Register of Historic Places
- Location within New York Location within the United States
- Location: In Guilderland Cemetery, NY 158, Guilderland, New York
- Coordinates: 42°42′45″N 73°59′16″W
- Area: less than one acre
- Built: 1872
- MPS: Guilderland MRA
- NRHP reference No.: 82001067
- Added to NRHP: November 10, 1982

Guilderland Cemetery Vault is a historic burial vault located in Guilderland Cemetery at Guilderland in Albany County, New York. It was built in 1872 and is a small one story cobblestone building. It is built of coursed cobblestones with smooth ashlar quoins and rounded arch door.

It was listed on the National Register of Historic Places in 1982.
