= Gillespie House (Guilderland, New York) =

Historic house in New York, United States

- U.S. National Register of Historic Places
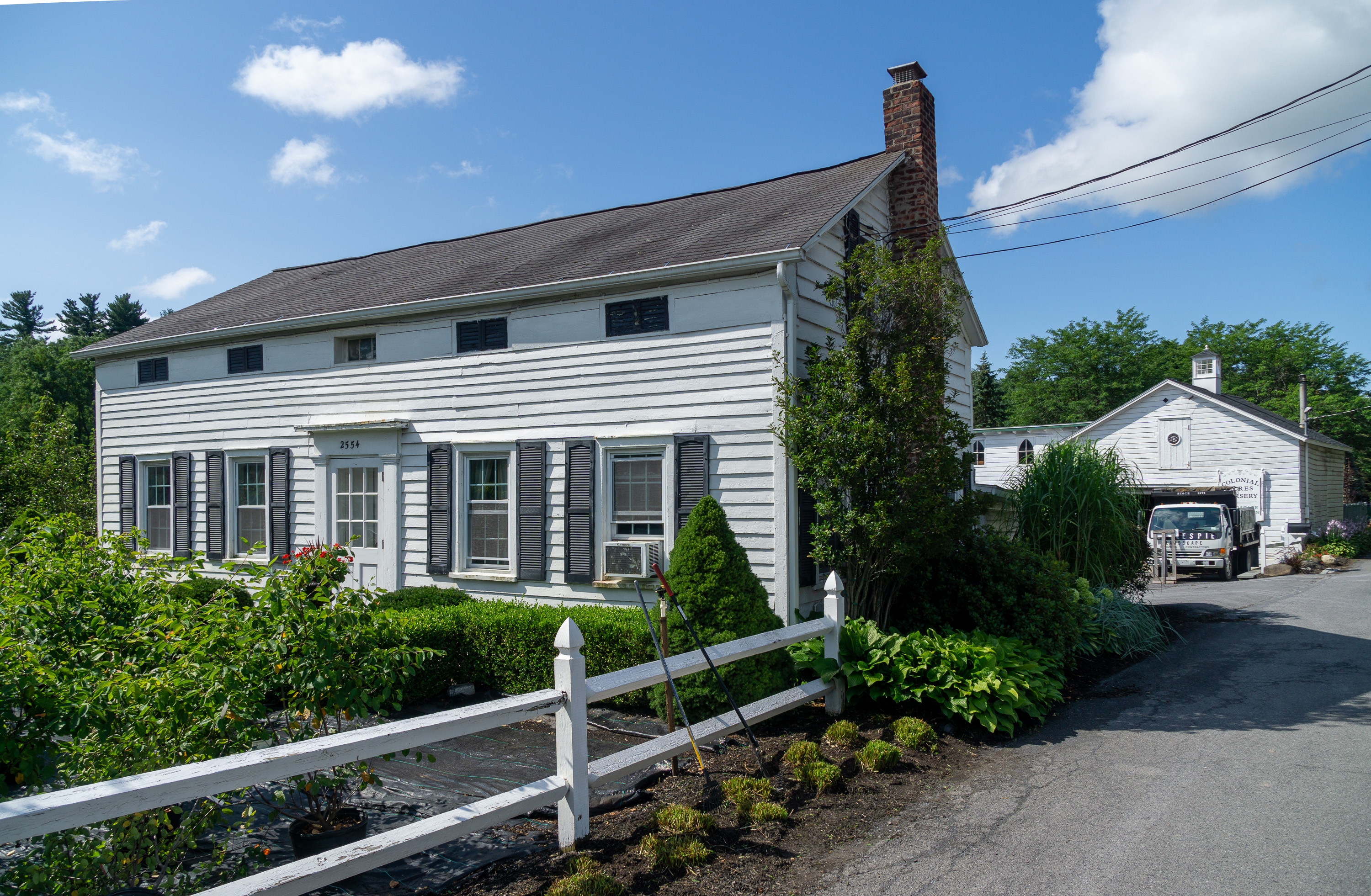

- Location within New York Location within the United States
- Location: 2554 Western Tpk, Guilderland, New York
- Coordinates: 42°42′45″N 73°55′48″W
- Area: 1.3 acres (0.53 ha)
- Built: 1840
- Architectural style: Greek Revival
- MPS: Guilderland MRA
- NRHP reference No.: 82001066
- Added to NRHP: November 10, 1982

Gillespie House is a historic home located at Guilderland in Albany County, New York. It was built about 1840 and is a small, 1 1/2-story Greek Revival–style farmhouse with a center entrance and small rear ell. It features five small eyebrow windows in the eave. Also on the property is a garage.

It was listed on the National Register of Historic Places in 1982.
