= Chapel House (Guilderland, New York) =

Historic house in New York, United States

- U.S. National Register of Historic Places
- Location within New York Location within the United States
- Location: Western Ave., Guilderland, New York
- Coordinates: 42°40′55″N 73°49′51″W
- Area: 3.6 acres (1.5 ha)
- Built: 1910
- Architectural style: Bungalow/Craftsman, Arts and Crafts
- MPS: Guilderland MRA
- NRHP reference No.: 82001057
- Added to NRHP: November 10, 1982

The Chapel House is a two-story, Arts and Crafts-style house built in 1910 and located in Guilderland, New York on the southern edge of the Uptown Campus of the University at Albany (SUNY Albany).

It was listed on the National Register of Historic Places in 1982. The listing included one contributing building on a 3.6-acre (1.5 ha) area.
