= Helderberg Reformed Dutch Church =

Historic church in New York, United States

- U.S. National Register of Historic Places
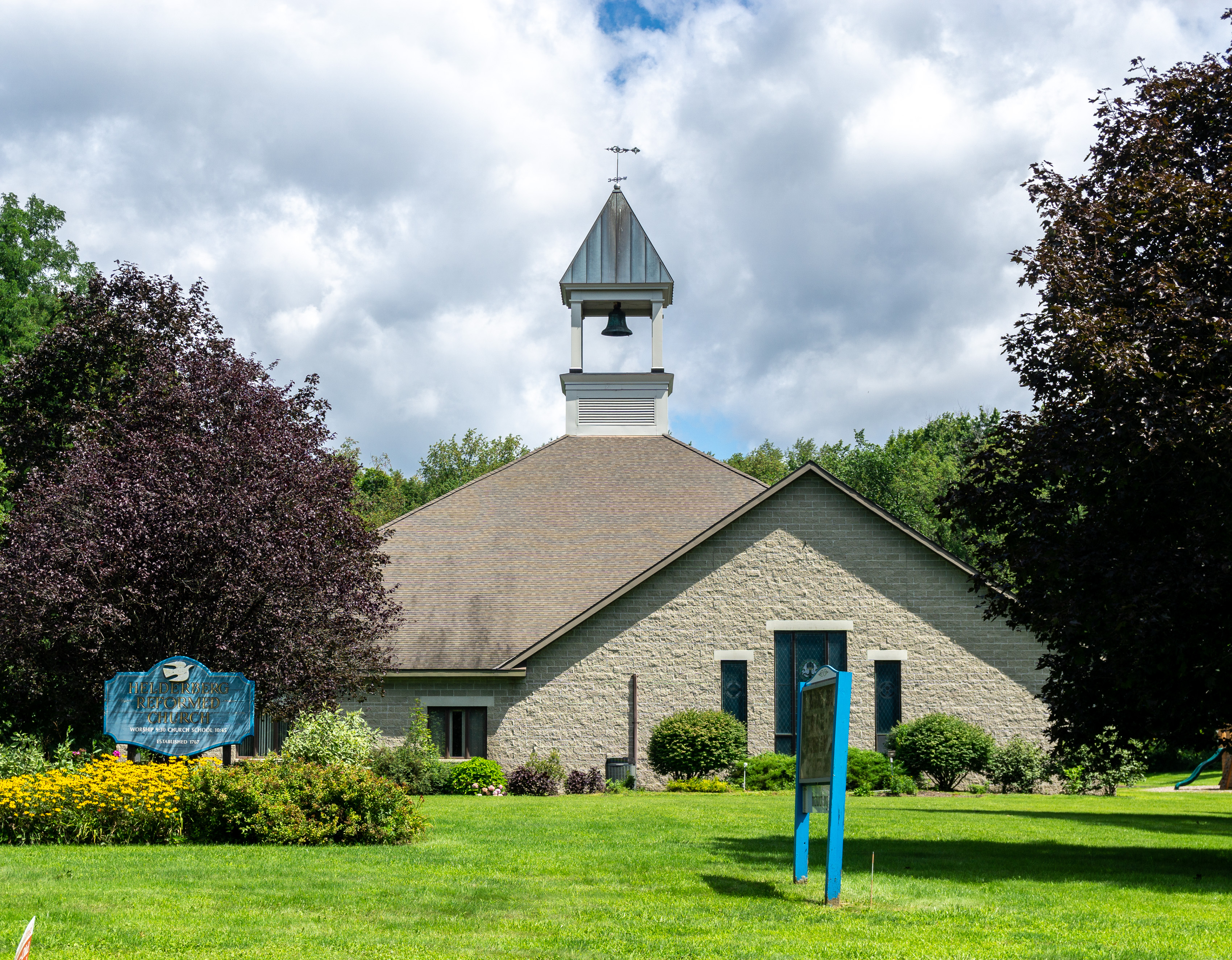
- The 1987 building, photographed 2021

- Location within New York Location within the United States
- Location: 140 Main St., Guilderland, New York
- Coordinates: 42°42′10″N 73°57′52″W
- Area: 2.9 acres (1.2 ha)
- Built: 1895
- Architect: Fuller, Aaron
- Architectural style: Late Gothic Revival
- MPS: Guilderland MRA
- NRHP reference No.: 82001070
- Added to NRHP: November 10, 1982

Helderberg Reformed Dutch Church was a historic Dutch Reformed church at 140 Main Street in Guilderland, Albany County, New York. It was built in 1895 in a vernacular Late Gothic Revival style. The church burned and was demolished in 1986. The Reformed congregation which occupied the church was chartered in 1767. They erected a new church building in Guilderland Center in 1987. The original cornerstone of the historic church was laid into the edifice of this new church building.

Helderberg Reformed Dutch Church was listed on the National Register of Historic Places in 1982.
