= Vanderheyden =

Vanderheyden is a surname. Notable people with the surname include:

- Barbara Vanderhyden, Canadian researcher of ovarian cancer
- Jan van der Heyden (1637–1712), Dutch Baroque-era painter, glass painter, draughtsman and printmaker
- Jan Vanderheyden (1890–1961), Belgian film producer and director
- JCJ Vanderheyden (1928–2012), Dutch painter and photographer
- Kris Vanderheyden or Insider, Belgian techno and electronic music pioneer
- Sandra Vander-Heyden (born 1964), American Olympic field hockey player

== See also ==
- Van der Heijden, a Dutch toponymic surname
- William H. VanderHeyden House, a historic house in Ionia, Michigan
- Vanderheyden, a non-profit organization based in Wynantskill, New York
