= Vermeij =

Vermeij or Vermey is a Dutch toponymic surname. It is a contraction of "van der Meij" and indicates an origin either from the river De Meije or from the town De Meije along it. Notable people with the surname include:

- Geerat J. Vermeij (born 1946), Dutch-born American paleontologist
- Marco Vermey (born 1965), Dutch racing cyclist
- Roos Vermeij (born 1968), Dutch politician
- Vincent Vermeij (born 1994), Dutch football forward

== See also ==
- Vermeyen, Dutch surname of the same origin
- Van der Meijden, Dutch surname of the same origin
- Kim-Lian van der Meij (born 1980), Dutch musical actress
