= Mheer =

- Village
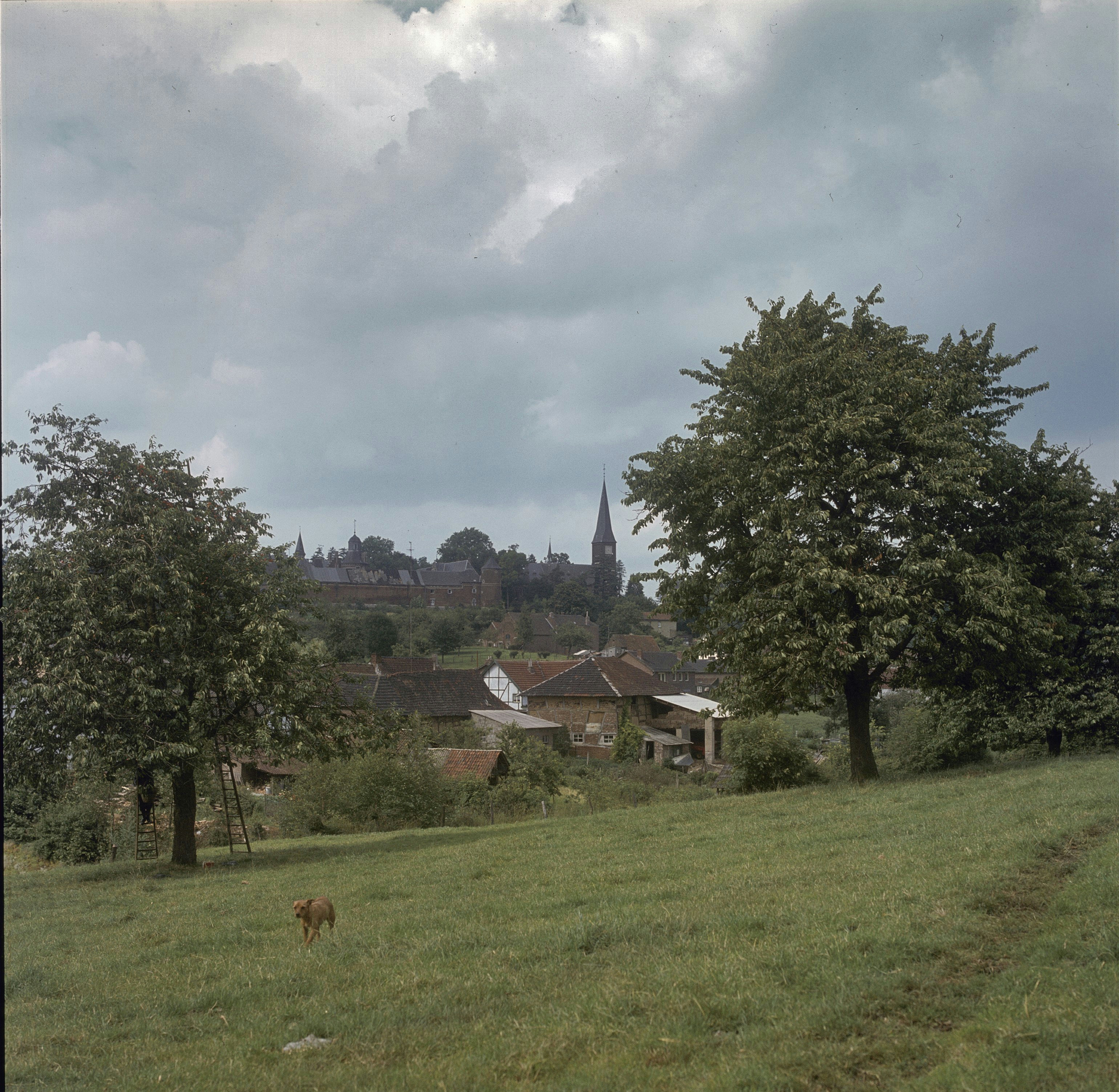
- View on Mheer

- Coat of arms

- Location in the Netherlands Location in the province of Limburg in the Netherlands
- Coordinates: 50°46′58″N 5°47′35″E
- Country: Netherlands
- Province: Limburg
- Municipality: Eijsden-Margraten

Area
  - Total: 4.36 km^{2} (1.68 sq mi)
- Elevation: 170 m (560 ft)

Population (2021)
  - Total: 860
  - Density: 200/km^{2} (510/sq mi)
- Time zone: UTC+1 (CET)
  - Summer (DST): UTC+2 (CEST)
- Postal code: 6261
- Dialing code: 043

Mheer (Dutch pronunciation: [ˈmeːr]; Limburgish: Maer) is a village in the Dutch province of Limburg. It is located in the municipality of Eijsden-Margraten and about 12 km southeast of Maastricht.

== History ==
The village was first mentioned in the 1170s as de Mere, and means lake. Mheer developed in the Middle Ages on the plateau of Margraten. A castle was built on the highest point belong to the Land of Dalhem. The village became a heerlijkheid in 1564.

Meer Castle was first mentioned in 1314. The oldest parts date from the early-14th century. The current complex was finished by 1570. In 1914, an extensive remodelling was planned, but was only partially executed between 1918 and 1923. The park was laid out in 1852.

The Catholic St Lambertus is a single aisled church with needle spire. It was built between 1876 and 1877 according to a design by Pierre Cuypers as a replacement of the 1774 church.

Mheer was home to 405 people in 1840. It was a separate municipality until 1982, when it was merged with Margraten. The municipality also covered Banholt and Terhorst. In 2011, it became part of the municipality of Eijsden-Margraten.

== Gallery ==
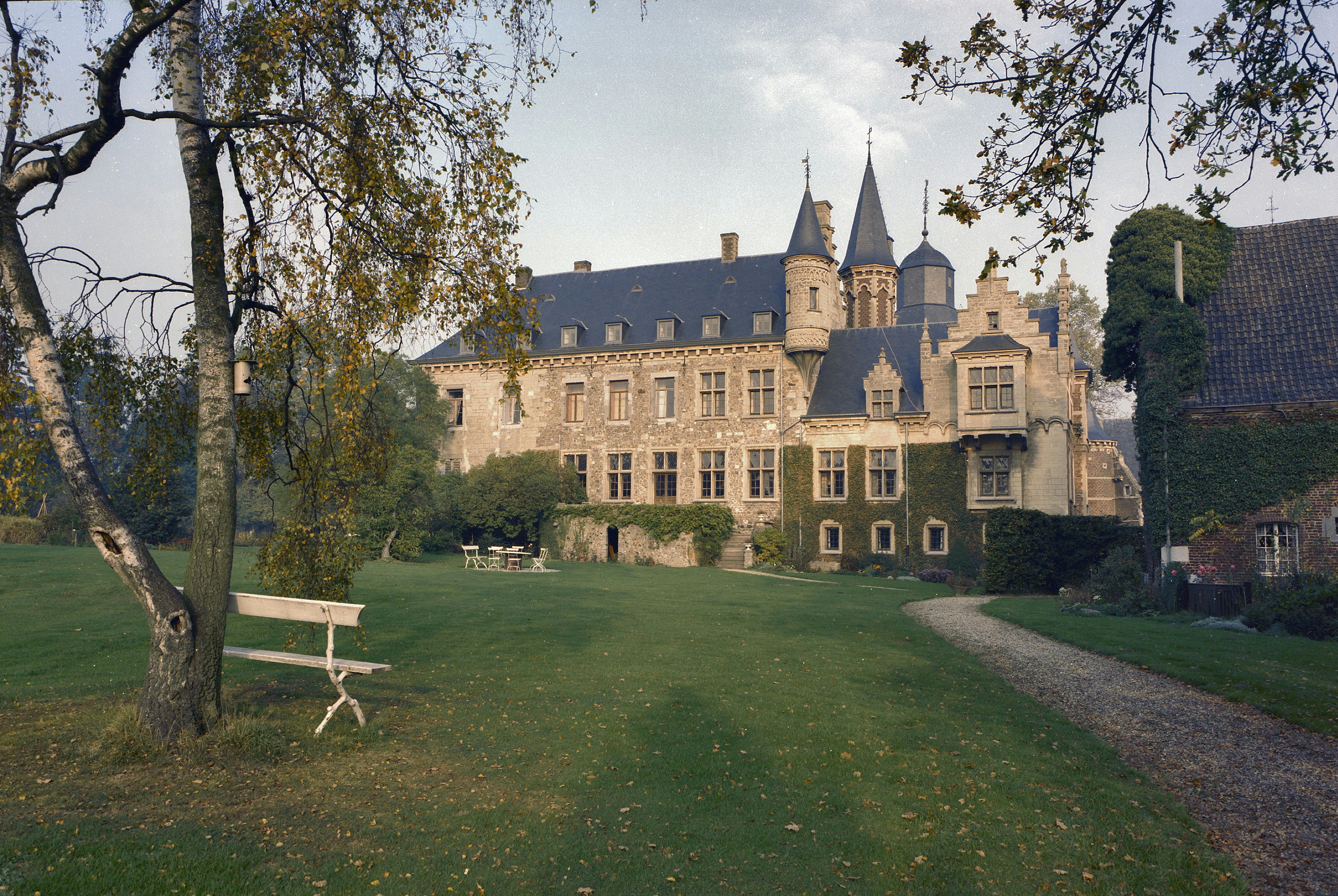
Mheer Castle

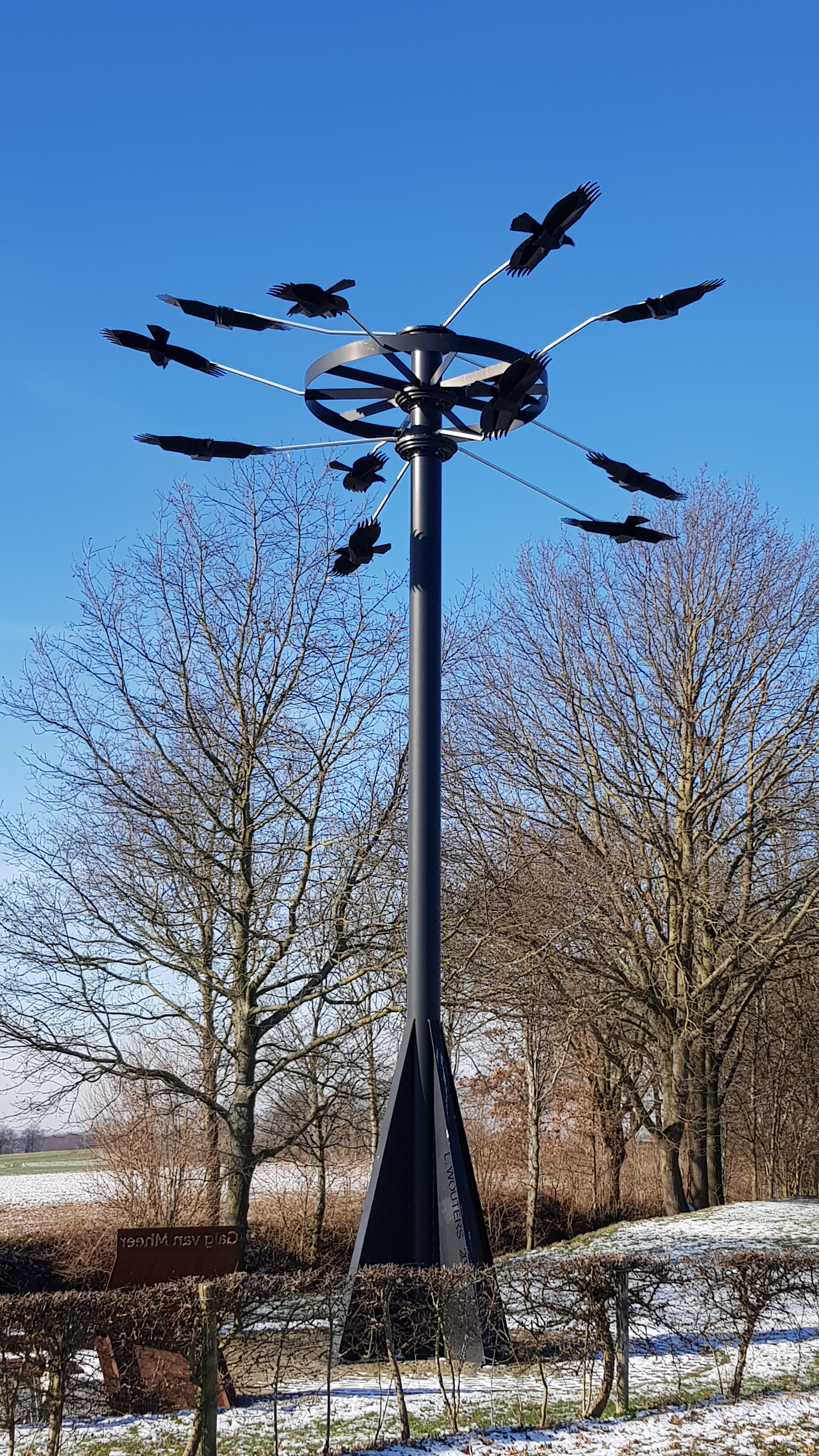
Gallow of Mheer

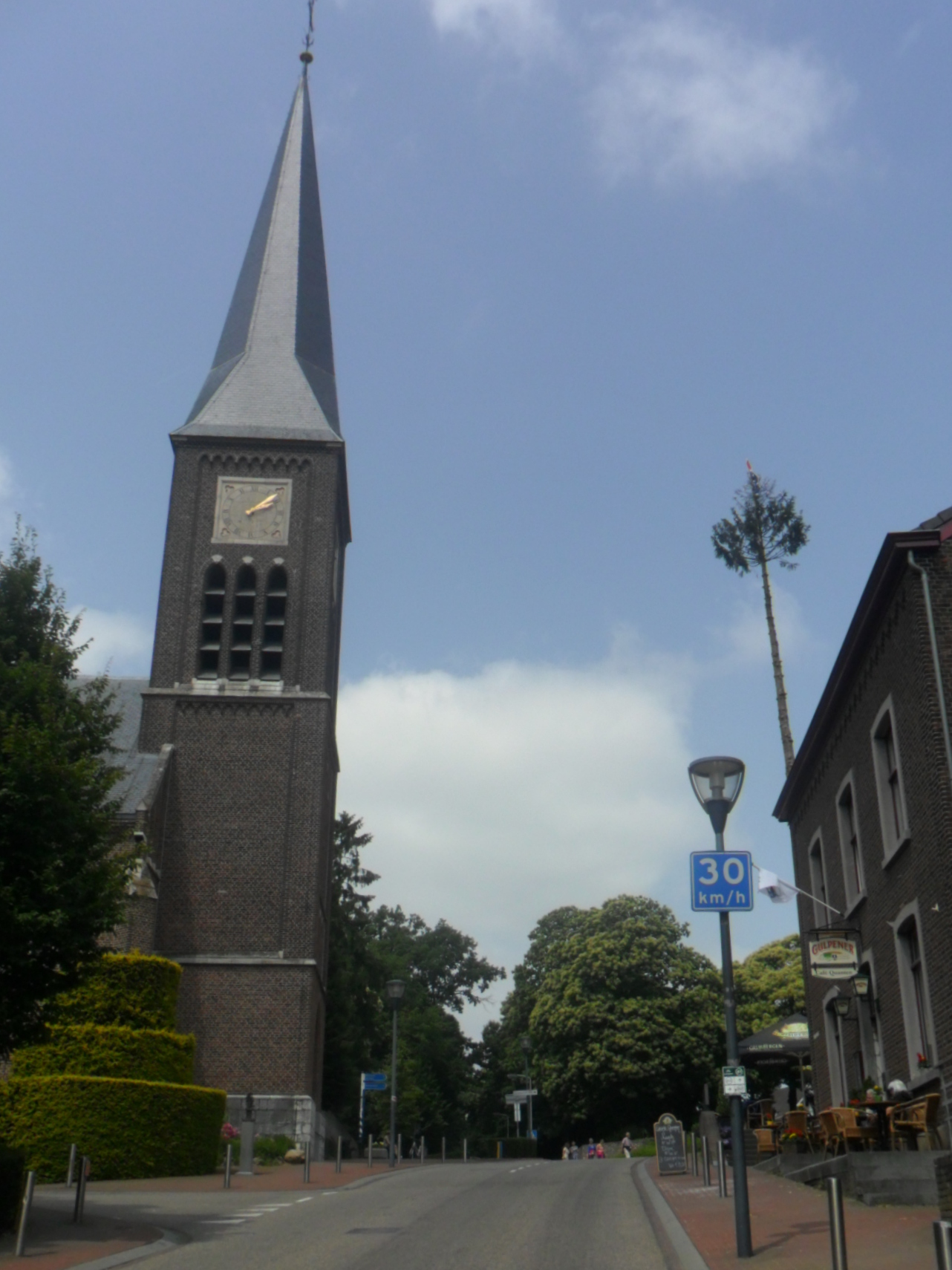
St Lambertus Church and maypole

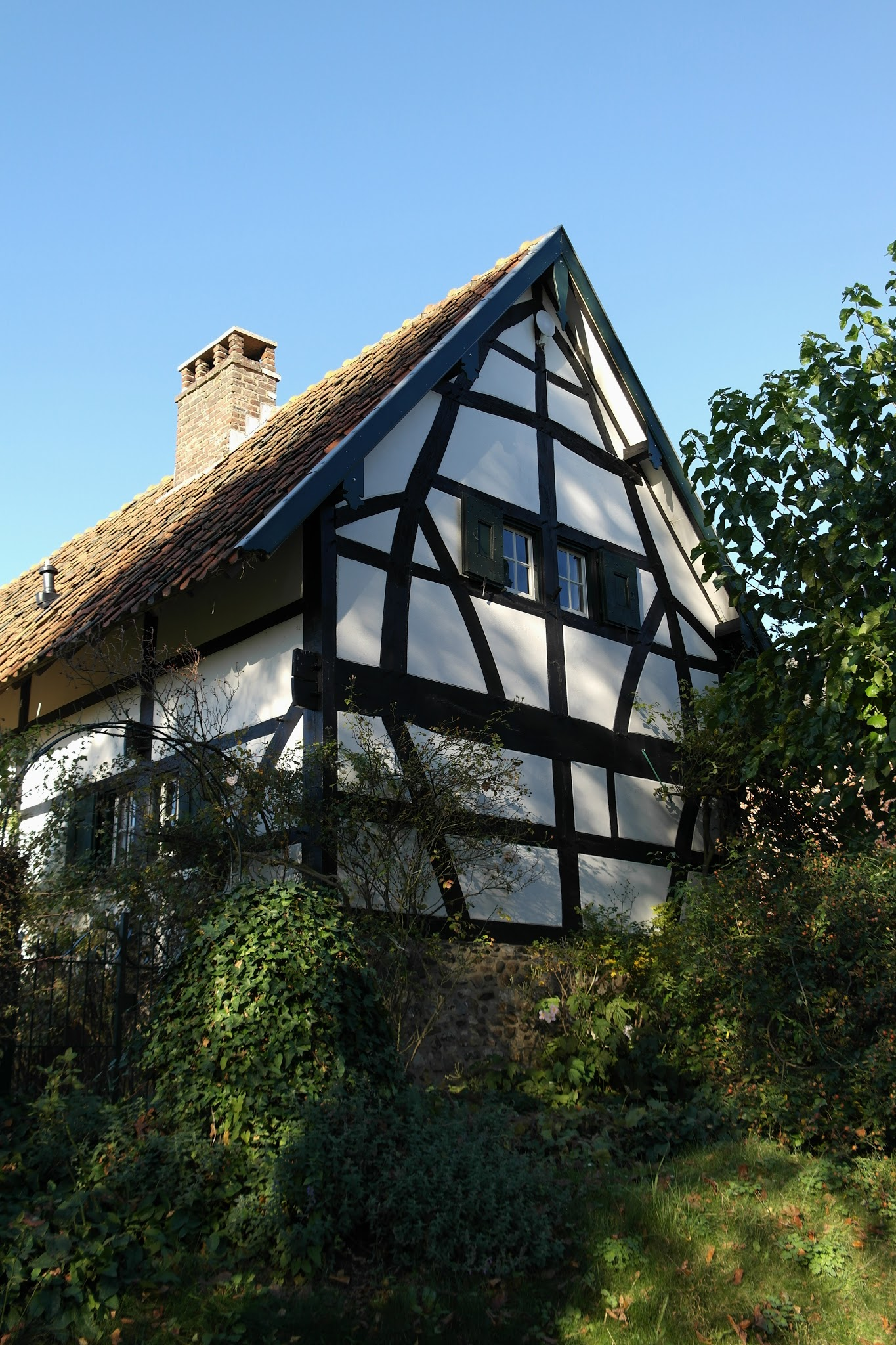
House in mheer
