= Van der Heijden =

Van der Heijden is a Dutch toponymic surname meaning "from the heath" (modern Dutch heide). Variant spellings are Van der Heijde, Van der Heyden, “VanDerHeyden” and concatenated forms. The surnames Van der Heide, Verheijen and Verheyen have the same origin. Notable people with the surname include:

== Van der Heijden ==
- A. F. Th. van der Heijden (born 1951), Dutch writer
- Andrew van der Heijden (born 1984), New Zealand rugby player
- Dennis van der Heijden (born 1997), Dutch footballer
- Frans Jozef van der Heijden (1938–2016), Dutch politician
- Harold van der Heijden (born 1960), Dutch chess composer
- Hein van der Heijden (born 1958), Dutch actor
- Jan-Arie van der Heijden (born 1988), Dutch footballer
- Jorien van der Heijden (born 1985), Dutch esports host
- Karel van der Heijden (1826–1900), Dutch general
- Laura van der Heijden (born 1990), Dutch handball player
- Laura van der Heijden (born 1997), British musician
- Michael van der Heijden (born 1982), Dutch footballer
- Michiel van der Heijden (born 1992), Dutch cyclist
- Milou van der Heijden (born 1990), Dutch squash player
- Patrick van der Heijden (born 1992), Brazilian field hockey player
- Paul F. van der Heijden (born 1949), Dutch legal scholar
- Yuri van der Heijden (born 1990), Brazilian field hockey player

== Vanderheijden ==
- Grietje Vanderheijden (born 1978), Belgian actress

== Van der Heijde ==
- Amber van der Heijde (born 1988), Dutch footballer

== Van der Heyde ==
- Nikolai van der Heyde (1936–2020), Dutch film director and screenwriter

== Van der Heyden ==
- Abraham van der Heyden (1597–1678), Dutch Calvinist minister and controversialist
- Gaspard van der Heyden (1496–1549), Flemish goldsmith, engraver, master printer and builder of precision astronomical instruments
- Jacob van der Heyden (1573–1645), Flemish Baroque painter, sculptor and engraver
- Jan van der Heyden (1637–1712), Dutch painter, draughtsman, printmaker, and inventor
- Jasper Van Der Heyden (born 1995), Belgian footballer
- Jef van der Heyden (1926–2011), Dutch film director and screenwriter
- Jelle van der Heyden (born 1995), Dutch footballer
- Ludo Van der Heyden, Belgian-American management scholar
- Peter Van Der Heyden (born 1976), Belgian professional football player
- Pieter van der Heyden (c.1530–1572), Flemish printmaker
- Stéphane Van Der Heyden (born 1969), Belgian professional football player
- Todd van der Heyden (born 1973), Canadian television reporter and news anchor

== Vanderheyden ==
- Jan Vanderheyden (1890–1961), Belgian comedy film producer and director
- JCJ Vanderheyden (1928–2012), Dutch painter and photographer
- Sandra Vander-Heyden (born 1964), American field hockey player

== See also ==
- Heyden (disambiguation)
- Van der Heide
- Van Derheyden House
- Vanderheyden
