= Verheyen =

Verheyen is a Dutch-language toponymic surname. It is a variant spelling of Verheijen and a contraction of the surname Van der Heijden, meaning "from the heath".

Notable people with this surname include:

- Carl Verheyen (born 1954), American guitarist, known for his work in Supertramp
- David Verheyen (born 1981), Belgian road racing cyclist
- Franz Verheyen (1877–1955), German racing cyclist
- Geert Verheyen (born 1973), Belgian road racing cyclist
- Gert Verheyen (born 1970), Belgian footballer
- Gustave Verheyen (1880–1951), South African cricket umpire
- Jacques Verheyen (1911–1989), Dutch glazier and painter
- Jan Verheyen (born 1944), Belgian footballer
- Jean Verheyen (1896–?), Belgian cyclist
- Jef Verheyen (1932–1984), Belgian painter
- Philip Verheyen (1648–1711), Belgian surgeon
- Piet A. Verheyen (1931–2021), Dutch economist
- René Verheyen (born 1952), Belgian football midfielder
- Robin Verheyen (born 1983), Belgian jazz saxophonist and composer
- Sabine Verheyen (born 1964), German politician and Member of the European Parliament
- Walter Verheyen (1932–2005), Belgian zoologist
