= Verheiden =

Verheiden is a surname. Notable people with the surname include:

- Jacobus Verheiden (fl. 1590–1618), Dutch schoolmaster and writer
- Mark Verheiden (born 1956), American television, movie, and comic book writer

== See also ==
- Verheijen
- Verheyden
