= Meij =

Meij, or similar, may refer to:

== Meij ==
- Don Meij (born 1968), Australian business entrepreneur and CEO
- Harold Meij (born 1963), Dutch businessman

== Meijs ==
- Lucas Meijs (born 1963), Dutch organizational theorist and professor
- Raymond Meijs (born 1968), Dutch former road cyclist

== de Meij ==
- Dave de Meij (born 2001), Dutch footballer
- Johan de Meij (born 1953), Dutch conductor, trombonist, and composer

== van der Meij ==
- Henriëtte van der Meij (1850-1945), Dutch leading figure in the first wave feminist movement in the Netherlands
- Kim-Lian van der Meij (born 1980), Dutch musical actress, presenter and singer-songwriter

== See also ==
- Van der Meijden
- Van der Heijden
- Meiji (disambiguation)
