= Verheyden =

Verheyden is a surname. Notable people with the surname include:

- Isidore Verheyden (1846–1905), Belgian painter
- Mattheus Verheyden (1700–1776), Dutch painter
- Wim Verheyden (born 1967), Belgian-Flemish politician

== See also ==
- Verheiden
- Verheijen
