= Van der Heide =

Van der Heide is a Dutch toponymic surname meaning "from the heath". The surnames Van der Heijden and Verheijen have the same origin. People with this surname include:

- Henning van der Heide (ca. 1460 - 1521), German late Gothic sculptor
- Jan van der Heide (died 1959), Dutch tennis player
- Joop van der Heide (1917–1980), Dutch footballer
- Petra van der Heide (born 1971), Dutch harpist
- Rogier van der Heide (born 1970), Dutch lighting designer
- Sandor van der Heide (born 1978), Dutch footballer
- Willy van der Heide, pseudonym of Willem van den Hout (1915–1985), Dutch children's writer

Van der Heiden

- Abraham van der Heiden (1597–1678), Dutch Calvinist minister and controversialist
- Jan van der Heiden (1637–1712), Dutch painter, draughtsman, printmaker, and inventor
- Mischa van der Heiden (born 1971), Dutch DJ

Van Heiden

- Frederick Maurice van Heiden (1821–1900), Russian governor of Finland, son of Lodewijk
- Lodewijk van Heiden (1772–1850), Dutch admiral and Imperial Russian Navy admiral

== See also ==
- Van der Heijden
- Heiden (surname)
