= Mingzhi =

Mingzhi is the Pinyin romanisation of various Chinese given names (e.g. 明志, 明治, 明智). These names may also be spelled Ming-chih in the Wade–Giles romanisation which is widespread in Taiwan, or spelled some other way based on romanisations from other varieties of Chinese. Mingzhi is also an era name in Chinese history.

== Names of people ==
- Song Maojin, style name Mingzhi (明之), Ming Dynasty landscape painter
- Peng Mingzhi (彭明治; 1905–1993), Chinese general and diplomat
- Chua Mia Tee (蔡明智; born 1931), Chinese-born Singaporean painter
- Chen Ming-chi (sprinter) (陳明智; born 1947), Taiwanese sprinter
- Namewee (born Wee Meng Chee 黃明志, 1983), Malaysian hip hop artist

== Chinese era name ==
Mingzhi, era name of Zhaoming Emperor of Dali Kingdom, Duan Suying.

== See also ==
- Meiji (disambiguation), romanization of Japanese 明治
