= Terhorst =

- Hamlet
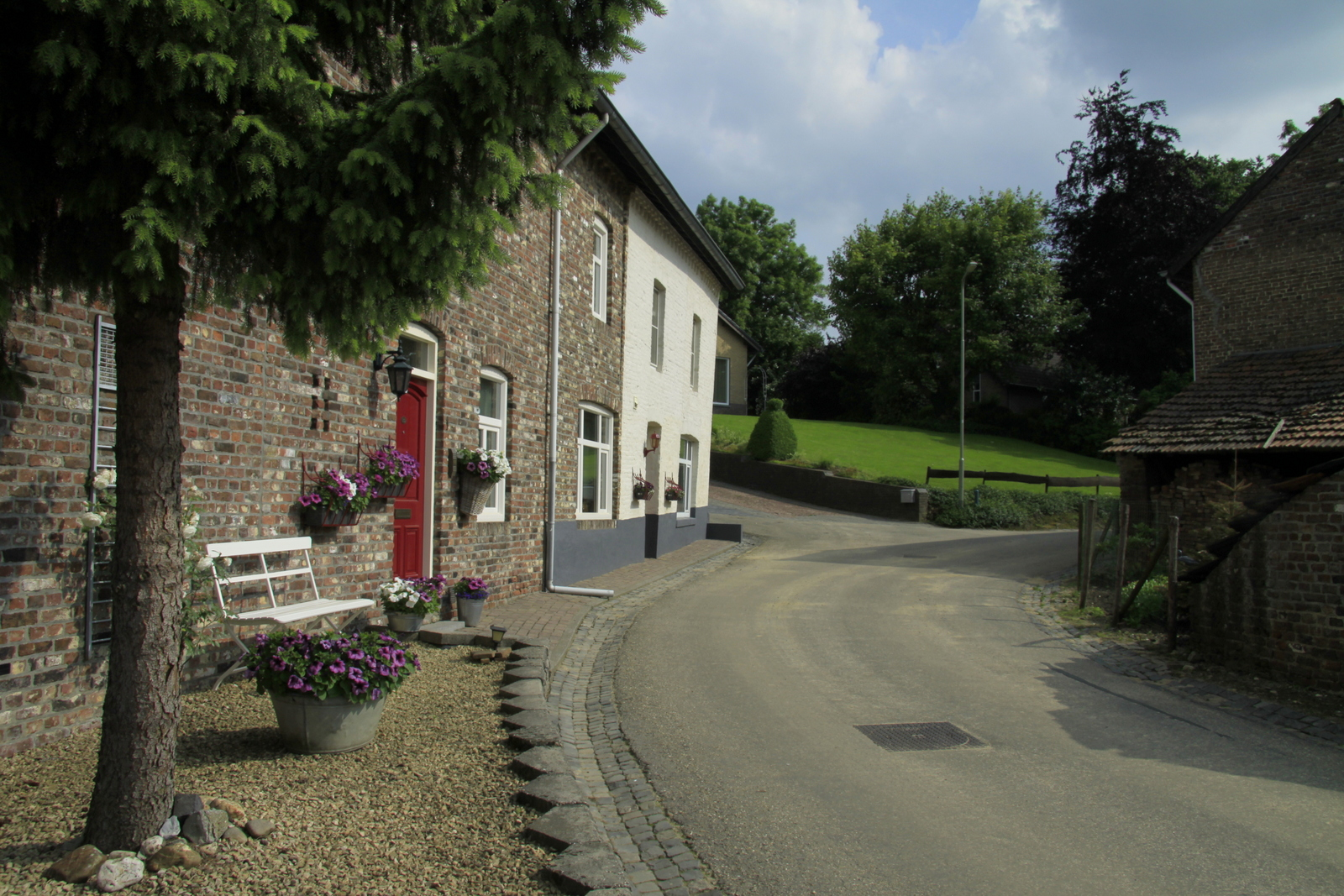
- Streets of Terhorst

- Location in the Netherlands Location in the province of Limburg in the Netherlands
- Coordinates: 50.78711°N 5.81608°E
- Country: Netherlands
- Province: Limburg
- Municipality: Eijsden-Margraten
- Time zone: UTC+1 (CET)
  - Summer (DST): UTC+2 (CEST)
- Postal code: 6262
- Dialing code: 043

Terhorst (in Limburgs dialect: Terhoorsj) is a little hamlet of 33 houses and part of the village of Banholt (in Limburgs dialect: Tebannet), which is in the municipality of Eijsden-Margraten in the province of Limburg, Netherlands. In the middle of the village, Terhorst has its own little chapel built in 1949 and every year in August there is the traditional annual Chapel party (kapelfeest).

Terhorst is not a statistical entity, and the postal authorities have placed it under Banholt. It was first mentioned between 1803 and 1820 as Terhorst, and means "height with growth".

== Gallery ==
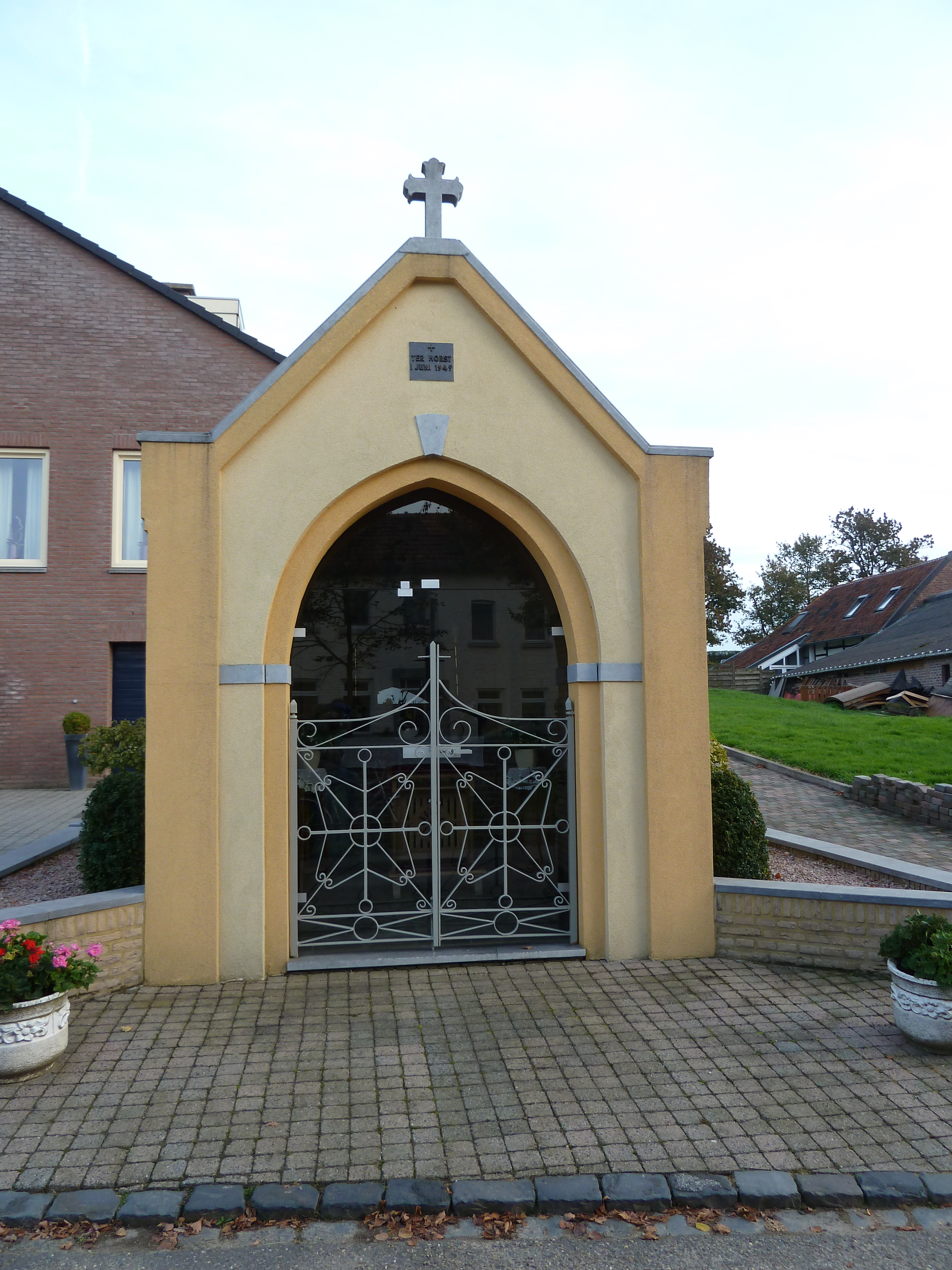
Chapel in Terhorst

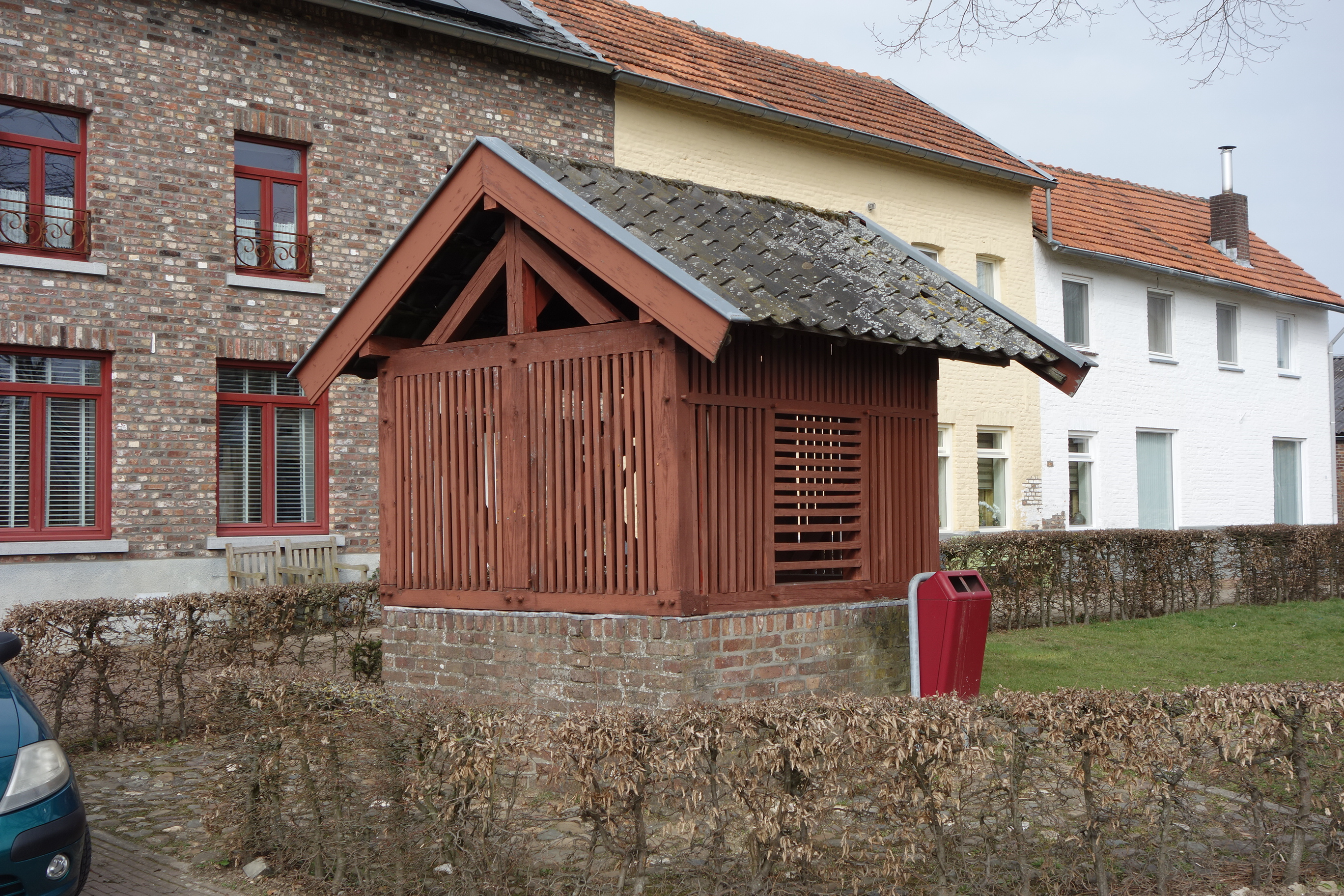
Water well
