= Delmar, New York =

- Hamlet
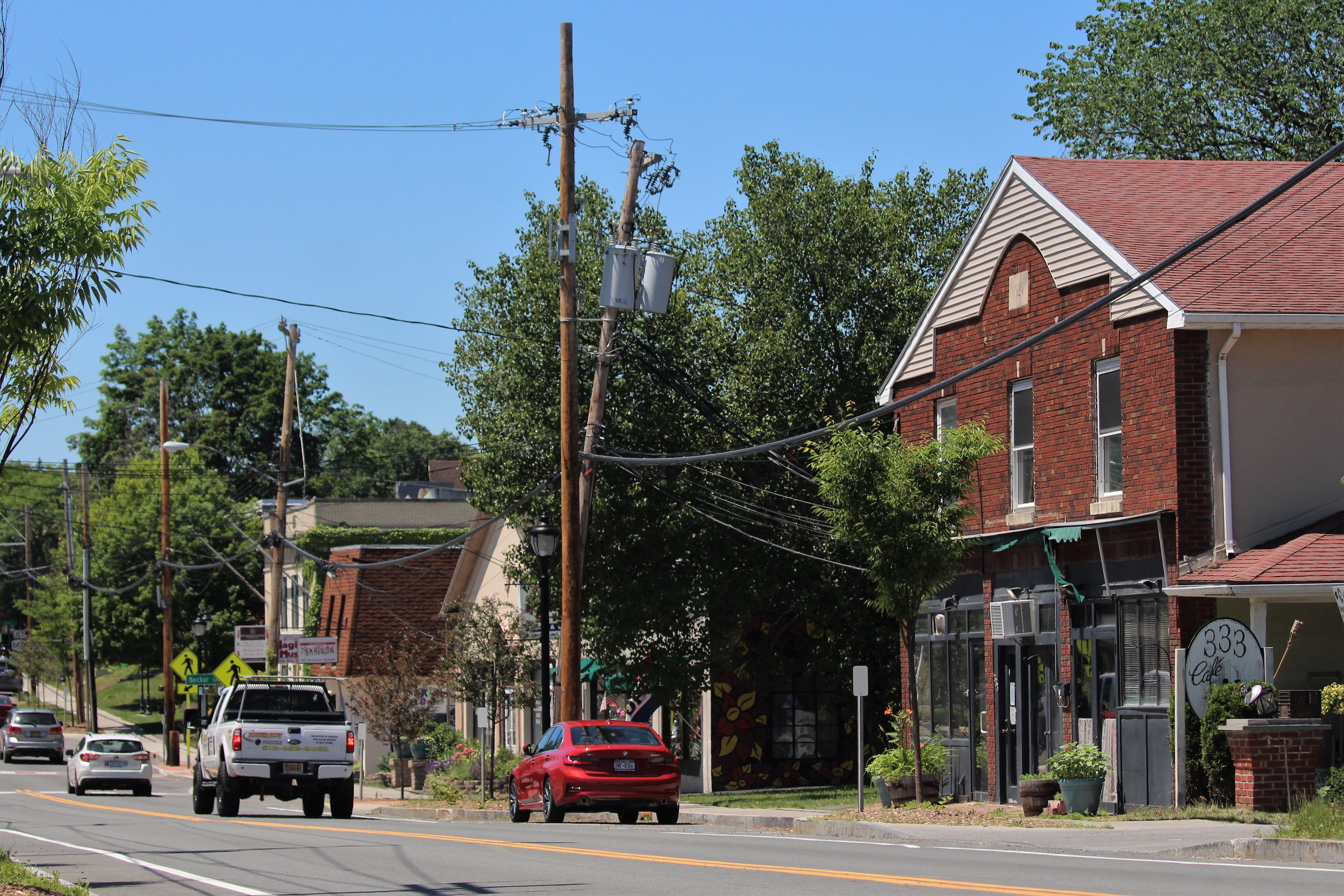
- A cafe on Delaware Avenue in Delmar

- Location within New York Location within the United States
- Coordinates: 42°37′05″N 73°50′12″W
- Country: United States
- State: New York
- Region: Capital District
- County: Albany County
- Town: Bethlehem

Area
  - Total: 4.382 sq mi (11.35 km^{2})
  - Land: 4.382 sq mi (11.35 km^{2})
  - Water: 0.0 sq mi (0 km^{2})
- Elevation: 223 ft (68 m)

Population (2000)
  - Total: 8,292
  - Density: 1,892/sq mi (730.6/km^{2})
- Time zone: UTC-5 (EST)
  - Summer (DST): UTC-4 (EDT)
- ZIP code: 12054
- Area code: 518
- FIPS code: 36-20148
- GNIS feature ID: 948278

Delmar is a hamlet in the Town of Bethlehem, in Albany County, New York, United States. It is a suburb of the neighboring city of Albany. The community is bisected by NY Route 443 (Delaware Avenue), a major thoroughfare, main street, and route to Albany.

In 1980, the U.S. Census Bureau began treating Delmar as a census-designated place (CDP). The population of Delmar was 8,292 at the 2000 census. Delmar was not included as a CDP in the 2010 census.

In 2005, CNN/Money Magazine named the Delmar ZIP Code (an area larger than the Delmar CDP) as one of the "Best Places to Live" in America, rating it the 22nd best place to live among what it called "Great American Towns."

== History ==
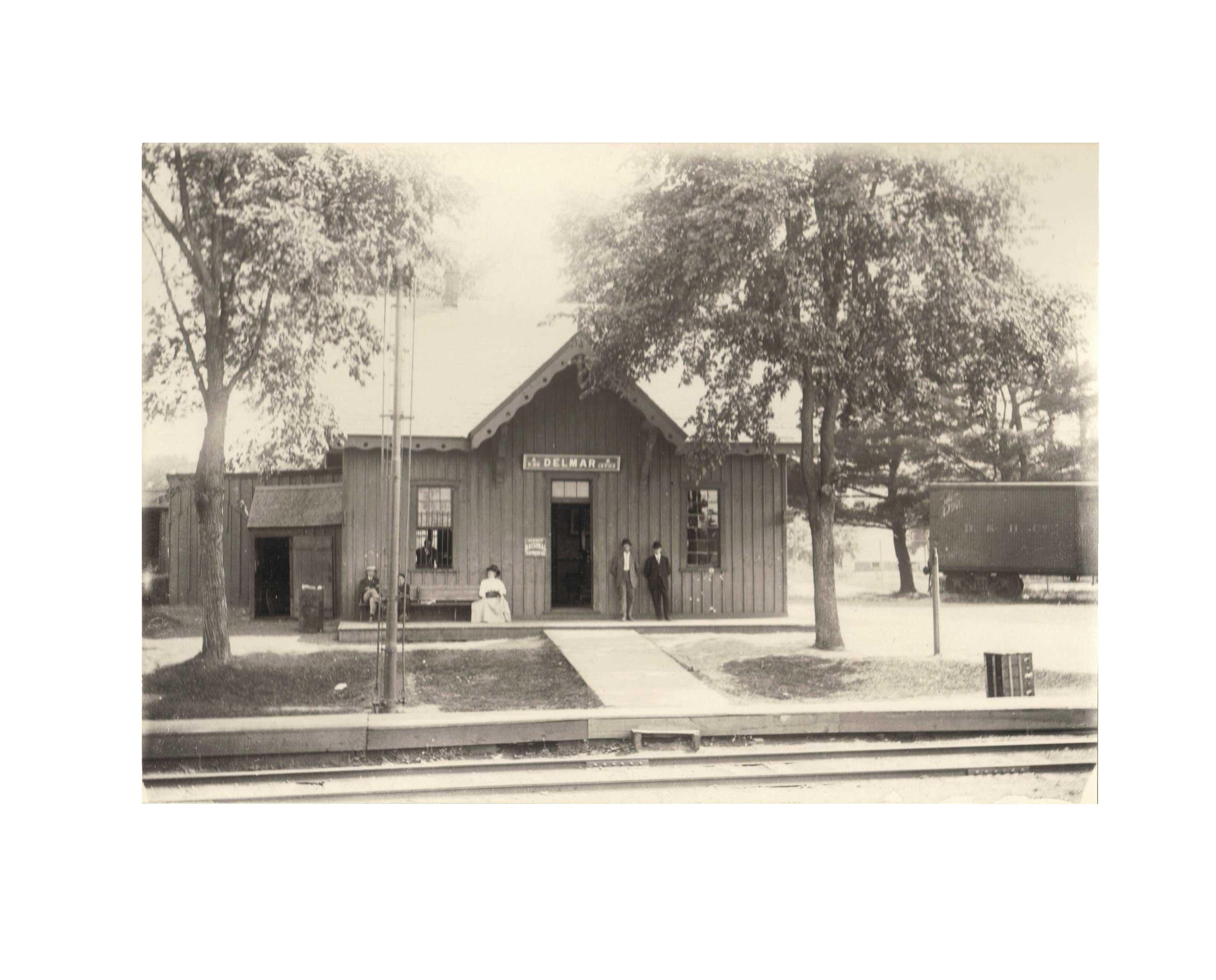
Albany and Susquehanna Railroad's Delmar Station, 1907

Nathaniel Adams moved to the area in 1836 and, two years later, built a large hotel and made other improvements. When the first post office was built in 1840, he became the first post master. The Adams Hotel was Bethlehem's Town Hall from 1950 to 1980. For Nathaniel Adams, Delmar received its early name of Adamsville.

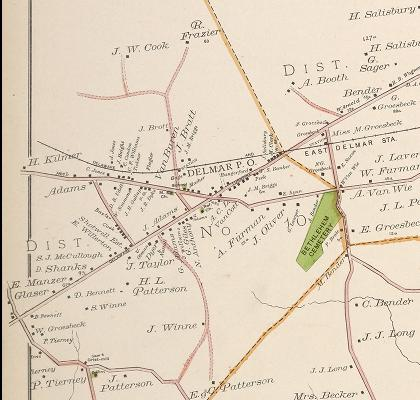
Map of Delmar in 1891

After Adamsville received its post office, mail began to get confused with the town of Adams, New York, which also had an Adams Village. The name of the post office was changed to Adams Station in an attempt to relieve that confusion. The Albany and Susquehanna Railroad, which had a station on Adams Street north of Kenwood Avenue, however, had chosen to change from Adamsville to Delmar. In 1892, a petition by area residents to change the post office to match Delmar was accepted.

The Patterson Farmhouse, United States Post Office, and Van Derheyden House are listed on the National Register of Historic Places.

== Geography ==
As a hamlet, the borders of Delmar are indeterminate, though it is considered to be centered on the intersection of Kenwood and Delaware Avenues. According to the 2000 United States census, the CDP has a total area of 4.382 square miles (11.35 km^{2}), all land. A 2010 reference map laid out the boundaries of the Delmar CDP.

== Demographics ==
Delmar Historical Populations
Year	Pop.	±%
1980	8,423	—
1990	8,360	−0.7%
2000	8,292	−0.8%
Sources: Censuses 1980; and 1990 and 2000.

As of the census of 2000, there were 8,292 people, 3,420 households, and 2,373 families residing in the CDP. The population density was 1,892.4 inhabitants per square mile (730.7/km^{2}). There were 3,501 housing units at an average density of 799.0 per square mile (308.5/km^{2}). The racial makeup of the CDP was 96.61% White, 1.24% Asian, 1.18% African American, 0.12% Native American, 0.01% Pacific Islander, 0.25% from other races, and 0.58% from two or more races. 1.23% of the population were Hispanic or Latino of any race.

There were 3,420 households, out of which 33.3% had children under the age of 18 living with them, 60.0% were married couples living together, 7.4% had a female householder with no husband present, and 30.6% were non-families. 26.7% of all households were made up of individuals, and 12.7% had someone living alone who was 65 years of age or older. The average household size was 2.41 and the average family size was 2.94.

In the CDP, the population was spread out, with 25.4% under the age of 18, 4.5% from 18 to 24, 24.3% from 25 to 44, 28.9% from 45 to 64, and 16.9% who were 65 years of age or older. The median age was 43 years. For every 100 females, there were 90.4 males. For every 100 females age 18 and over, there were 84.9 males.

The median income for a household in the CDP was $64,438, and the median income for a family was $83,219. Males had a median income of $57,038 versus $37,133 for females. The per capita income for the CDP was $35,363. 2.4% of the population and 1.7% of families were below the poverty line. Out of the total population, 3.0% of those under the age of 18 and 0.8% of those 65 and older were living below the poverty line.

== Education ==
Residents in the former Delmar CDP are zoned to Bethlehem Central School District.

== Notable people ==
- Edward Burton Hughes (1905-6 June 1987) — transportation commissioner; longtime resident
- Megyn Kelly — American journalist and media personality
- Matt Quatraro — manager of Kansas City Royals starting with the 2026 season
- Christopher Porco — convicted of the attempted murder of his mother and murder of his father
- Eva Marie Saint — film actress over seven decades
- Portia Wu — secretary of the Maryland Department of Labor
- Scott Ritter — Former US military and UN inspector, now author, geopolitical analyst and convicted sex offender
