= Patterson Farmhouse (Delmar, New York) =

Historic house in New York, United States

- U.S. National Register of Historic Places
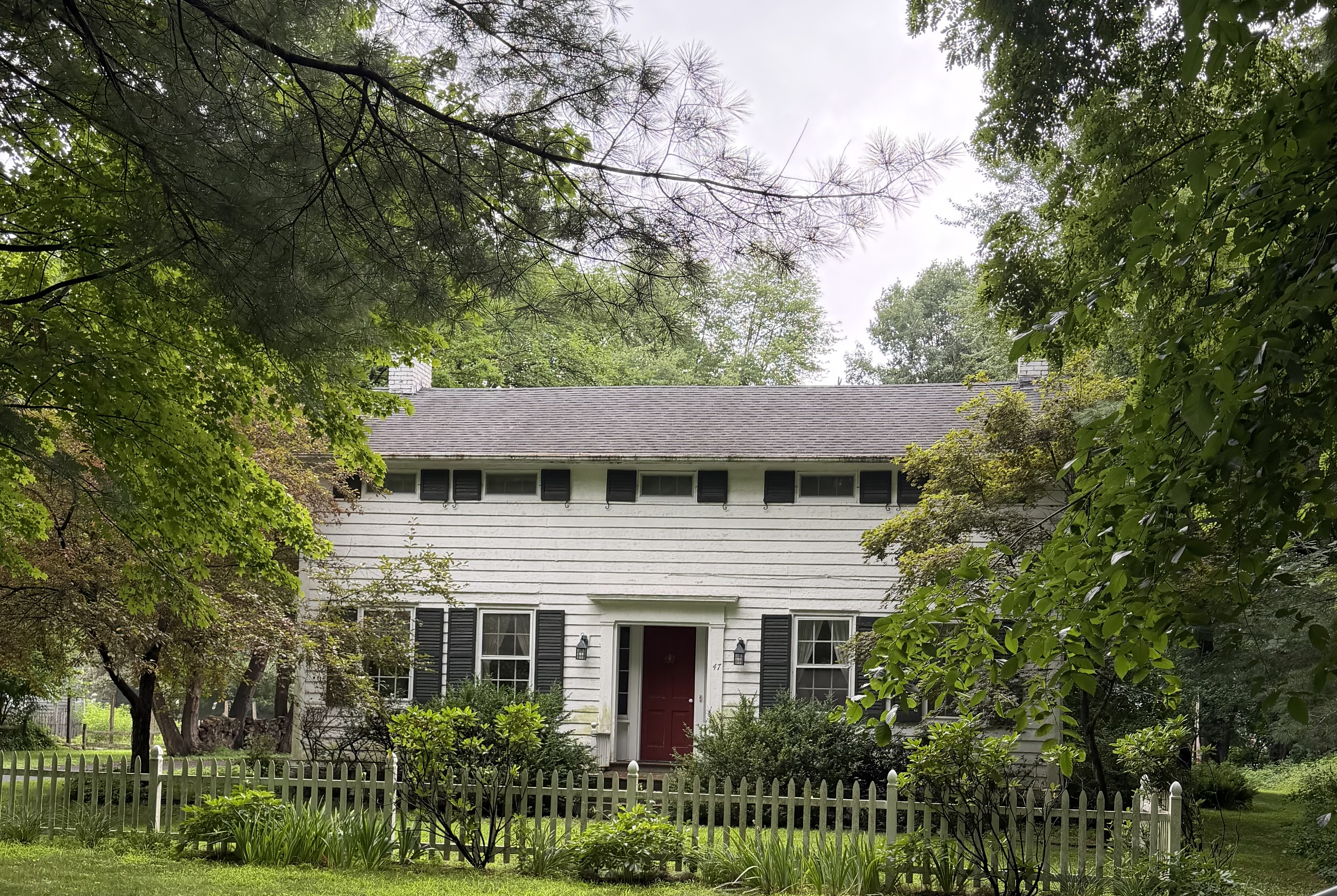

- Location within New York Location within the United States
- Location: 47 Murray Ave., Delmar, New York
- Coordinates: 42°36′38″N 73°50′33″W
- Area: 1.5 acres (0.61 ha)
- Built: 1840
- Architectural style: Greek Revival
- NRHP reference No.: 96001427
- Added to NRHP: April 28, 1997

Patterson Farmhouse is a historic home located at Delmar in Albany County, New York. It was built around 1840 and is a two-story, side gabled frame dwelling two rooms deep with a kitchen wing. The front entry is Greek Revival in style; surrounded by narrow sidelights and a rectangular line of transom lights above.

It was listed on the National Register of Historic Places in 1997.
