= Jacques Verheyen =

Dutch painter

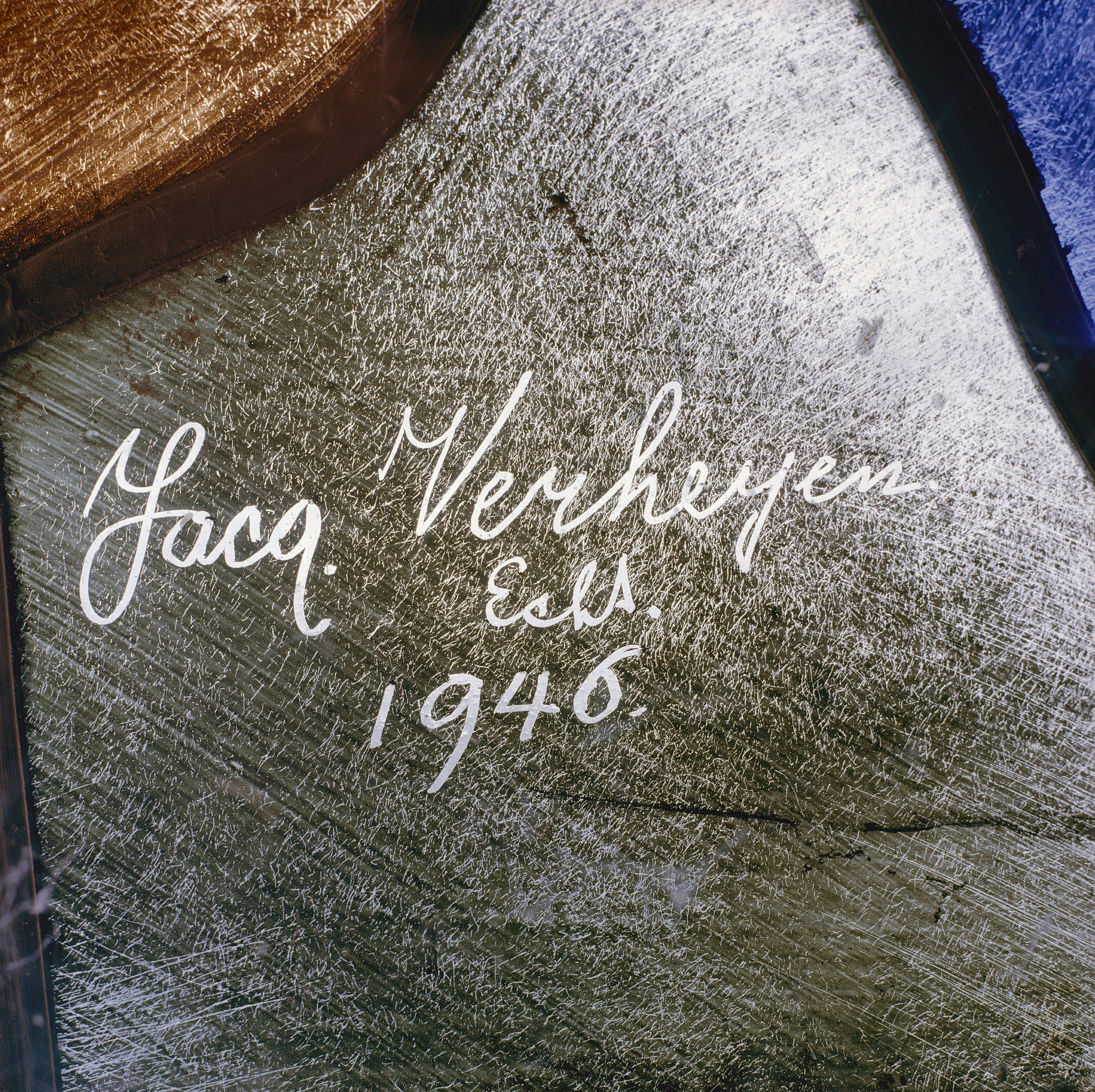
- Born: 5 February 1911; Echt, Netherlands
- Died: 20 August 1989 (aged 78); Sittard, Netherlands
- Education: Teekenschool in Roermond, Nijverheidschool in Roermond, Joan Collette and Jean den Rooijen
- Known for: Painter, glazier

Jacobus Hubertus (Jacques) Verheyen (5 February 1911 – 20 August 1989) was a Dutch glazier and painter.

== Life and work ==
Verheyen, also Verheijen, was educated at the Teekenschool in Roermond as a pupil of Joan Collette and with Jean den Rooijen at the Nijverheidschool. From 1928 he worked in Den Rooijen's studio. In 1935 he established himself as an independent artist in Echt. He was responsible for the design and glass painting, while the technical side of the work was carried out at various studios. In addition to stained glass windows, Verheyen made mosaics and murals, especially religious art for churches and chapels. He made the stained glass windows and the 14 Stations of the Cross in the Chapel of Our Lady in Schilberg. He carried out assignments in the Netherlands, Belgium, Germany, France, Ghana, Gabon, Canada, USA and Indonesia.

== Gallery ==
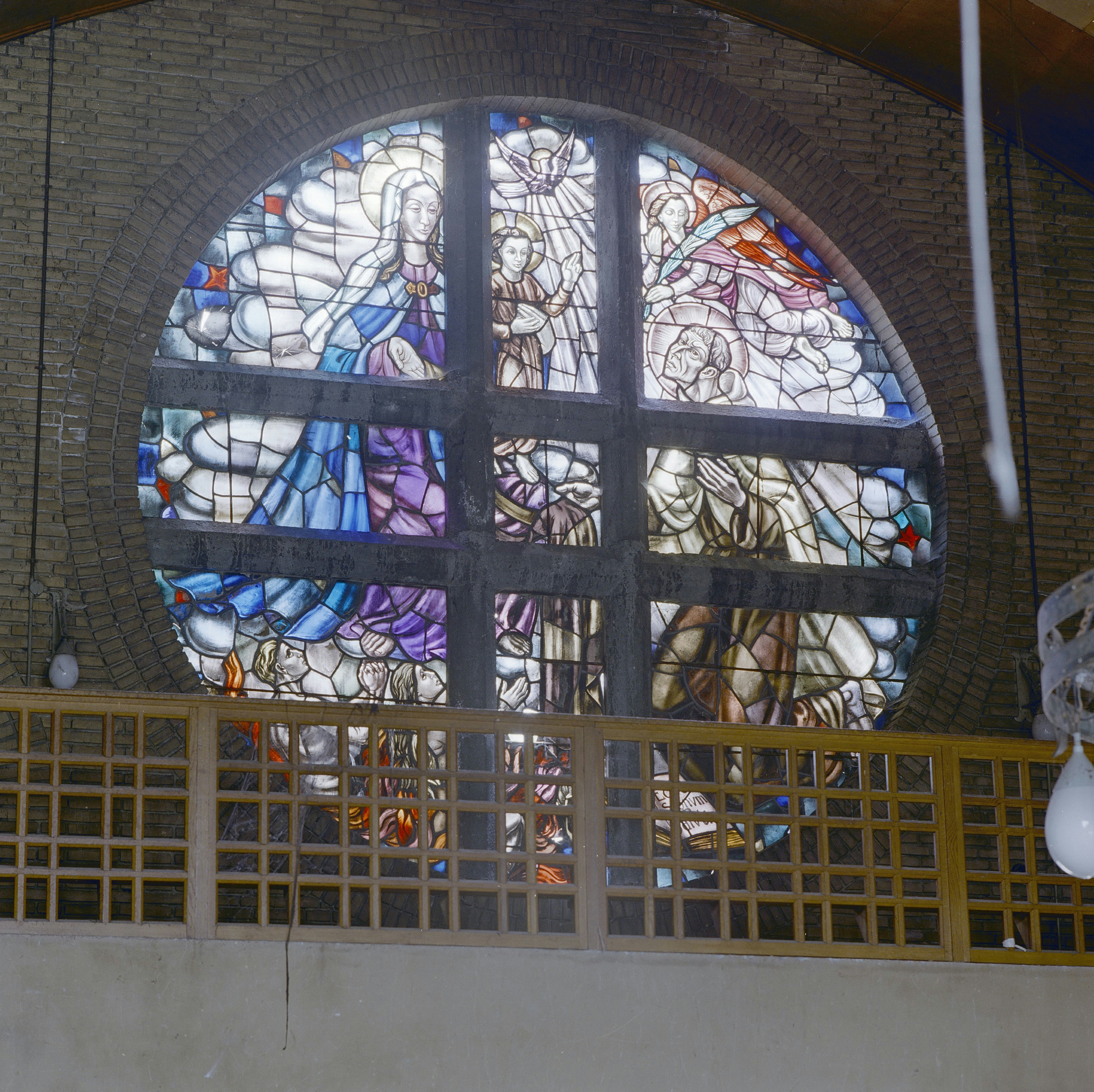
Paterskerk, Geleen

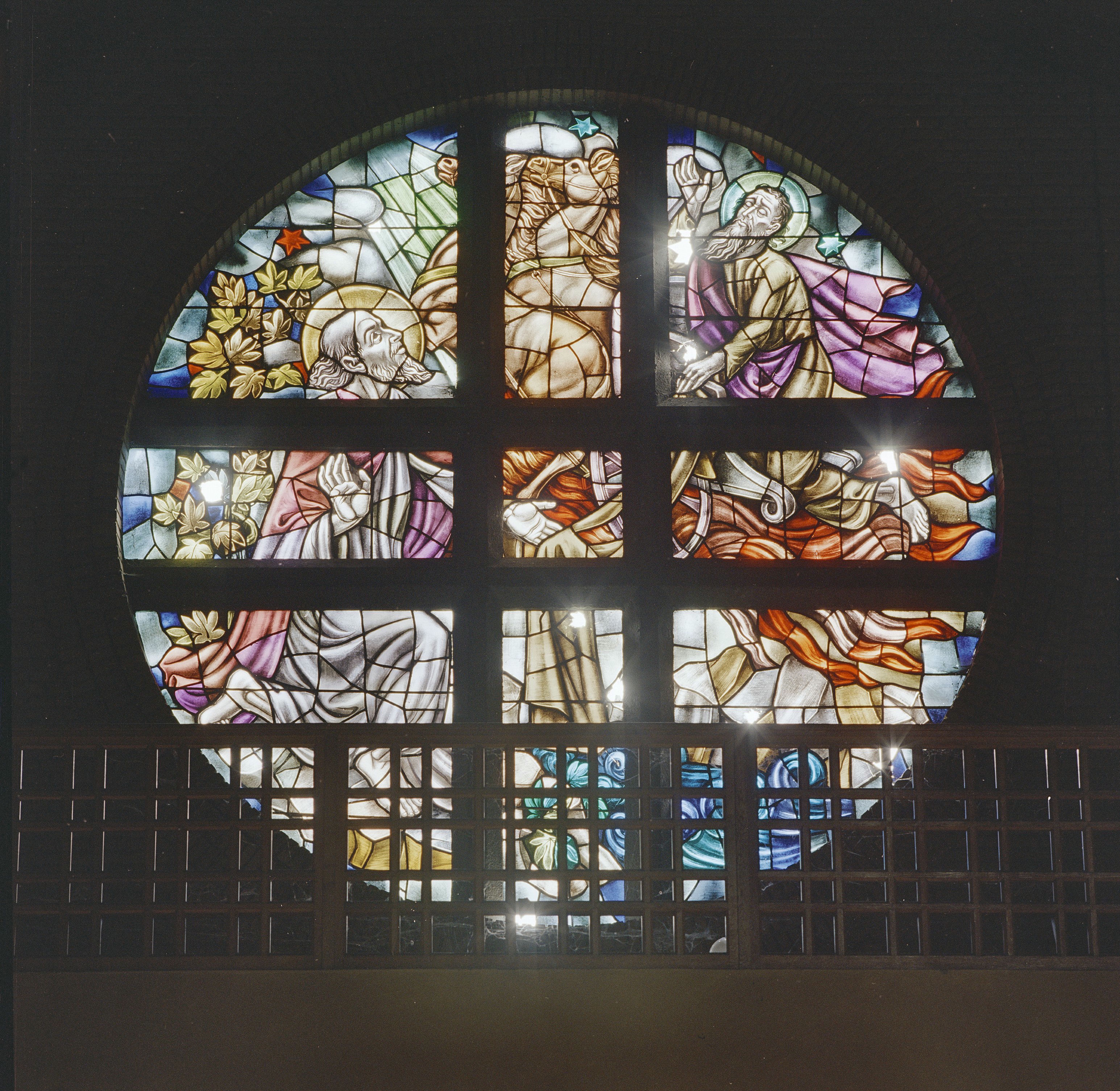
Paterskerk, Geleen
