= Van der Meijden =

Van der Meijden is a Dutch surname. Notable people with the surname include:

- Henk van der Meijden (born 1937), Dutch journalist and theatre manager
- Ilse van der Meijden (born 1988), Dutch water polo player

== See also ==
- Van der Meij / Meij
- Van der Heijden
