= Jean den Rooijen =

Dutch painter

- Born: 2 January 1866; Roermond, Netherlands
- Died: 12 February 1939 (aged 73); Heel en Panheel, Netherlands
- Known for: Glazier

Johannes Hubertus Petrus Josephus (Jean) den Rooijen (2 January 1866 – 12 February 1939) was a Dutch glazier.

== Life and work ==
Den Rooijen and his younger brother Piet (1867–1913) learned the trade as glass painters at the Roermond atelier F. Nicolas en Zonen. In 1895 Den Rooijen, assisted by his brother, started his own studio. It was known as gebrs. Den Rooijen. Piet had to stop working in 1908 due to illness and died a few years later. Jean continued the business alone. Work was done in a traditional, mostly neo-Gothic style. In addition to own designs, work was carried out for Joan Collette, Frans Cox and Huib Luns, among others.

Jean den Rooijen died in 1939, at the age of 73. The studio was continued by his widow, until she sold it to JHM Wielders in 1951.

== Works ==
- Stained glass windows (1902-1924) for the Sint-Martinuskerk in Weert
- Stained glass windows (1905-1928) for the Sint-Nicolaaskerk in Edam
- Stained glass (1911-1912) for the Sint Gerlachuskerk in Banholt
- Stained glass windows (1913) in the choir of the Sint-Servatiuskerk in Westerhoven
- Stained glass windows (1927-1928) for the Sint-Lambertuskerk in Helmond
- Stained glass windows (1930) for the chapel of Klooster Opveld in Maastricht

== Gallery ==
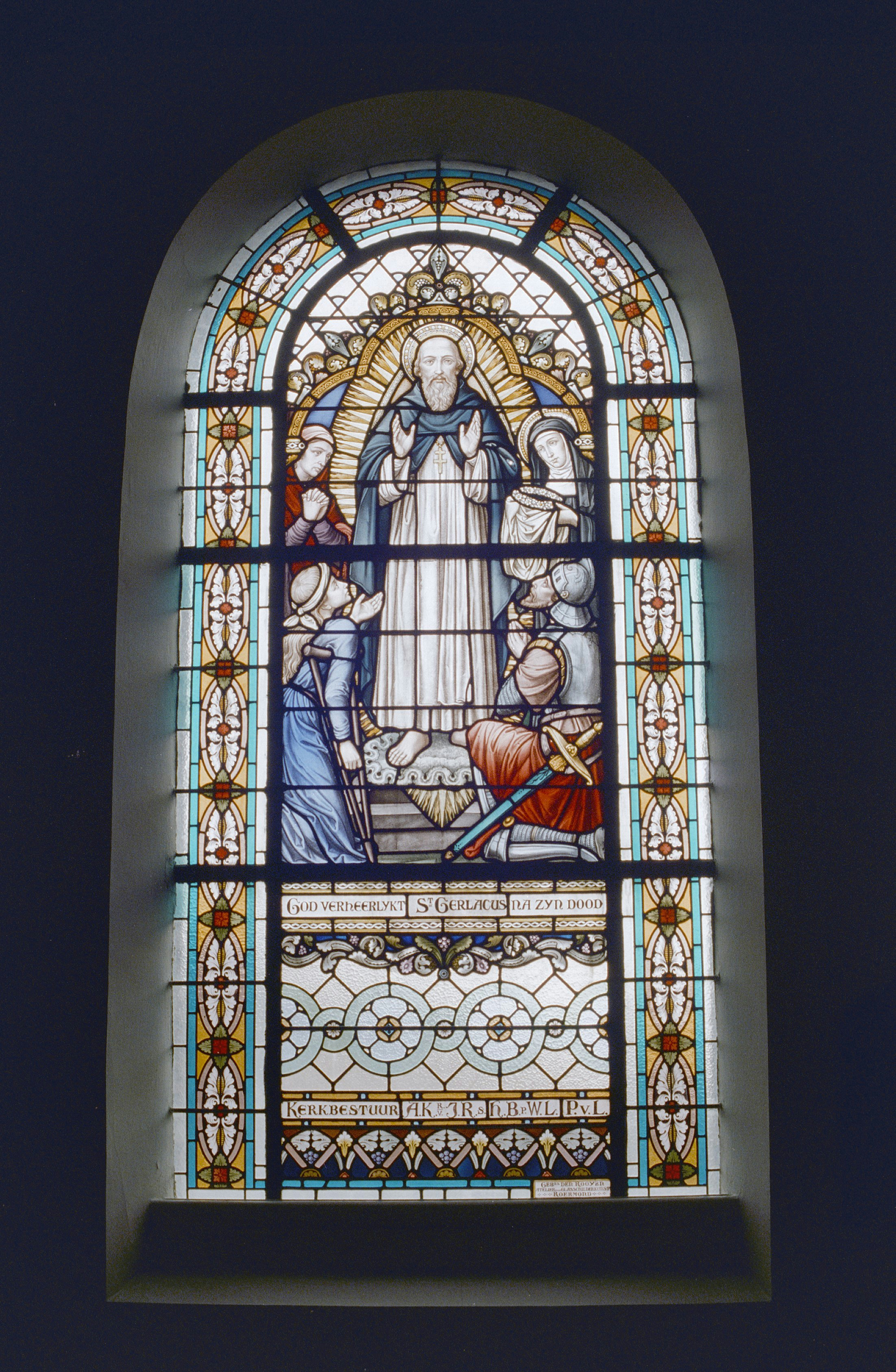
Window in Gerlachuskerk, Banholt

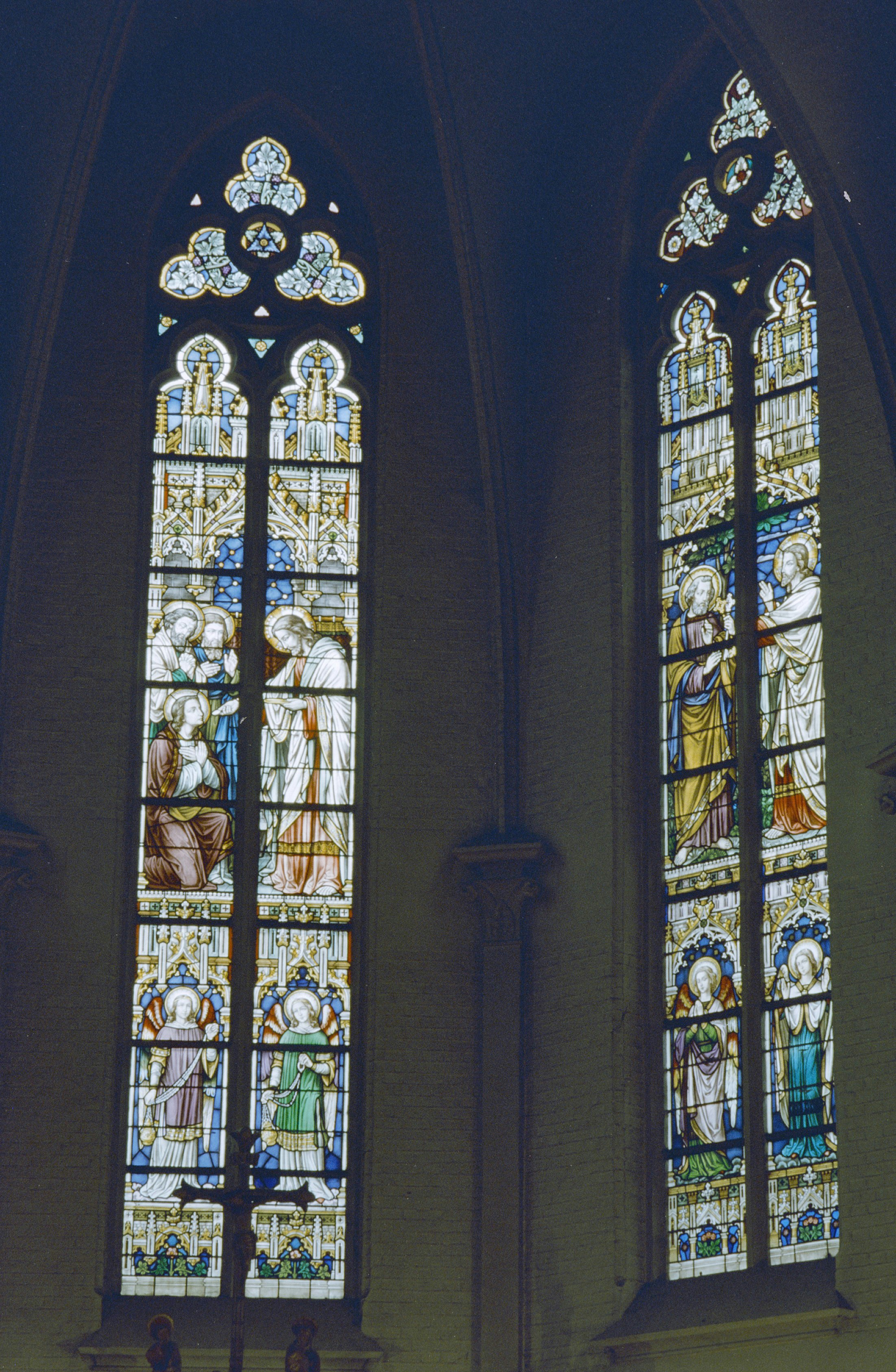
Window in Sint Servatiuskerk, Westerhoven

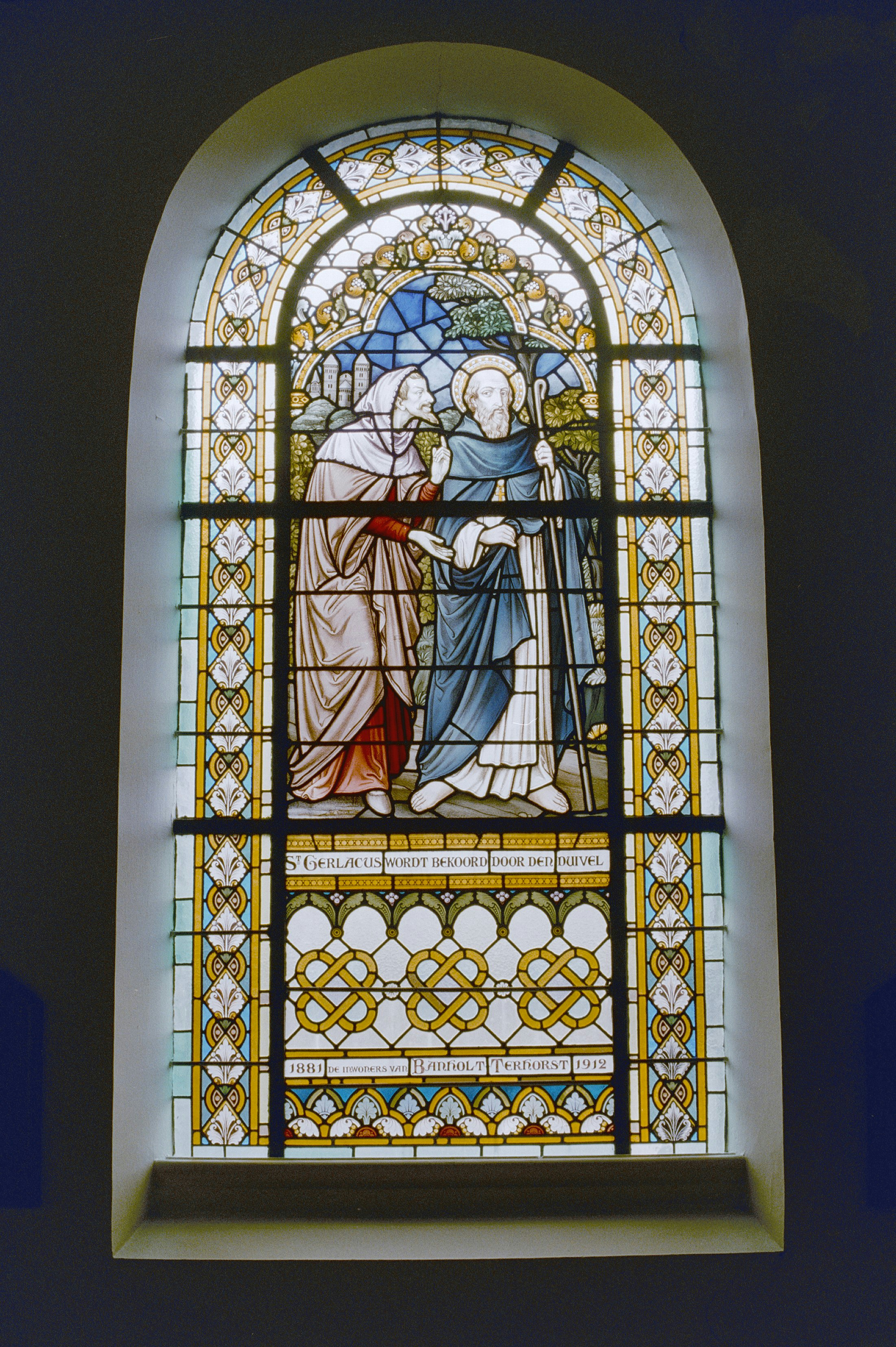
Window in Gerlachuskerk, Banholt
