= United States Post Office (Delmar, New York) =

- U.S. Post Office
- U.S. National Register of Historic Places
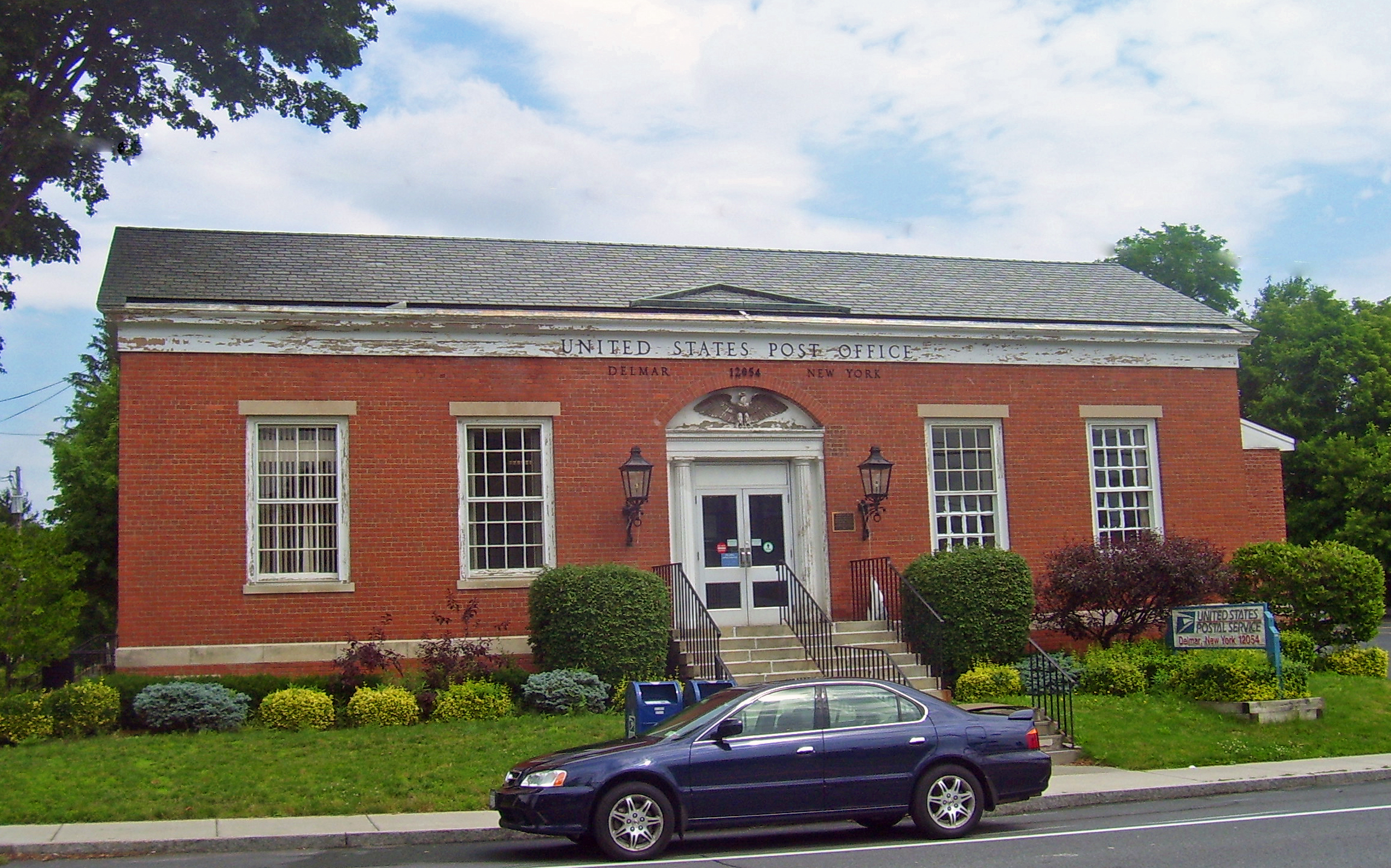
- Front (south) elevation, 2008

- Location within New York Location within the United States
- Location: Delmar, NY
- Nearest city: Albany
- Coordinates: 42°37′20″N 73°49′57″W
- Built: 1939–40
- Architect: Louis Simon
- Architectural style: Colonial Revival
- MPS: US Post Offices in New York State, 1858-1943, TR
- NRHP reference No.: 88002480
- Added to NRHP: 1988

The U.S. Post Office in Delmar, New York is located on Delaware Avenue (NY 443) in the middle of the hamlet. It serves the 12054 ZIP Code, covering Delmar and its surrounding area. It was added to the National Register of Historic Places in 1988. To date it is the only current post office in Albany County on the Register.

It is a small brick building constructed in 1939, near the end of the Great Depression. Louis A. Simon, the Treasury Department's supervising architect at that time, designed 13 total post offices for New York in the Colonial Revival style similar to Delmar's. But that one was the only one from whose design he omitted a cupola. The lobby is decorated with a mural auspices, showing a scene of the Indian Ladder at nearby John Boyd Thacher State Park.

== Building ==
The post office is a one-story, five-bay brick building with stone water table. Its double-doored main entrance is at the top of a set of granite steps with iron railings. The door is surrounded by fluted Doric pilasters and an entablature; above it is a fanlight with cast aluminum eagle. The words "UNITED STATES POST OFFICE" are spelled out in bronze letters across the frieze, with "DELMAR 12054 NEW YORK" above the door.

On either side of the door are two original lamps and two windows with limestone sills and lintels. A wooden dentiled cornice runs around the roofline. Above it is a slate gabled roof.

The side elevations have a pair of windows each. The gable ends are sided in clapboard with a semicircular opening with radiating mullions. At the rear are two wings: one three-bay workroom wing where the cornice is replaced with a parapet. A four-bay wing, added later, duplicates the roof detailing on the main building but is not considered contributing.

On the inside, the entry leads to a wooden vestibule with paneled pilasters. The L-shaped lobby has a red-and-black terrazzo floor, white marble dado and dark marble baseboards. They give way to plaster, which forms a simple cornice at the junction of wall and ceiling. A 1940 mural, "The Indian Ladder", by Works Progress Administration artist Sol Wilson fills the wall above the postmaster's office. Many of the original furnishings remain.

== History ==
Delmar had had a post office since 1840, in space leased in a building on Elsemere Avenue. A single-family house, demolished after the new building was authorized in the mid-1930s, stood on the present site. General contractors Loucks and Clarke of Wallingford, Connecticut won the bid and broke ground in 1939, opening the new building the following year.

The post office has seen only one significant change since then. The rear wing was built in 1959 to handle increased volume.

== Aesthetics ==
Louis Simon, Supervising Architect of the Treasury Department, under whose jurisdiction the Post Office was at the time, designed 13 post offices in New York in a variation of the same basic model. Of these, Delmar's is the only one to not include a cupola in its original design (Attica's had one when built, but it has since been removed).
