= Vermeyen =

Vermeyen is a Dutch surname. Notable people with the surname include:

- Frans Vermeyen (1943–2014), Belgian footballer
- Jan Cornelisz Vermeyen (c. 1500–1559), Dutch Northern Renaissance painter
- Jan Vermeyen (before 1559–1606), Flemish artist and goldsmith
