= Van Derheyden House =

Historic house in New York, United States

- U.S. National Register of Historic Places
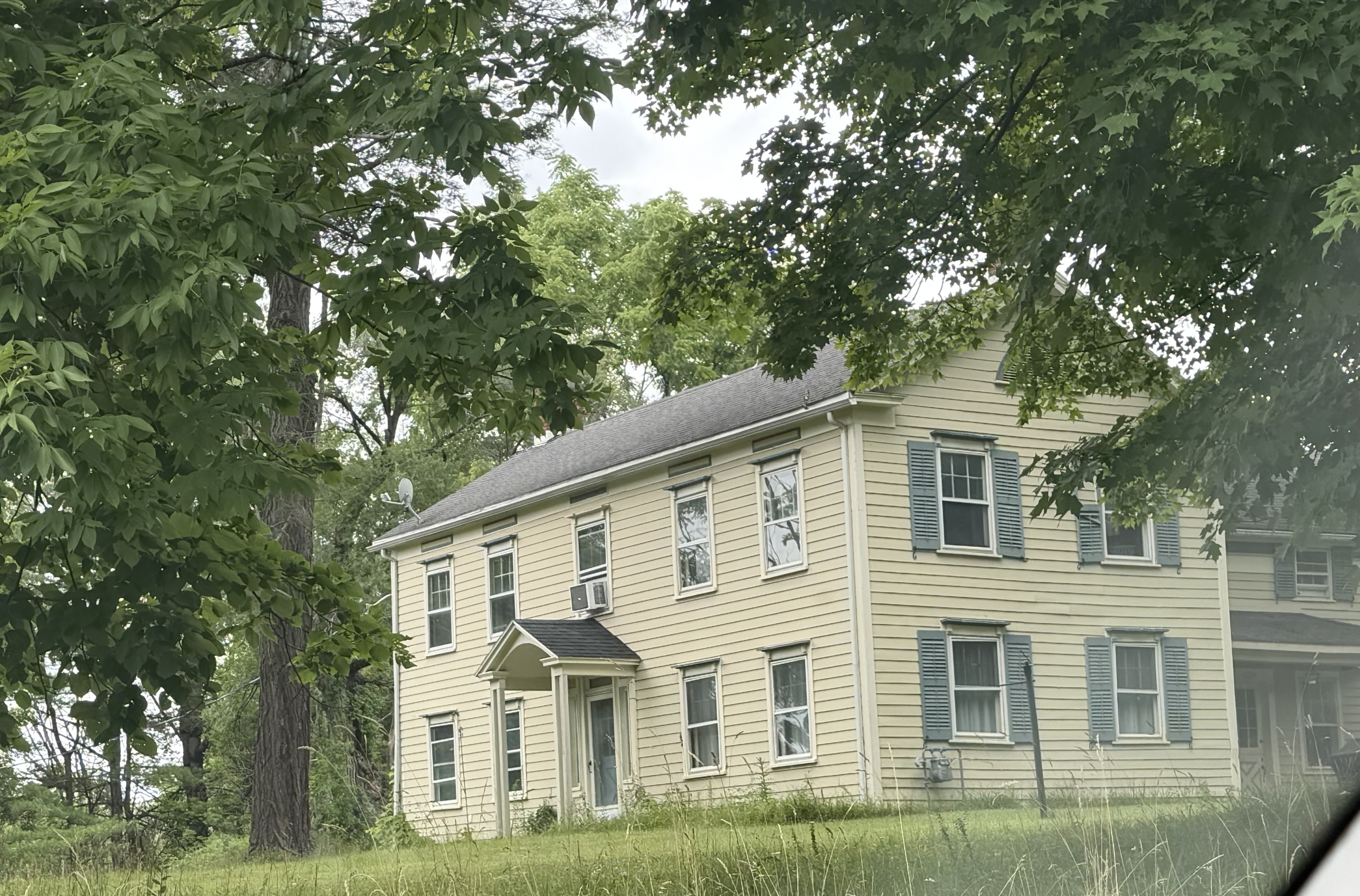

- Location within New York Location within the United States
- Location: 823 Delaware Ave., Delmar, New York
- Coordinates: 42°36′37″N 73°52′2″W
- Area: 5 acres (2.0 ha)
- Built: 1804
- Architectural style: Federal, Greek Revival
- NRHP reference No.: 01000582
- Added to NRHP: May 30, 2001

Van Derheyden House is a historic home located at Delmar in Albany County, New York. It was built in three phases. The original dwelling was constructed in 1804 as a "half house," expanded to the present five-bay form in the 1820s, and a large 2-story Greek Revival style rear addition was built in the 1850s. The main block is a 2 1/2-story center hall plan, Federal-style dwelling.

It was listed on the National Register of Historic Places in 2001.
