= Barbara Vanderhyden =

Canadian scientific researcher

Barbara Vanderhyden is a Canadian scientific researcher, currently the Corinne Bayer Chair in Ovarian Cancer Research at University of Ottawa Hospital Research Institute.

== Awards ==
- In 2014 Vanderhyden received the Grimes Research Career Achievement Award for her work on ovarian cancer.
