= Meiji =

Meiji, the romanization of the Japanese characters 明治, may refer to:

== Japanese history ==
- Emperor Meiji, Emperor of Japan between 1867 and 1912
  - Meiji era, the name given to that period in Japanese history
    - Meiji Restoration, the revolution that began the Meiji period
    - Meiji Constitution, the constitution of the Empire of Japan between 1890 and 1947
  - Meiji Shrine, a Shinto shrine dedicated to Emperor Meiji and his wife

== Other uses ==
- Meiji Holdings, a Japanese food and pharmaceutical holding company
  - Meiji Co., a Japanese food company
  - Meiji Seika Pharma, a Japanese pharmaceutical company
- Meiji-mura, an open-air architectural museum near Nagoya, Japan
- Meiji Seamount, a seamount (underwater mountain) in the northern Pacific Ocean
- Meiji Senmon Gakkou, the former name of the Kyushu Institute of Technology
- Meiji University, a university in Tokyo, Japan
- Meiji Yasuda Life, a Japanese life insurance company

== See also ==
- Meijer, a grocery chain store in the American Midwest
- Měijì, Hanyu Pinyin for the Chinese name of Mischief Reef (美济礁)
- Meij (disambiguation)
- Meji, Indian ceremonial bonfire
