= Sandra Vander-Heyden =

American field hockey player

Sandra Vander-Heyden (born December 26, 1964, in Nashua, New Hampshire) is an American former field hockey player who competed in the 1988 Summer Olympics.
