= JCJ Vanderheyden =

Dutch painter (1928–2012)

Jacobus Cornelis Johannes "Jacques" van der Heyden (professional name JCJ Vanderheyden) (23 June 1928 – 27 February 2012) was a Dutch painter and photographer.

== Life and work ==
JCJ Vanderheyden was born in 1928 in 's-Hertogenbosch. He studied from 1946 to 1956 at the Academy of Art and Design St. Joost in 's-Hertogenbosch and painting at the Jan van Eyck Academy in Maastricht. Van der Heyden was a guest lecturer repeatedly and taught from 1987 at the Rijksakademie van Beeldende Kunsten in Amsterdam.

Between 1964 and 1975 Vanderheyden experimented with film, new media, computer graphics, sound equipment, breathing exercises, photography and printing technology. In the 1970s in his studio Vanderheyden started to rearrange his own paintings, as well as the old masters (Hieronymus Bosch, Pieter Brueghel or Velasquez), so that installations were created, which he recorded as a photograph or with video. In the 1980s he concentrated on installations where his own paintings are displayed small or fragmented.

Trips to the Far East (1977), China (1989), the North Pole (1990) and in the Himalayas (1979 and 1986) inspired him to work, having the emptiness, the limitation and the reflection as subject. On the works the horizon is, however, never at a right angle to the plumb perpendicular, which can be seen repeatedly.
