= Verheijen =

Verheijen is a Dutch toponymic surname. It is a contraction of the surname Van der Heijden, meaning "from the heath". People with this surname include:

- Carl Verheijen (born 1975), Dutch speed skater, son of Eddy
- Eddy Verheijen (born 1946), Dutch speed skater, father of Carl
- Jan Hendrik Verheijen (1778–1846), Dutch painter
- Jan Verheijen (1896–1973), Dutch weightlifter
- Mark Verheijen (born 1976), Dutch politician
- Raymond Verheijen (born 1971), Dutch football coach
- Yasmin Verheijen (born 1994), Dutch designer, model and beauty pageant

== See also ==
- Verheyen, a common spelling variant
