= Banholt =

Banholt Tebannet
- Village
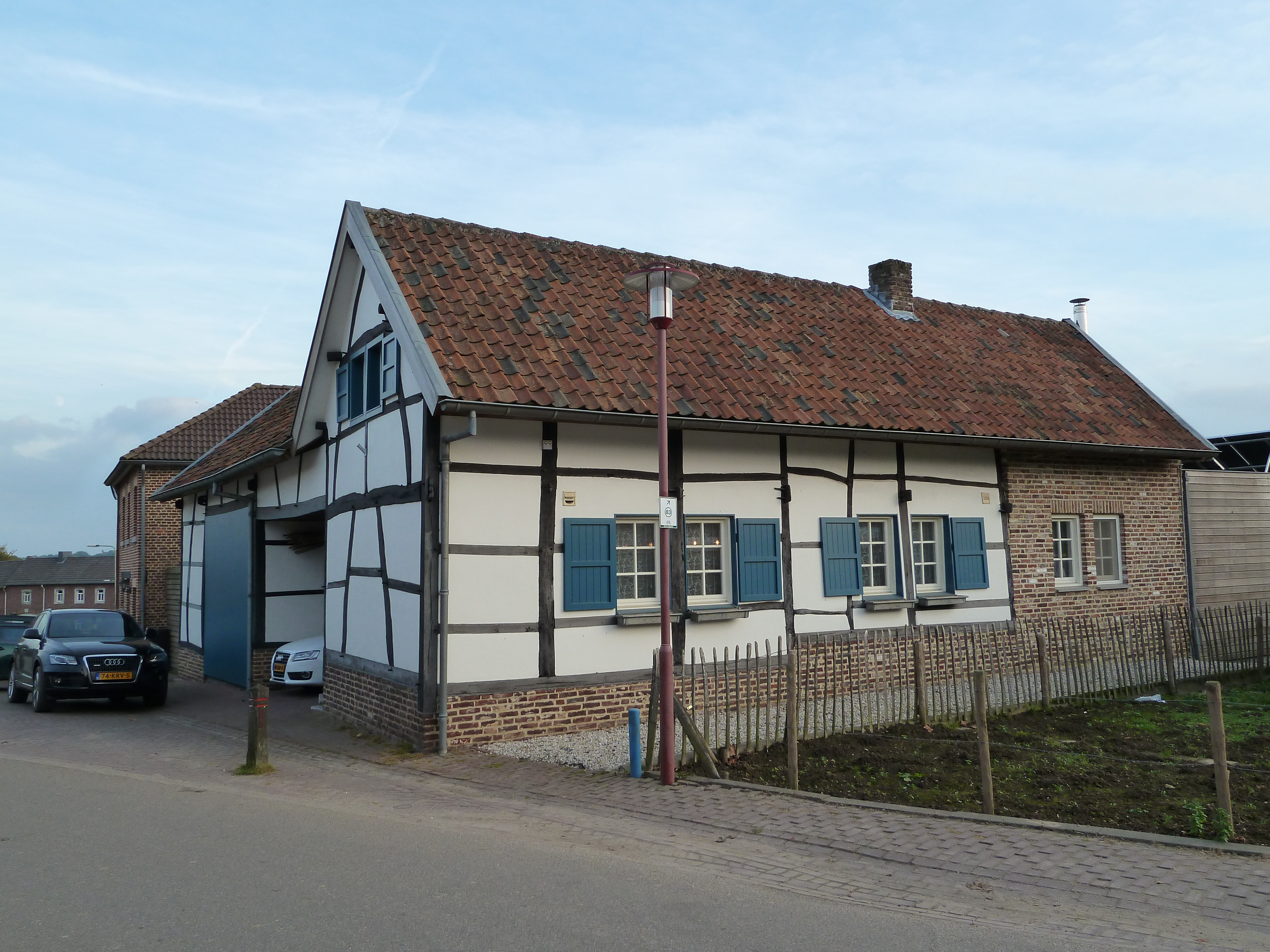
- Farm in Banholt

- Location in the Netherlands Location in the province of Limburg in the Netherlands
- Coordinates: 50°47′23″N 5°48′34″E
- Country: Netherlands
- Province: Limburg (Netherlands)
- Municipality: Eijsden-Margraten

Area
  - Total: 4.55 km^{2} (1.76 sq mi)
- Elevation: 173 m (568 ft)

Population (2021)
  - Total: 1,015
  - Density: 223/km^{2} (578/sq mi)
- Time zone: UTC+1 (CET)
  - Summer (DST): UTC+2 (CEST)
- Postal code: 6262
- Dialing code: 043
- Major roads: N278

Banholt (Limburgish: Tebannet) is a village in the Dutch province of Limburg. It is part of the municipality of Eijsden-Margraten and lies about 10 km southeast of Maastricht.

The village was first mentioned in 1294 or 1295 as Bannoyt. Banholt which developed in the Middle Ages on the plateau of Margraten. In the 18th century, it became a road village.

The Catholic St Gerlachus Church is a three aisled church with wide church which was constructed between 1874 and 1876. Banholt was home to 471 people in 1840.

== Gallery ==
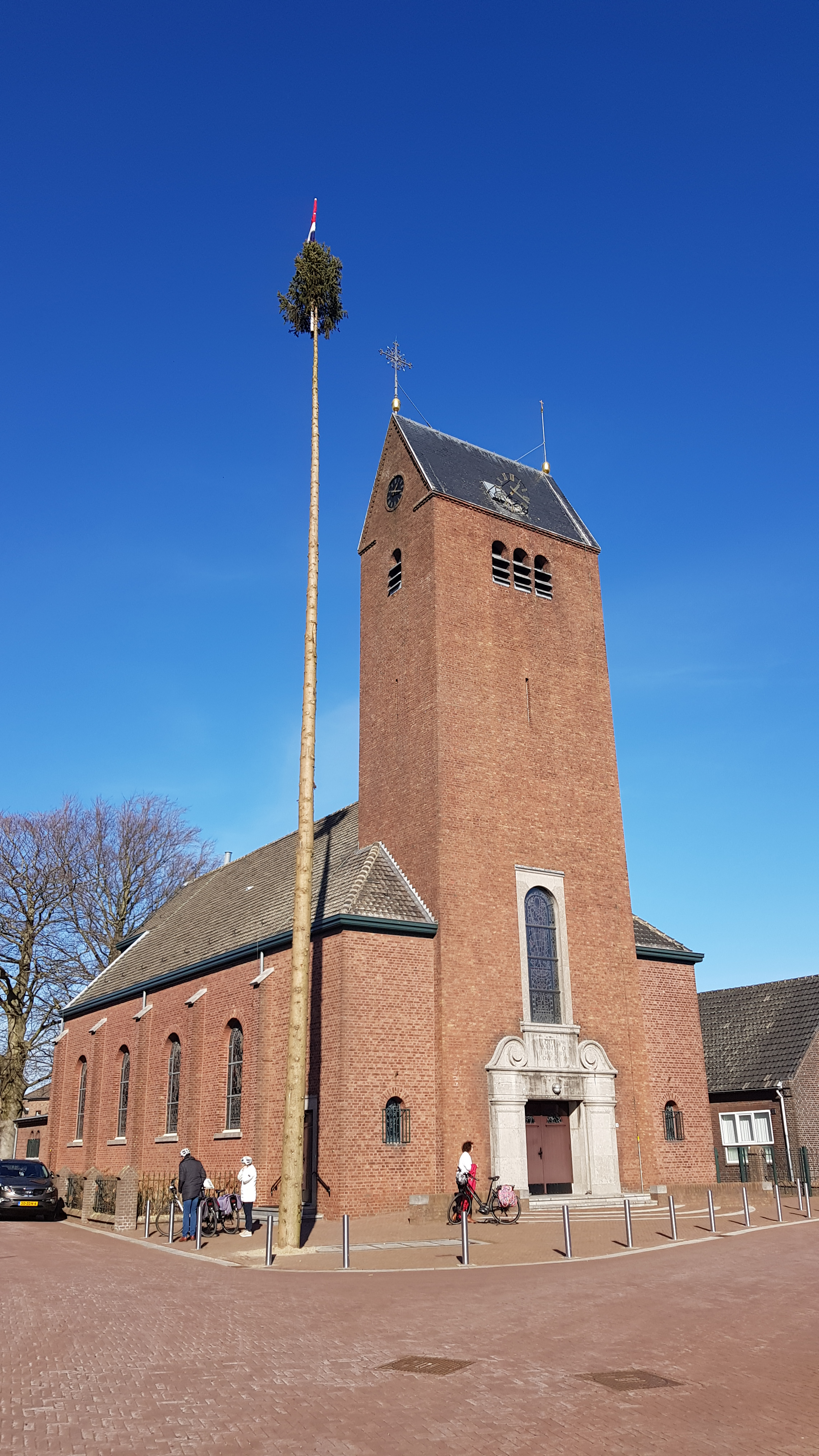
St Gerlachus Church

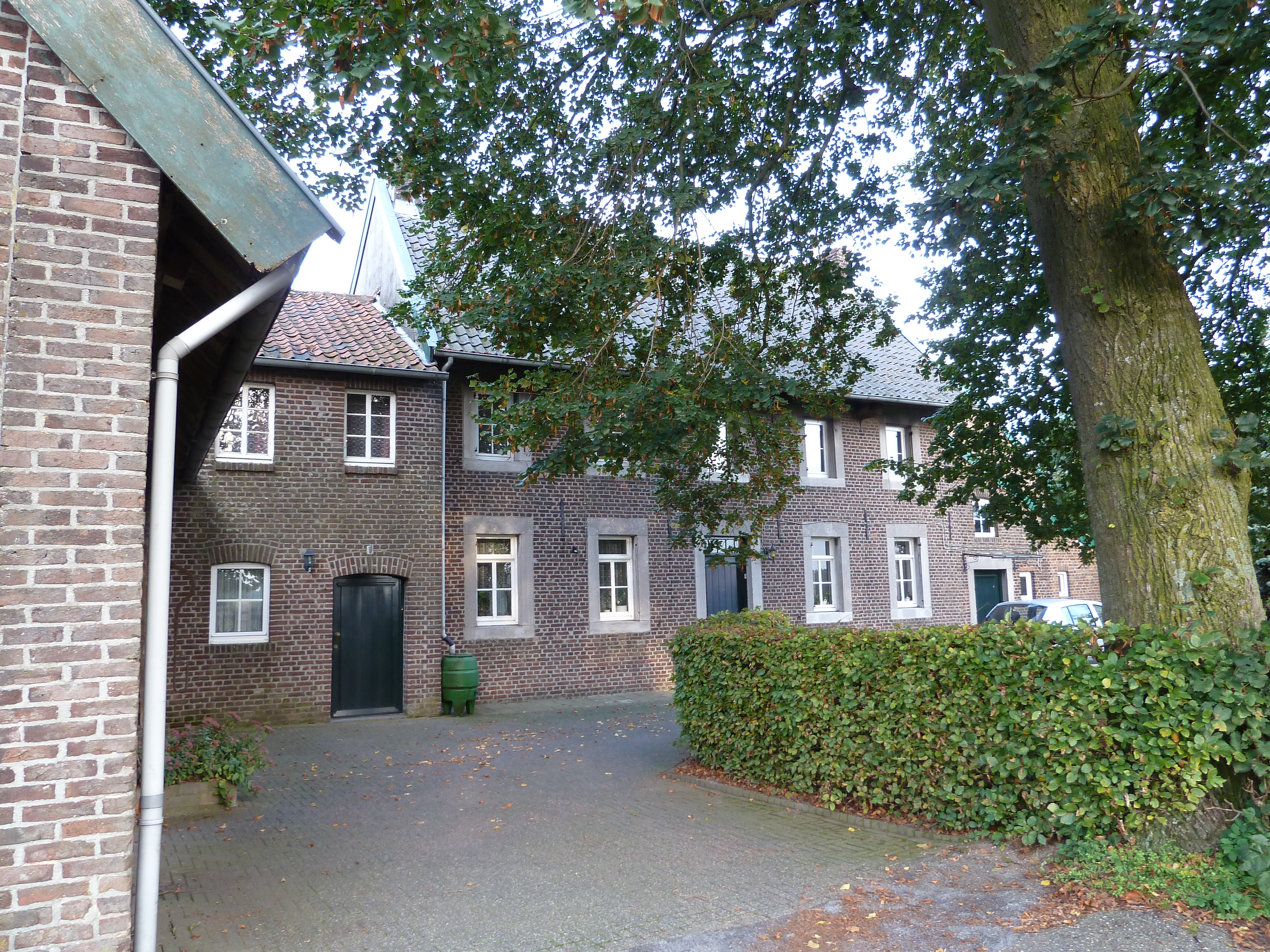
Court of a farm in Banholt

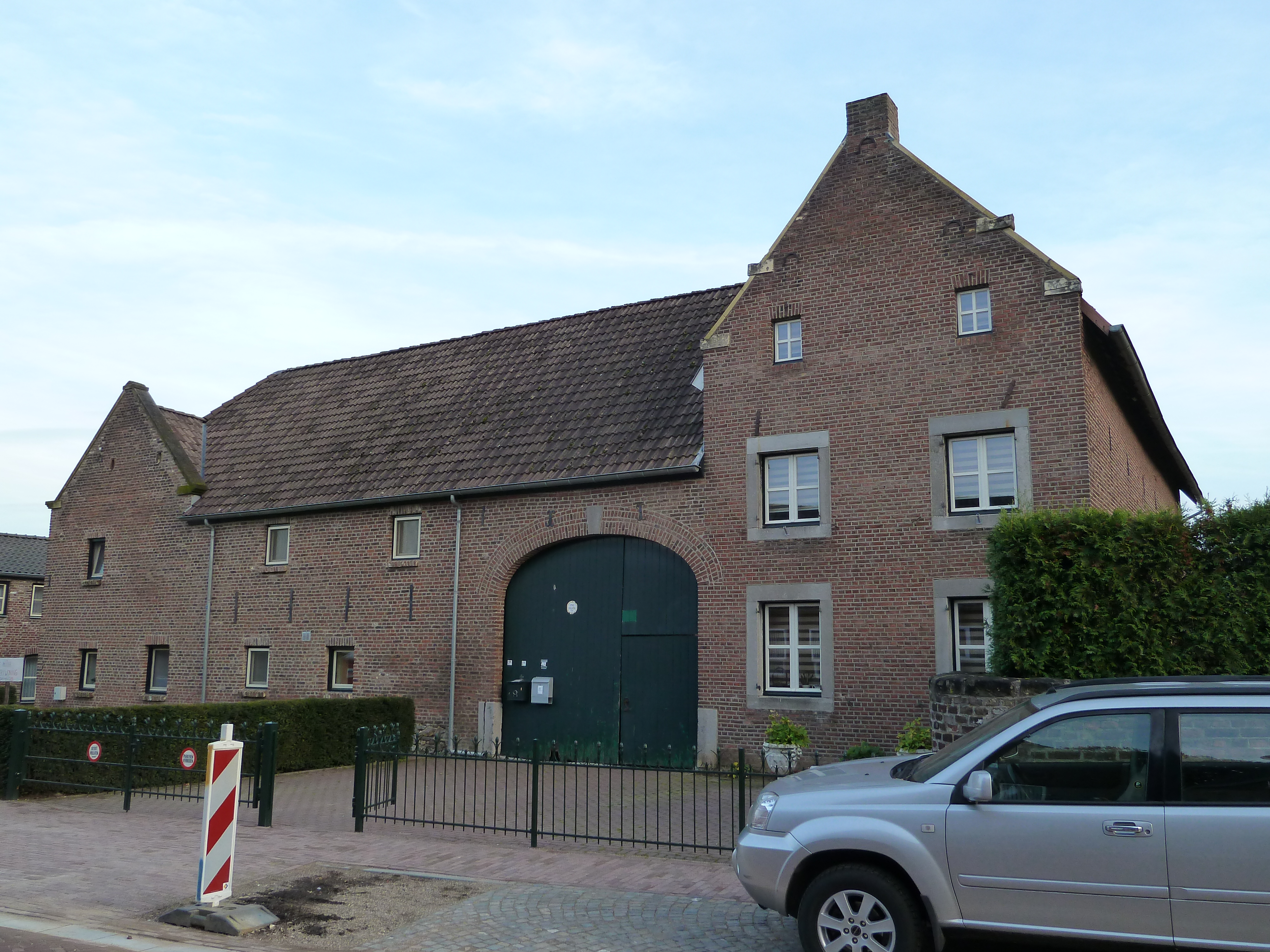
Building in Banholt
