= Sprouts of the Mohawk River =

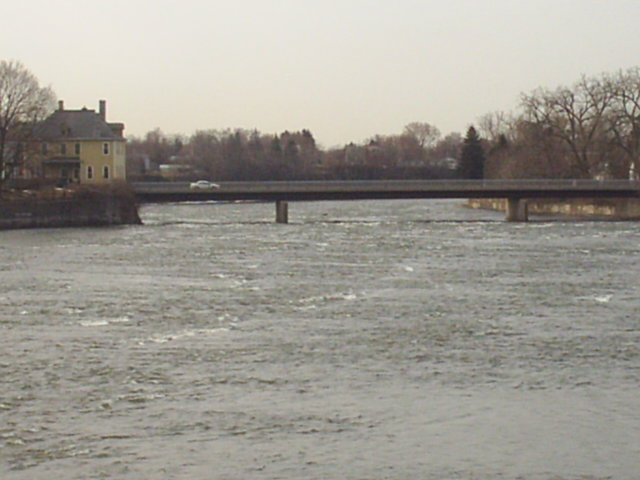
The First, or South, Branch of the Mohawk River, Simmons Island on the right and Van Schaick Island on the left

The Sprouts of the Mohawk River are the multiple channels of the Mohawk River as it flows into the Hudson River creating a delta in the US state of New York. Most of the sprouts lie within Albany County, with the northern ones in Saratoga County, and the sprouts enter the Hudson at the boundary with Rensselaer County. The islands formed by the sprouts are, from north to south–Peebles Island, Polrump Island, Bock Island, Goat Island, Second Island, Van Schaick Island, Simmons Island. and formerly Green Island. The sprout separating Green Island from the rest of Albany County was filled in with the creation of Interstate 787 and NY Route 787.

== History ==
Henry Hudson's crew may have reached as far as the sprouts in 1609 when Hudson sent a small boat with his first mate and four crew members from Half Moon up the Hudson River to see if the river was indeed the Northwest Passage. The islands and sprouts (spuyten in Dutch) along with land along the northern shore of the northern sprouts was part of a tract of land deeded to Philip Pieterse Schuyler and Gozen Gerritse Van Schaick in 1665. The Native Americans called the area Nach-te-Nack, and by the Dutch settlers Halve-Maen (translated as Halfmoon in English). In 1674 Schuyler gave up his rights to the land to Van Schaick, and in 1687 Van Schaick's son Anthony Van Schaick was confirmed sole owner through patent title by Governor Thomas Dongan.

Portions of the sprouts were very shallow, 2 feet (0.61 m) or less, and allowed for easy fording of the river. Waterford received its name from the ford connecting the village to Peebles Island, a name which became popular through use by soldiers in the US Revolutionary War. The fords connecting the islands were used by the local Native Americans, the Mohicans and by the Dutch and English at Fort Orange and Albany en route to Montreal and Canada, being used by soldiers in the French and Indian Wars. During the American Revolutionary War the islands were the site of military fortifications protecting the fords and river road leading to Albany from invasion forces coming from Canada. Numerous fortifications were constructed on Peebles and Van Schaick Island, with the Van Schaick House being the military headquarters.

The Rensselaer and Saratoga Railroad (incorporated 1832) crossed onto Green Island from Troy over the Hudson River and then traveled north over three of the sprouts, crossing into Saratoga County.

In 1828 the King's Power Canal was constructed with two dams thrown across the Fourth Branch, between Waterford and Bock Island and then between Bock and Peebles.

The state dam between Cohoes and Waterford, located where the sprouts exit from the main channel of the Mohawk River, was rebuilt 12 feet (3.7 m) east (downstream) of the old dam in 1868. Both the original and the new dam were for the original path of the Champlain Canal, allowing the canal boats to cross the Mohawk River to the canal channel on the other side in place of using an aqueduct bridge over the river. The original dam was too low and boats often went over the edge, the newer dam being 15 inches (380 mm) taller was to cut down on that problem.

== Sprouts ==
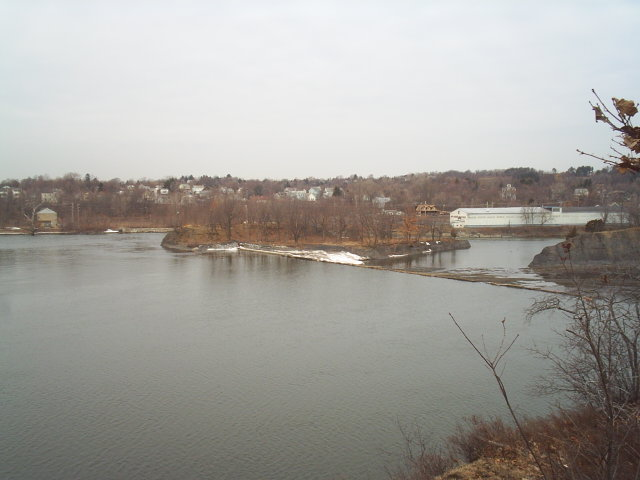
Fourth, or North, Branch of the Mohawk River surrounding Bock Island

Throughout the years the individual sprouts have been given different names. From north to south the sprouts are the–Fourth Branch, dividing Peebles Island from the mainland of Saratoga County; the Third Branch, separating Peebles from Van Schaick; the First Branch separating Van Schaick and Green islands from the mainland of Albany County; and the Second Branch, separating Van Schaick from Green Island. The Fourth Branch is also known as the North Sprout; and the Third Branch as the Middle Branch, which is the location of a rapid called Buttermilk Falls. The Middle Branch or sprout was also referred to as the White Sprout by the New York State Assembly in 1833. The name Fourth Branch is still used in reference to the hydroelectric power plant located in the town of Waterford. The center of the Third Branch is the political boundary between Saratoga and Albany counties while the Second Branch is the boundary between the city of Cohoes and the town/village of Green Island.

== Islands ==
- Green Island–Prior to being stripped of its status as an island, Green Island was the largest of the islands formed by the sprouts. Green Island was separated from Watervliet, Colonie and Cohoes mainlands by the First Branch and from Van Schaick Island by the Second Branch, with the Hudson River separating the island from Troy. The island is a part of the village and town of the same name.
- Van Schaick Island–A large and heavily populated island with the historic Van Schaick House, a country club, the historic Matton Shipyard, marinas, an elementary school. The island is separated from the mainland of Cohoes and Simmons Island by the First Branch, from Peebles Island by the Third Branch, Green Island by the Second Branch, and from Troy by the Hudson River. Politically a part of the city of Cohoes.
- Simmons Island–a small island in the middle of the First Branch with Van Schaick to the east and the mainland of Cohoes to the west. Politically a part of the city of Cohoes.
- Peebles Island–At 132 acres (53 ha) the largest of the islands formed by the sprouts that are in the town of Waterford and Saratoga County. It is part of the Peebles Island State Park and home to the New York State Office of Parks, Recreation, and Historic Preservation.
- Second Island–Second largest, after Peebles, of the islands that are in Waterford, and once was called King's Island. The island is the home to a Boy Scouts of America camp, Camp Kavanaugh.
- Goat Island–situated in the middle of the Fourth Branch and is owned by the state of New York.
- Bock Island–the site of two dams, one on each side connecting it to the Saratoga County mainland and to Peebles Island. Situated in the middle of the Fourth Branch and owned by Mohawk Paper. The island is 1.38 acres (0.56 ha) in size.
- Polrump Island–situated in the middle of the Fourth Branch and is owned by the state of New York.

== Recreation ==
Peebles Island is part of the Peebles Island State Park, an undeveloped park with recreational hiking paths and remnants of historical battleworks thrown up during the US Revolutionary War. The New York State Office of Parks, Recreation and Historic Preservation headquarters is located on the island. There is a public fishing site on the northern end of Simmons Island, and Peebles Island has shoreline fishing spots and areas where the river can be safely waded in. All fishing in the sprouts is catch and release due to the presence of PCB. A former railroad bridge over the Second Branch, variously referred to as the Black, Delaware, or Cohoes–Green Island bridge was renovated as part of a bike/hike trail connecting the cities and villages of Watervliet, Green Island, Cohoes, and Waterford. A visitor center with public docks are on the northern shore of the Fourth Branch in the village of Waterford.

There are designated swimming areas and there are individuals who enjoy river surfing.

== See also ==
- List of rivers of New York
