= New York State Route 470 =

State highway in the Capital District of New York, US

New York State Route 470
- Map of the Capital District with NY 470 highlighted in red

Route information
- Maintained by the cities of Cohoes and Troy
- Length: 2.91 mi (4.68 km)
- Existed: February–March 1973–present

Major junctions
- West end: NY 9R in Colonie
- NY 787 in Cohoes
- East end: US 4 in Troy

Location
- Country: United States
- State: New York
- Counties: Albany, Rensselaer

Highway system
- New York Highways; Interstate; US; State; Reference; Parkways
← NY 458	→ NY 474

New York State Route 470 (NY 470) is an east–west state highway in the Capital District of New York in the United States. It extends for 2.91 miles (4.68 km) from an intersection with NY 9R in the town of Colonie to a junction with U.S. Route 4 (US 4) in the city of Troy. Along the way, NY 470 intersects NY 787 in Cohoes and traverses the Hudson River via the 112th Street Bridge. NY 470 was assigned in February–March 1973 and is maintained by the cities of Cohoes and Troy.

== Route description ==
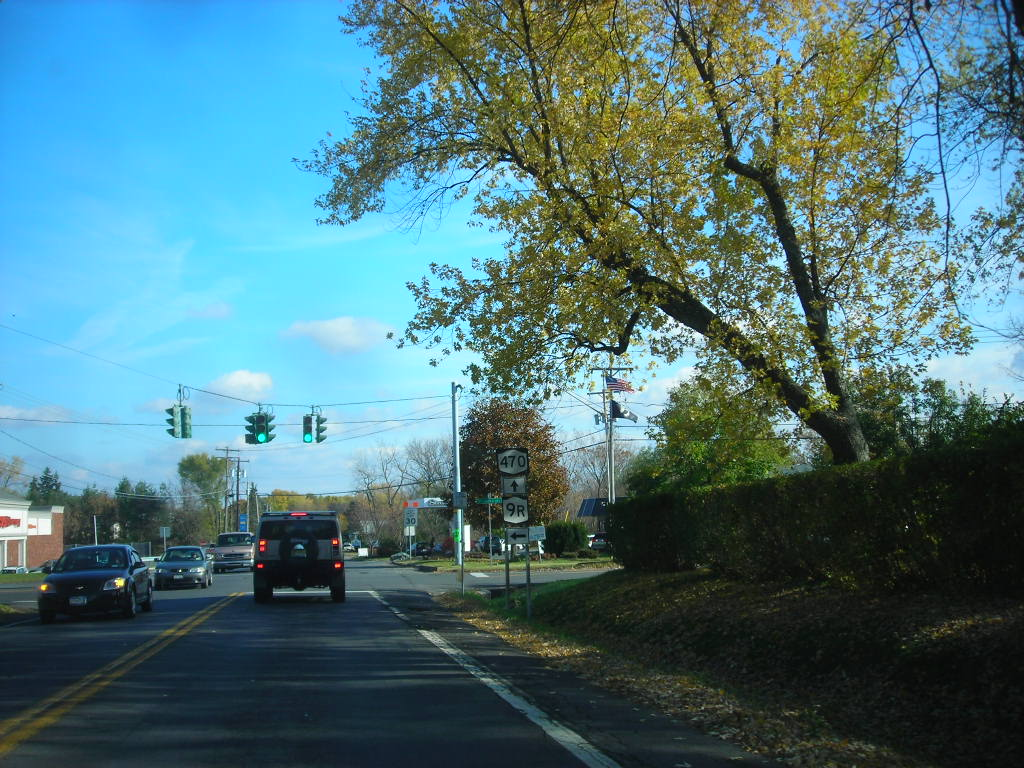
Western terminus of NY 470 at NY 9R

NY 470 begins at an intersection with NY 9R just west of the Cohoes city limits in the Albany County town of Colonie. NY 9R, known as Columbia Street west of this point, turns north to follow Baker Avenue while NY 470 heads east on the two-lane Columbia Street into Cohoes. As the route heads through suburban Cohoes, it passes within view of Cohoes High School and directly serves Cohoes Middle School before passing under an abandoned railroad line. At the first intersection east of the overpass, NY 470 turns north to parallel the old line along Bedford Street. Four blocks later, Bedford Street turns eastward, becoming Ontario Street at the midpoint of the curve. Here, the surroundings become more commercial as the route heads toward the city's historic downtown.

In downtown Cohoes, NY 470 crosses the Delaware and Hudson Railway and intersects NY 32 (Saratoga Street) in quick succession ahead of a junction with NY 787 on the banks of the First Branch of the Mohawk River. Past NY 787, NY 470 crosses a pair of bridges; first to reach Simmons Island, then to access the larger Van Schaick Island. NY 470 heads east across both of the densely populated islands and over the Hudson River via the 112th Street Bridge into the Lansingburgh neighborhood of Troy, in Rensselaer County. Within Troy, the route continues for one block as 112th Street before terminating at US 4 (Second Avenue).

== History ==
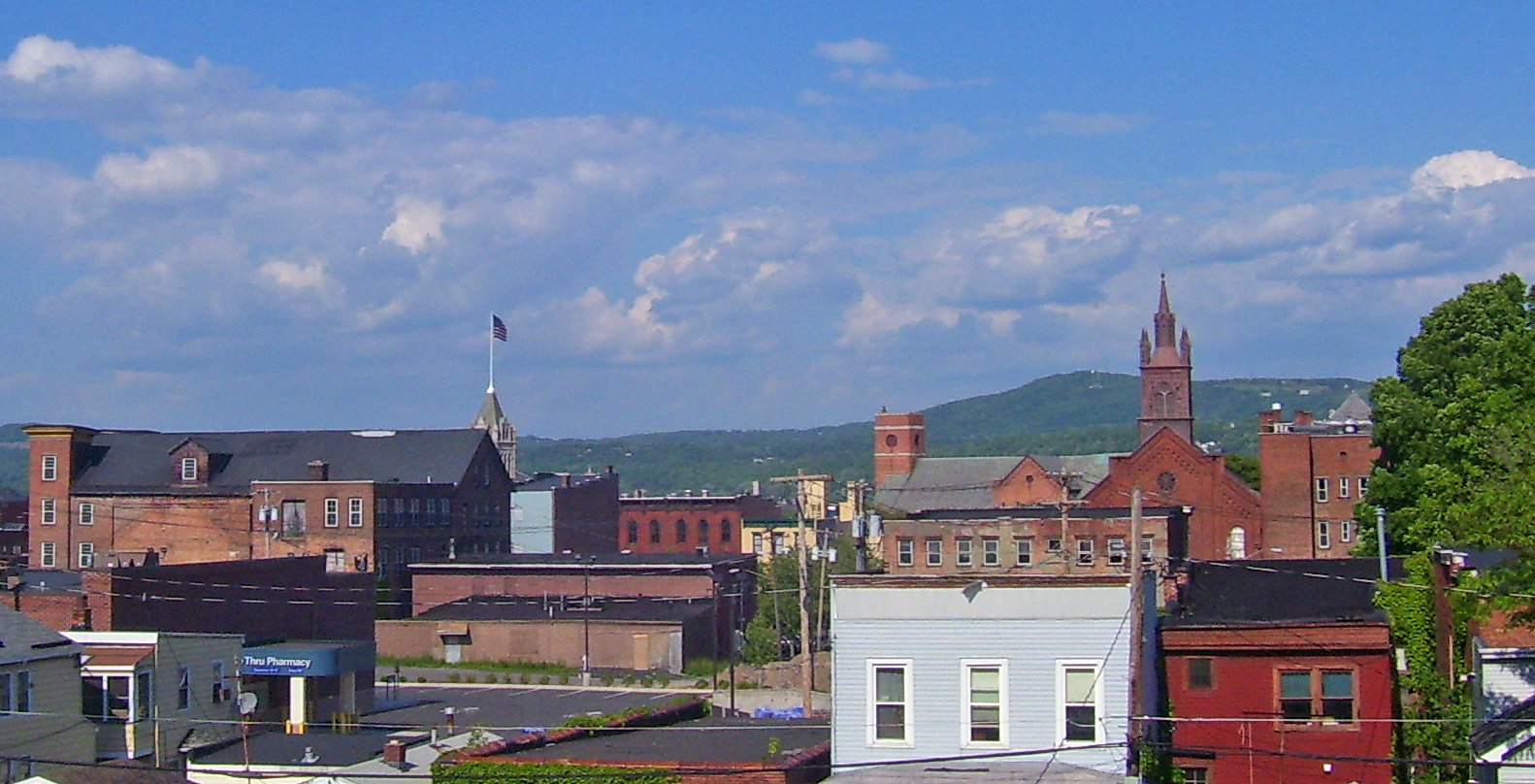
Downtown Cohoes as seen from the west on NY 470

When NY 470 was originally assigned in February–March 1973, it extended from the current southern terminus of NY 9R east through Cohoes to Troy. NY 9R, which had been intact prior to the assignment of NY 470, was removed. The NY 9R designation was reinstated in the late 1970s, reducing NY 470 to its present length. Although NY 470 is signed as a state highway, none of the route is maintained by the New York State Department of Transportation. Instead, maintenance of NY 470 is handled by the cities of Cohoes and Troy.

== Major intersections ==
County	Location	mi	km	Destinations	Notes
Albany	Cohoes	0.00	0.00	NY 9R (Baker Avenue / Columbia Street Extension)	Western terminus
Albany	Cohoes	1.9	3.1	NY 32 (Saratoga Street)	
Albany	Cohoes	1.96	3.15	NY 787 (Cohoes Boulevard) to I-787 south	
Hudson River		2.76	4.44	Bridge	
Rensselaer	Troy	2.91	4.68	US 4 (Second Avenue) / 112th Street east	Continues east without designation
1.000 mi = 1.609 km; 1.000 km = 0.621 mi
