= Van Schaick =

Van Schaick or Schaick is a Dutch toponymic surname (see Van Schaik for the origin of the name). It primarily occurs in the United States and most are descendants of Goosen Gerritse van Schaick (1633–1676), born in Westbroek and a brewer in Beverwijck/Albany, New York, who bought the island eventually known as Van Schaick Island. People with this name include:

- Goose Van Schaick (1736–1789), Continental Army general during the Revolutionary War
- Isaac W. Van Schaick (1817–1901), U.S. Representative from Wisconsin
- John van Schaick Jr. (1873–1949), Universalist Church of America minister
- Louis J. Van Schaick (1875–1945), U.S. Army lieutenant, Medal of Honor recipient for actions in the Philippine-American War
- Myndert Van Schaick (1782–1865), New York politician
- Steven A. Schaick (born 1958), U.S. Air Force Chief of Chaplains
- William H. Van Schaick (1837–1927), captain of the steamboat General Slocum

Used as a middle name:

- Aaron Van Schaick Cochrane (1858–1943), U.S. Congressman from New York
- Anna Van Schaick Mitchell (1878–1966), American Red Cross worker in France during World War I
- John Van Schaick Lansing Pruyn (1811–1877), U.S. Representative from New York

== See also ==
- Van Schaick House, historic home located on Van Schaick Island
- Van Schaick Island, island in Cohoes, New York
- Van Schaick and Company, mid-sized investment company on the U.S. East Coast, 1857–1911
- Van Schaik
