= Day Peckinpaugh =

Motorship on the Erie Canal, New York, USA

- U.S. National Register of Historic Places
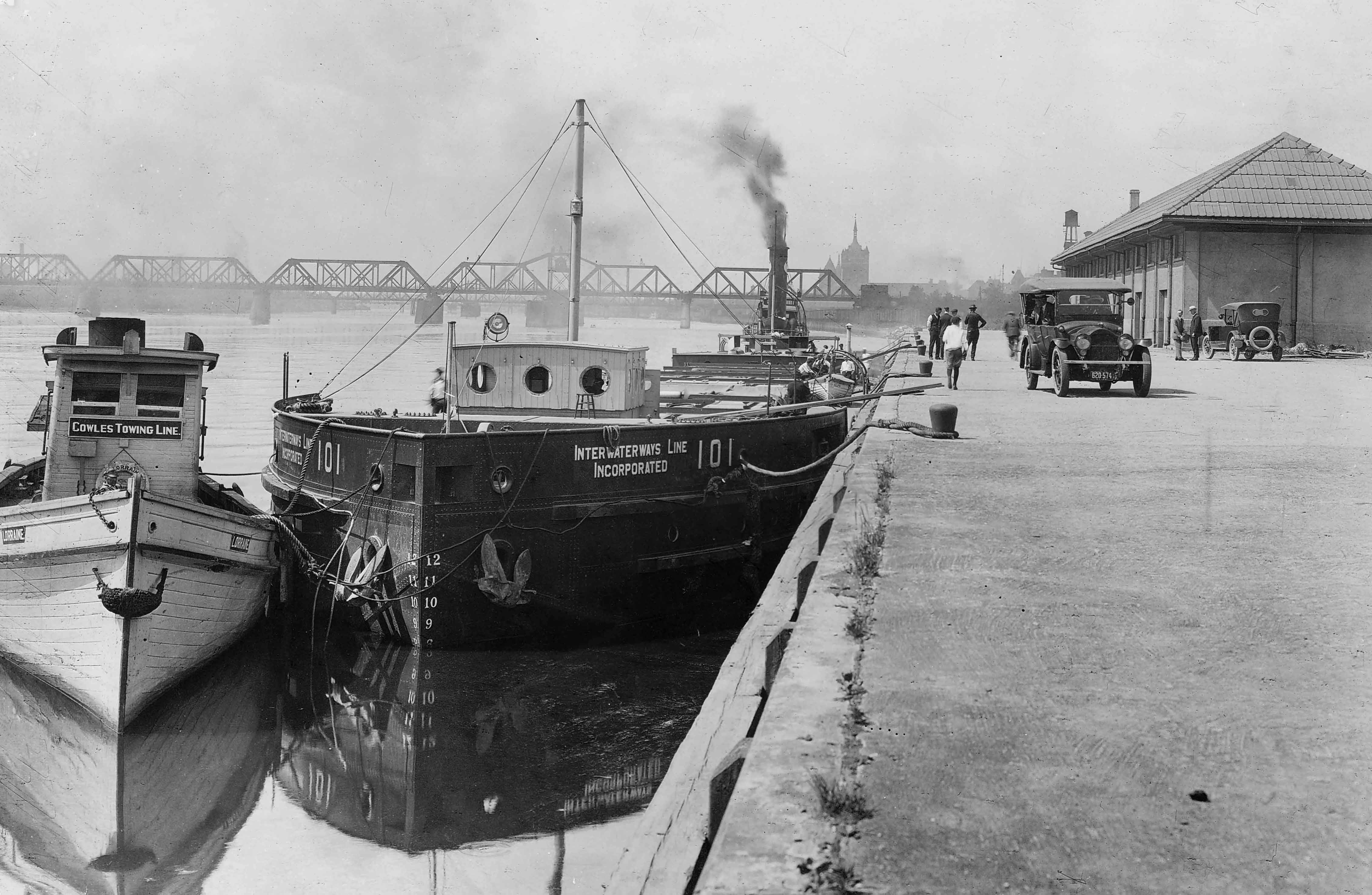
- Day Peckinpaugh docked at Albany on her maiden voyage in 1921

- Location within New York Location within the United States
- Location: Matton Shipyard, Van Schaick Island, Cohoes, New York
- Coordinates: 42°46′43″N 73°40′48″W
- Built: 1921
- Architect: McDougal-Duluth, MN, builder; Todd Shipyard, Brooklyn, NY, rebuild
- Architectural style: canal motorship
- NRHP reference No.: 05001486
- Added to NRHP: December 28, 2005

Day Peckinpaugh is a historic canal motorship berthed at the Matton Shipyard on Peebles Island, Cohoes in Albany County, New York, United States.

== Early years ==
Day Peckinpaugh was built in 1921 by the McDougall-Duluth Shipyard in Duluth, Minnesota, the first boat specially designed and built for New York State Barge Canal, the successor to the famed Erie Canal. The ship was originally named ILI101 after the ship's first owner, the Interwaterways Lines Inc of New York City. The ship was the first specifically designed to ply the open waters of the Great Lakes as well as the narrow locks and shallow waterways of the barge canal. Day Peckinpaugh is also the last surviving ship from a fleet of more than 100 of her type that once carried freight from the upper Midwest to the port of New York City.

At a length of 259 feet (79 m) and width of 36 feet (11 m), she is among the largest boats to operate on New York's canal system where the maximum area available for vessels in a lock is 300 feet (91 m) long by 43.5 feet (13.3 m) wide. With a 14-foot-deep (4.3 m) hold and a carrying capacity of 1,650 tonnes (1,620 long tons; 1,820 short tons), Day Peckinpaugh was well suited as a bulk carrier in which she hauled wheat, flax seed, rye, sugar, and in the early years pig iron.

== First renaming ==
ILI101 was rechristened Richard J. Barnes in 1922 to honor the man who originally commissioned the ship.

== World War II service ==
During World War II, Richard J. Barnes was drafted into the US Merchant Marine to carry coal and refuel cargo ships along the east coast of the United States. During her Merchant Marine service Richard J. Barnes was attacked by a German U-boat which fired a torpedo at her; the torpedo was thought to have passed under the ship due to her shallow seven foot draft.

== Second renaming ==
In 1958, the ship was sold to Erie Navigation and retrofitted to carry sand and gravel. The ship was again renamed, becoming Day Peckinpaugh, in honor of the man of the same name, brother of the New York Yankees player and manager, Roger Peckinpaugh.

== Later service ==
The ship was converted to a self-unloading dry cement hauler in 1961 and used to carry cement from Oswego to Rome, New York until her retirement in 1994. Day Peckinpaugh was the last self-propelled regularly scheduled commercial hauler on the barge canal.

== Restoration ==
In 2005 Day Peckinpaugh was saved from the scrap yard by a partnership of museums and canal preservation societies, and is undergoing extensive cleaning, painting, restoration and testing of her engines. More than $3 million has been pledged to restore and convert Day Peckinpaugh into a floating classroom and museum that will highlight the history and heritage of the Erie Canal and the Great Lakes. In late 2011 the New York State Department of Education received a $191,000 grant to outfit Day Peckinpaugh to serve as a multi-regional educational facility. The restoration was scheduled for completion in 2012. The Day Peckinpaugh is the largest artifact in the New York State Museum collection.

== Attempted sinking ==
On March 8, 2010, Guy J. Pucci, a 35-year-old ex-state employee was arrested after almost completely sinking the ship while she was docked at Lock 2 of the Barge Canal undergoing restoration. Pucci went aboard the vessel and opened valves to flood the ship in an attempt to scuttle her. State Police said that Day Peckinpaugh was close to being submerged as police and ship employees worked to pump the water from the ship's engine rooms. The ship sustained extensive damage due to the flooding, and repairs were estimated to be in excess of $10,000.

Pucci had worked aboard Day Peckinpaugh since July 2009, but his position as a maintenance assistant had been terminated February 25, 2010. On September 15, 2010, Pucci was sentenced to time served and five years' probation, including drug treatment court, after pleading guilty to a felony third-degree criminal mischief charge.

== Current status ==
The ship was listed on the National Register of Historic Places in 2005. At the time of its listing, it was located at Lockport in Niagara County, New York, but its home base between trips and for maintenance is in Cohoes.

Day Peckinpaugh and the 1901 tugboat Urger, as still-functioning vessels, have become movable ambassadors of the New York State Barge Canal System.

As of 2018 it was considered a possible candidate for sinking as a reef due to maintenance costs.

In October 2024 the Day Peckinpaugh was sold at auction by the New York State Education Department. They were the then owners but could no longer afford the $20,000.00 to $30,000.00 a year cost to just keep the Day Peckinpaugh from sinking. Pumps running constantly were keeping the boat afloat. The minimum bid level was $5,000.00. The Peckinpaugh highest bid was just $50.00. It sold for $5,050.00 to Capt. Dwayne Reith, owner of Custom Marine, a marine salvage company.

== Gallery ==
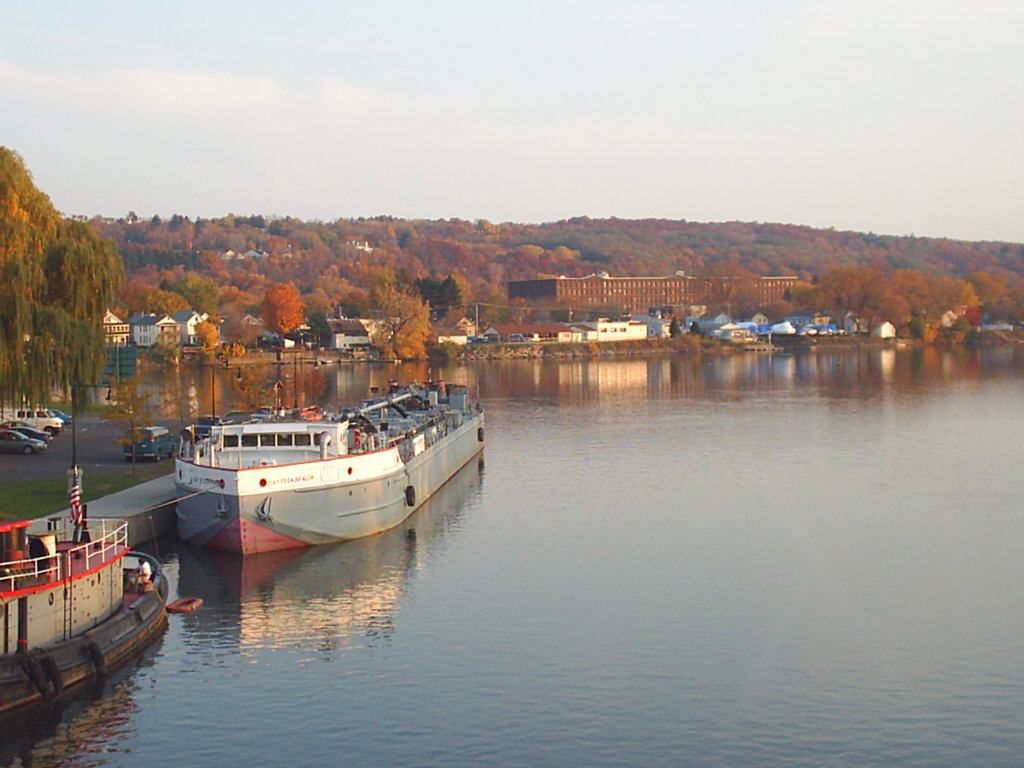
Day Peckinpaugh docked at Waterford, New York (November 2005)

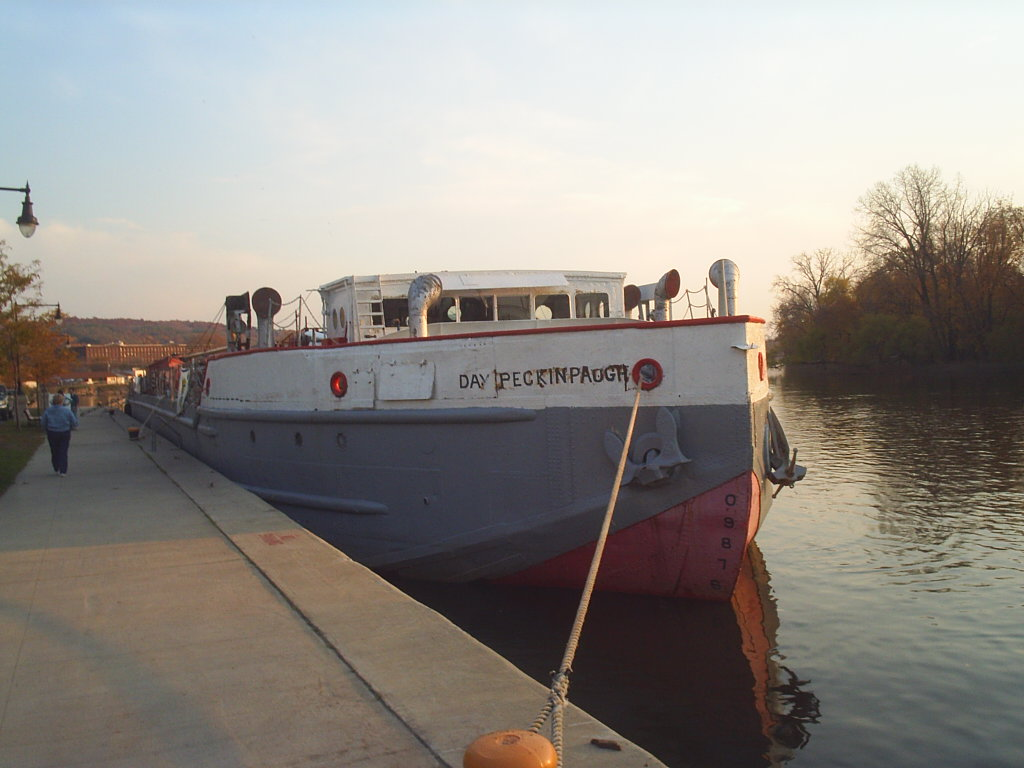
Day Peckinpaugh closeup at Waterford, New York (November 2005)

== Other websites ==
Media related to Day Peckinpaugh (ship, 1921) at Wikimedia Commons
