= John Barclay (New Jersey politician) =

American politician

Member of the New Jersey General Assembly from the Town of Perth Amboy district
- In office 1704–1706 Serving with Thomas Gordon
- Preceded by: Miles Forster
- Succeeded by: John Harrison

Personal details
- Born: c. 1650 Scotland
- Died: April 29, 1731 (aged 80–81) Perth Amboy, Province of East Jersey
- Relations: Andrew Barclay (grandson); Sir Robert Gordon, 1st Baronet (grandfather)
- Children: John Barclay
- Parent(s): David Barclay; Lady Katherine Gordon
- Occupation: Politician

John Barclay (c. 1650 – April 29, 1731) was a Scottish Quaker, younger brother of Robert Barclay and a member of Clan Barclay. He held several government positions the East Jersey colony in North America and was a member of the New Jersey General Assembly from 1704 to 1706.

== Early life ==
Coat of Arms of John Barclay

Barclay was probably born at Gordonstoun in Moray, Scotland like his elder brother. He was the second son of Col. David Barclay of Urie (1580–1660) and Lady Katherine (née Gordon) Barclay (1620–1663). His father had served under Gustavus Adolphus of Sweden, and pursued a somewhat tortuous course through the troubles of the English civil war, and his maternal grandfather was Sir Robert Gordon, 1st Baronet of Gordonstoun.

== Career ==
Barclay is believed to have first arrived in East New Jersey about 1682, but returned to Great Britain in 1683 bearing correspondence to the Proprietors from Deputy Governor Thomas Rudyard and Surveyor General Samuel Groom.

He returned to East Jersey in 1684 or 1685, residing in Elizabethtown and Plainfield before settling in Perth Amboy in 1688.

=== Political career ===
In January 1688–89, Barclay was appointed Deputy Surveyor General under George Keith. He received the appointment on April 6, 1692, to succeed Keith in office, along with the position of Receiver General. He took the oath of office the following November 1.

In 1692 and 1693, John Barclay served in the East New Jersey General Assembly, representing the Town of Perth Amboy. On November 25, 1695, Barclay was appointed Deputy Provincial Secretary and Register, succeeding Thomas Gordon, who had returned to Great Britain. On August 6, 1698, he was appointed Register of the Court of Chancery and as a Commissioner of the Court of Small Causes. He returned to the Legislature in 1698 and 1699, this time representing Middlesex County.

In 1700, Barclay was appointed Clerk of the Court of Common Right, Clerk of the Supreme Court and Clerk of the Court of Sessions.

After the late 1690s the government of East and West Jersey became increasingly dysfunctional. This ultimately resulted in the surrender by the Proprietors of East Jersey and those of West Jersey of the right of government to Queen Anne. Anne's government united the two colonies as the Province of New Jersey, a royal colony, establishing a new system of government. This reorganization and the period leading up to it saw many New Jersey politicians jockeying for power and influence in the new government.

After the unification of the Jerseys, John Barclay represented the Town of Perth Amboy constituency in the New Jersey General Assembly from 1704 to 1706. While in the Assembly, he was one of the legislators who incurred the wrath of Governor Viscount Cornbury. A specific issue between Barclay and Cornbury was the removal of Proprietary records from the hands of Barclay and Thomas Gordon to the custody of Peter Sonmans. This dispute culminated in Sonmans having Barclay arrested one Sunday while exiting his church.

== Personal life ==
Barclay was married to Katherine Rescarrick (c. 1661–1703). Together, they were the parents of two sons:

- Rev. Thomas Barclay, who married Anna Dorothea Drauyer, a daughter of Admiral Andries Drauyer of the Dutch Navy and granddaughter of Levinius Van Schaick.
- John Barclay (c. 1702–1786), who married Katharine Gordon, daughter of Charles Gordon, on June 11, 1725. After Katharine's death in 1757, with whom he had eleven children, he remarried to Jane Van Dyke in 1763.

John Barclay's later years were spent in Perth Amboy in East New Jersey, where he died on April 29, 1731.

=== Descendants ===
Through his son Thomas, he was a grandfather of New York merchant Andrew Barclay (1719–1775).

== Ancestry ==
Ancestors of John Barclay (New Jersey politician)

16. George Barclay (1536-1607), 9th of Mathers
8. Thomas Barclay (1558-1607), 10th of Mathers
17. Mary Erskine (1537-1575)
4. David Barclay (1580-1660), 11th of Mathers
18. -- Straiton
9. Janet Straiton
19. unknown
2. Colonel David Barclay (1610-86)
20. John Livingstone (-1598)
10. John Livinstone (1553-1620), of Dunipace
21. Margaret, daughter of Alexander, 2nd Lord Elphinstone (1510-46)
5. Elizabeth Livingstone (1582-1623)
22. Robert Colville (1532-84)
11. Magaret Colville (1563-1623)
23. Frances, daughter of Patrick Colquhoun of Luss (1484-1513)
1. John Barclay (c1650-1731)
24. John Gordon, 11th Earl of Sutherland (1525-67)
12. Alexander Gordon, 12th Earl of Sutherland (c1552–1594)
25. Helenor Stewart, daughter of John Stewart, 3rd Earl of Lennox (1490-1526)
6. Sir Robert Gordon of Gordonstoun (1580-1656)
26. George Gordon, 4th Earl of Huntly (1514-62)
13. Jean Gordon, Countess of Bothwell (1546-1629)
27. Elizabeth Keith
3. Katherine Gordon (1621-83)
28. Alexander Gordon, Archbishop of Glasgow (c1516-75)
14. John Gordon, Bishop of Galloway (1544-1619)
29. Barbara Logie
7. Louise Gordon (1597-1680)
30. François Pétau, sieur de Maulette (-1584)
15. Geneviève Pétau de Maulette (c1560-1643)
31. Isabelle, daughter of Jean Barthomier, sieur d'Olivet
