= New York State Route 9R =

State highway in Albany County, New York, US

New York State Route 9R
- Map of Albany County in eastern New York with NY 9R highlighted in red

Route information
- Auxiliary route of US 9
- Maintained by NYSDOT
- Length: 3.22 mi (5.18 km)
- Existed: c. 1939–present

Major junctions
- South end: I-87 / US 9 / NY 7 in Latham
- North end: US 9 in Boght Corners

Location
- Country: United States
- State: New York
- Counties: Albany

Highway system
- New York Highways; Interstate; US; State; Reference; Parkways
← NY 9P	→ US 9W

New York State Route 9R (NY 9R) is a north–south state highway in northeastern Albany County, New York, in the United States. The route is a 3.22-mile (5.18 km) eastern loop of U.S. Route 9 (US 9), connecting that route to the city of Cohoes 1.5 miles (2.4 km) to the east. It leaves US 9 in the hamlet of Latham and rejoins its parent in the hamlet of Boght Corners, both located in the town of Colonie. Most of NY 9R is a two-lane highway that passes through residential areas; however, the southwesternmost portion of the route is four lanes wide and serves a commercial district. The route was assigned c. 1939 and has remained largely unchanged since that time, save for a brief period during the 1970s where NY 9R was partially replaced by NY 470.

== Route description ==
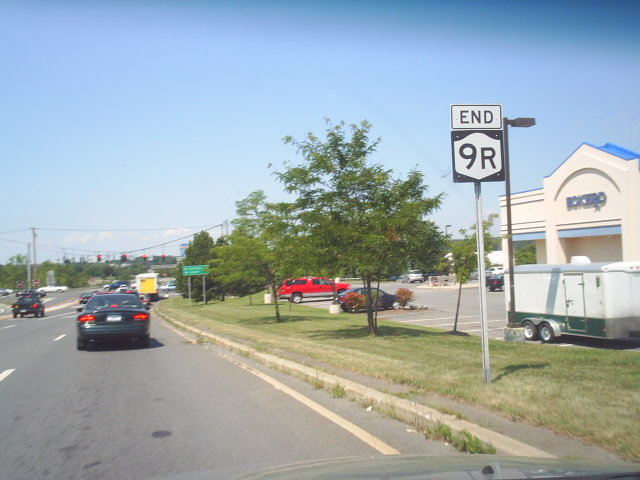
Southern terminus of NY 9R

NY 9R begins opposite the entrance to the on-ramp for Interstate 87 (I-87) exit 7 at an intersection with US 9 (Loudon Road) in the Colonie hamlet of Latham, located north of the city of Albany. The junction is also the termination of the off-ramp from the limited-access NY 7 west onto US 9. NY 9R heads east as the four-lane Columbia Street Extension, initially passing through a commercialized area centered around the route's intersections with US 9 and the nearby Old Loudon Road. The commercial strip ends at Johnson Road, where the route turns northeastward and narrows to two lanes as it heads into a lightly populated area of Colonie. This section of Columbia Street Extension passes by some commercial buildings; however, most of the development along the highway is residential, with most of the homes located in cul-de-sacs leading away from NY 9R.

Roughly 0.5 miles (0.8 km) west of an intersection with NY 470 on the western edge of the city of Cohoes, the area surrounding the highway changes drastically as the route becomes lined with residential dwellings. The string of homes continue to the junction with NY 470 on the Cohoes city line, where NY 9R turns north onto Baker Avenue, a two-lane street that runs along the border between the town of Colonie and the city of Cohoes. Columbia Street, meanwhile, continues east into downtown Cohoes as NY 470, which begins at NY 9R. Heading north, NY 9R passes through both residential neighborhoods and lightly populated areas. The homes along the Colonie (west) side of the route give way to woods after just 0.3 miles (0.5 km); however, the Cohoes (east) side remains lined with fully populated and developed neighborhoods for another 0.7 miles (1.1 km).

The 1-mile (1.6 km) north–south stretch ends at a junction with Boght Road, known as Manor Avenue within Cohoes. Both highways sit on the northern boundary of what was once the Manor of Rensselaerswyck. NY 9R turns left at this intersection, leaving the city boundary and proceeding westward along Boght Road. The complexion of the roadway is similar to that of the first 0.3 miles of Baker Avenue, as the two-lane road is lined with a steady stream of houses. After 0.75 miles (1.21 km), NY 9R enters a lightly populated hamlet named Boght Corners, where it ends at an intersection with US 9. While the state route ends here, Boght Road continues westward as a town road to Dunsbach Ferry Road, a north–south town highway paralleling I-87 through northern Colonie.

== History ==
NY 9R was assigned c. 1939 to most of its current alignment. Originally, the southern half of the route followed Johnson Road and St. Agnes Highway through Colonie; however, it was realigned in the early 1940s to follow an extension of Columbia Street between US 9 and the Cohoes city line. In the mid-1970s, NY 9R was removed and partially replaced with the new NY 470, an east–west route extending from the current southern terminus of NY 9R east through Cohoes to Troy. The NY 9R designation was reinstated in the late 1970s, resulting in the truncation of NY 470 to its present length.

== Major intersections ==
The entire route is in Albany County.

Location	mi	km	Destinations	Notes
Town of Colonie	0.00	0.00	I-87 / NY 7 / US 9 – Albany, Schenectady, Saratoga Springs, Glens Falls	Southern terminus; exit 7 on I-87
Colonie–Cohoes line	1.54	2.48	NY 470 east (Columbia Street)	Western terminus of NY 470
Town of Colonie	3.22	5.18	US 9 (Loudon Road)	Northern terminus; hamlet of Boght Corners
1.000 mi = 1.609 km; 1.000 km = 0.621 mi
