= Theresa V. Brassard =

American metallographer

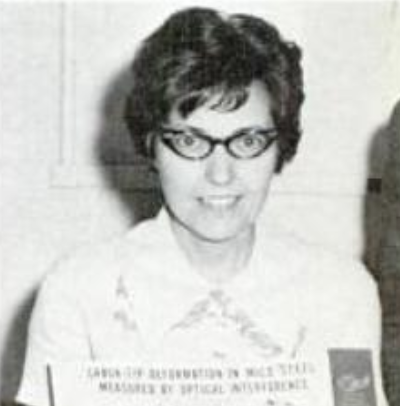
- Theresa V. Brassard, from a 1976 publication of the United States Army
- Born: Theresa Vandecar; January 3, 1929; Cohoes, New York
- Died: May 17, 2016
- Occupation: Metallographer

Theresa Mary Vandecar Brassard (January 3, 1929 – May 17, 2016) was an American metallographer.

== Early life ==
Theresa Vandecar was from Cohoes, New York, the daughter of Orville Vandecar and Bertha M. Peat Vandecar. She graduated from Cohoes High School in 1947.

== Career ==
Brassard worked as a metallographic technician at Allegheny Ludlum Steel Corporation, and at General Electric in Schenectady, New York. In 1967, she joined the staff of the Army's Physical and Mechanical Metallurgy Laboratory, Maggs Research Laboratory at Watervliet Arsenal in New York. At Watervliet, she was director of the metallography laboratory, and used metallographic analysis to study "white layer", an erosion phenomenon that affected gunmetal.

Brassard's photomicrographs were exhibited nationally and won awards from the American Ceramic Society and the American Society for Testing Materials (ASTM). In 1975 she received the Metallurgical Engineering Assistant's Award from the Eastern New York chapter of the American Society of Metals. She was nominated for the Federal Woman's Award in 1975. From 1979 to 1981 she was membership secretary of the ASTM's Metallography committee. She published her research in academic journals including Composites and Metals Engineering Quarterly.

In 1983, Brassard moved to California, where she was a metallographer at Long Beach Naval Shipyard. She retired in 1988, and returned to New York state.

== Selected publications and reports ==
- "Sample Preparation and Evaluation of Steel Specimens for Inclusion Retention and Subsequent Automated Assessment" (1983)
- "How Microstructure Influences Mechanical Properties of Forgings" (1973, with Charles J. Nolan and Richard DeFries)
- "Some Observations on the Relationship between Microstructure and Mechanical Properties in Large Cylindrical Gun Tube Forgings" (1970, with Richard S. DeFries and Charles J. Nolan)
- "Crack-tip Deformation in Mild Steel: Measured by Optical Interference" (1970, with John H. Underwood)
- "Metallographic Technique for the Development of Microstructural Constituents in Gun Steel" (1970, with Charles J. Nolan)
- "Preparing Nickel/Boron and Other Composites for Optical-Metallographic Examinations" (1969)
- "Preparing Various Graphites for Metallographic Examination" (1962, with Andrew S. Holik)

== Personal life ==
Vandecar married World War II veteran Raymond Earl Brassard. They had three children. Her husband died in 1998, and she died in 2016, aged 87 years. Her gravesite is in Saratoga National Cemetery, with her husband's.
