= Van Schaik =

Van Schaik is a Dutch toponymic surname meaning "from/of Schaik". Variants include Van Schaaik, Van Schaick, Van Schaïk, Van Schaijk and Van Schayk. While the latter two forms usually refer to an origin in Schaijk in North Brabant, the more common forms have an origin in multiple (small) places in the Rhine delta named Schaik (etc.), Schadijk, or the original Schadewijk (possibly "shaded place"). People with the surname include:

- Andre van Schaik, Australian engineer
- Carel van Schaik (born 1953), Dutch primatologist
- Henri van Schaik (1899–1991), Dutch horse rider
- Jarad van Schaik (born 1988), American soccer player
- Josef van Schaik (1882–1962), Dutch politician, Minister of Justice and Deputy Prime Minister
- Max van Schaik (born 1991), Dutch basketball player
- Paulien van Schaik (born 1967), Dutch jazz singer
- Sam van Schaik (born 1972), English Tibetologist
- Steef van Schaik (1888–1968), Dutch politician, Minister of Infrastructure, brother of Josef
- Nicolai van Schaik (born 2002), Danish law student, musician

Van Schaaik

- Erik van Schaaik (born 1968), Dutch animator

Van Schaijk / Van Schayk

- Toer van Schayk (born 1936), Dutch ballet dancer, choreographer, and artist

== See also ==
- 17980 Vanschaik, main-belt asteroid named after a science fair winning graduate school student (Katherine Van Schaik)
- Van Schaick
