= Andrew Barclay (merchant) =

Scottish-American merchant

4th President of the Saint Andrew's Society of the State of New York
- In office 1759–1761
- Preceded by: John Morin Scott
- Succeeded by: William Alexander

Personal details
- Born: October 1719; Albany, Province of New York, British America
- Died: June 19, 1775 (aged 55)
- Spouse: Helena Roosevelt (m. 1737; died 1773)
- Relations: Thomas Henry Barclay (nephew)
- Children: 11
- Parent(s): Anna Dorothea Drauyer Barclay; Rev. Thomas Barclay

Andrew Barclay (October 1719 – June 19, 1775) was a Scottish-American merchant who served as the 4th president of the Saint Andrew's Society of the State of New York.

== Early life ==
Barclay was born in Albany in the Province of New York in British America in October 1719. He was the son of Anna Dorothea (née Drauyer) Barclay, a Dutch speaker, and the Rev. Thomas Barclay, a native of Scotland who became the first rector of St. Peter's Church in Albany, himself the son of East Jersey Governor John Barclay. Among his siblings was the Rev. William Henry Barclay, rector of Trinity Church in Manhattan who graduated from Yale College in 1734 and was the father of Thomas Henry Barclay.

Barclay, who was educated in Albany, was the maternal grandson of Gertrud (née Van Schaick) Drauyer (a daughter of Levinius Van Schaick) and Capt. Andries Drauyer, a Dane in the Dutch navy.

== Career ==
Following the death of his father in 1726, he was sent from Albany to New York City to learn business. Barclay married into the prominent Roosevelt family, which allied him to the Dutch families of the province, and he became a successful merchant. He owned a sugar house and works in conjunction with his brothers-in-law, Jacobus Roosevelt Jr. and Isaac Roosevelt.

From 1759 to 1761, he served as the fourth president of the Saint Andrew's Society of the State of New York, of which he was a founder in 1756. He had previously served as vice-president from 1758 to 1759.

== Personal life ==
Coat of Arms of Andrew Barclay

On June 14, 1737, Barclay was married to Helena Roosevelt (1719–1772), daughter of James Jacobus Roosevelt and Catharina Hardenbroek. Helena's paternal grandfather was Nicholas Roosevelt (the last common ancestor of the Oyster Bay Roosevelts and the Hyde Park Roosevelts). Together they lived at 45 Hanover Square and were the parents of eleven children:

- Thomas J. Barclay, who died unmarried.
- James Barclay (1750–1791), who married Maria van Beverhout.
- Andrew H. Barclay, who died young.
- Henry Barclay, who died unmarried.
- John Barclay, who married Catherine Barclay.
- Ann Dorothea Barclay (b. 1741), who married Theophylact Bache, brother of Benjamin Franklin's son-in-law, Post Master General Richard Bache.
- Catherine Barclay, who married Augustus Van Cortlandt.
- Sarah Ann Barclay (1745–1806), who married Anthony Lispenard, son of Leonard Lispenard.
- Ann Margaret Barclay, who married Frederick Jay.
- Helena Barclay (d. 1775), who married Maj. Thomas Moncrieff of the British Army.
- Charlotte Amelia Barclay (1760–1778), who married Dr. Richard Bayley, the first professor of anatomy at Columbia College.

His wife died in 1773, and Barclay died on June 19, 1775. In his 1763 will, he left his oldest son Thomas a special legacy of £100, in addition to the £600 he left to each living child.
