= 112th Street Bridge =

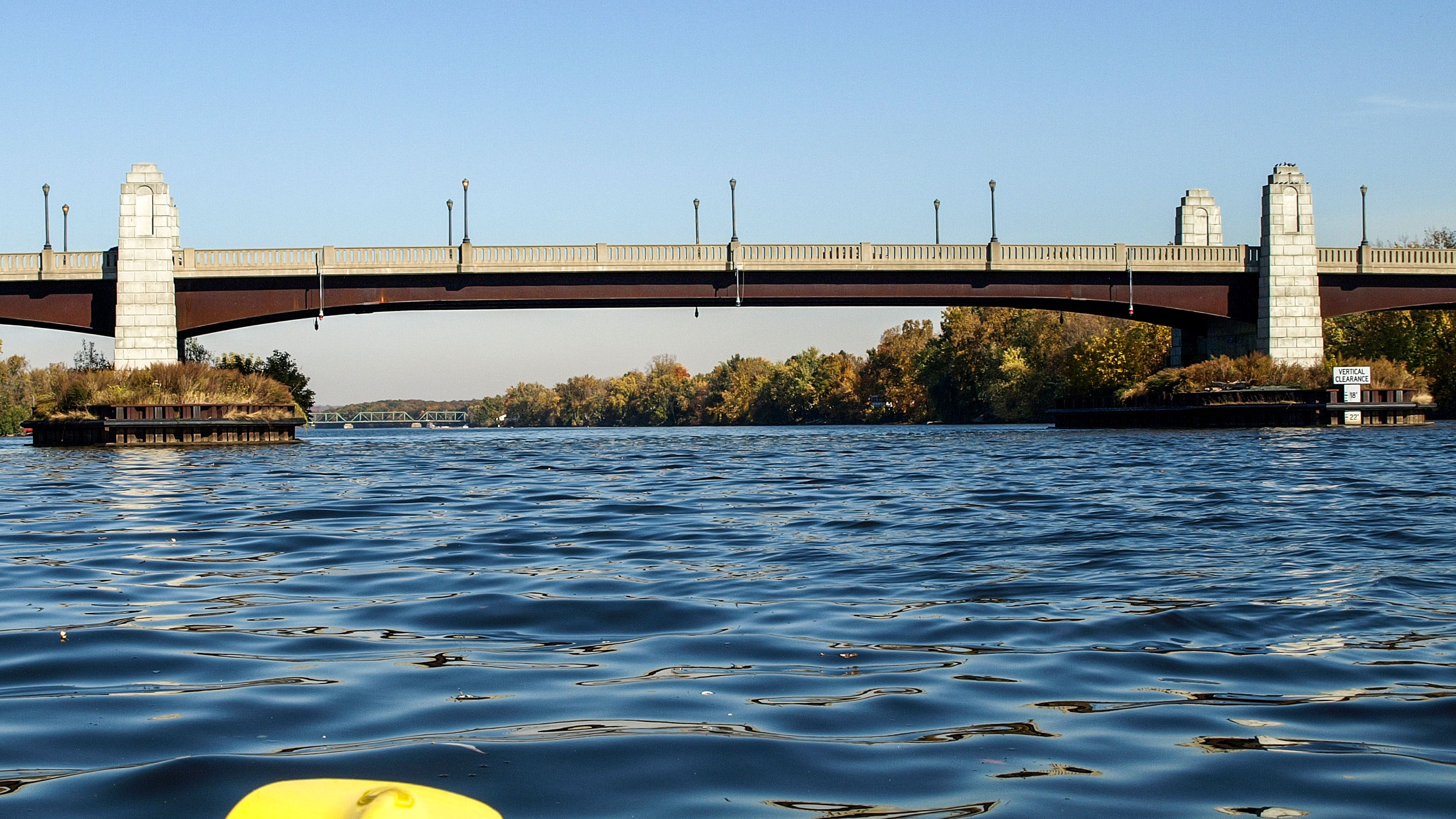
- Coordinates: 42.7717°N 73.6817°W
- Carries: NY 470
- Crosses: Hudson River
- Locale: Cohoes, Albany County, and Lansingburgh, Rensselaer County, both in New York, United States

History
- Opened: 1922 (1st); 1996 (2nd)
- Closed: 1995

The 112th Street Bridge is a bridge that carries New York State Route 470 across the Hudson River in New York. It connects Van Schaick Island in the city of Cohoes with the Lansingburgh neighborhood of Troy. The original bridge was built in 1922 and demolished in 1995. The newer version was completed in 1996.

== See also ==
- List of crossings of the Hudson River
