= Levinius Van Schaick =

Dutch-American merchant and politician

Levinius Van Schaick (c. 1661 – c. 1709) was a Dutch-American merchant and politician who served in the New York General Assembly.

== Early life ==
Van Schaick was born about 1661 into the prominent Van Schaick family. He was one of six children of New Netherland pioneers Goosen Gerritse Van Schaick (1633–1676) (a native of Utrecht who came to New Netherland in 1637 under contract with the Van Rensselaers) and, his second wife, Anna Lievens Van Schaick (c. 1630s–1702). His father was the namesake of Van Schaick Island, which was inherited by Levinius' elder half-brother, Anthony van Schaick (who built the Van Schaick Mansion). His sister, Anna Maria Van Schaick, married Johannes Van Cortlandt (son of Stephanus Van Cortlandt), and his niece, Gertrude Van Cortlandt, was the wife of Philip Verplanck. Another sister, Engeltie Van Schaick, was the first wife of Pieter Schuyler, and his niece, Margarita Schuyler, married Robert Livingston the Younger.

At the age of seven, he was named among the heirs of his parents' will filed in 1668. In the early 1680s, he was an Albany merchant and trader. In 1689, his name appeared on an assessment roll of Albany householders.

== Career ==
In 1686, he was appointed Alderman under the Albany city charter. He served as alderman and assessor for the first ward through 1692.

Van Schaick relocated to New York City, likely to serve in the provincial Assembly where he was elected first in 1691. However, shortly thereafter, he appears to have returned to Europe where he married and raised a family. In 1702, while identified as a merchant of Amsterdam, he transferred his bible to a young Johannes de Peyster III of New York. In Holland, he traded with Robert Livingston.

== Personal life ==
In February 1694, he married a widow named Anna, however, the marriage was short-lived and childless. In early 1695, he wed Anna Groenwout in Amsterdam. At least eight children were christened in Holland between 1695 and 1708, the last, a child name also Levinius, was christened in December 1708.

Among his grandchildren, were Anna Dorothea Drauyer (daughter of Gerritje "Gertrude" Van Schaick and Admiral Andries Drauyer of the Dutch Navy), who married Rev. Thomas Barclay and was the mother of merchant Andrew Barclay.
