= South Mall Arterial =

Expressway in New York, United States

- South Mall Arterial highlighted in red

Route information
- Maintained by NYSDOT
- Length: 0.52 mi (840 m)
- Existed: early 1960s–present

Major junctions
- West end: South Swan Street in Albany
- East end: I-787 / US 9 / US 20 in Albany

Location
- Country: United States
- State: New York

Highway system
- New York Highways; Interstate; US; State; Reference; Parkways

The South Mall Arterial is a short freeway in Albany, New York, in the United States. It begins at an intersection with Swan Street and runs eastward under the Empire State Plaza to the west end of the Dunn Memorial Bridge, where the highway ends at an interchange between Interstate 787 (I-787), U.S. Route 9 (US 9), and US 20. The road is maintained by the New York State Department of Transportation (NYSDOT) as New York State Route 913V (NY 913V), an unsigned reference route.

== Route description ==
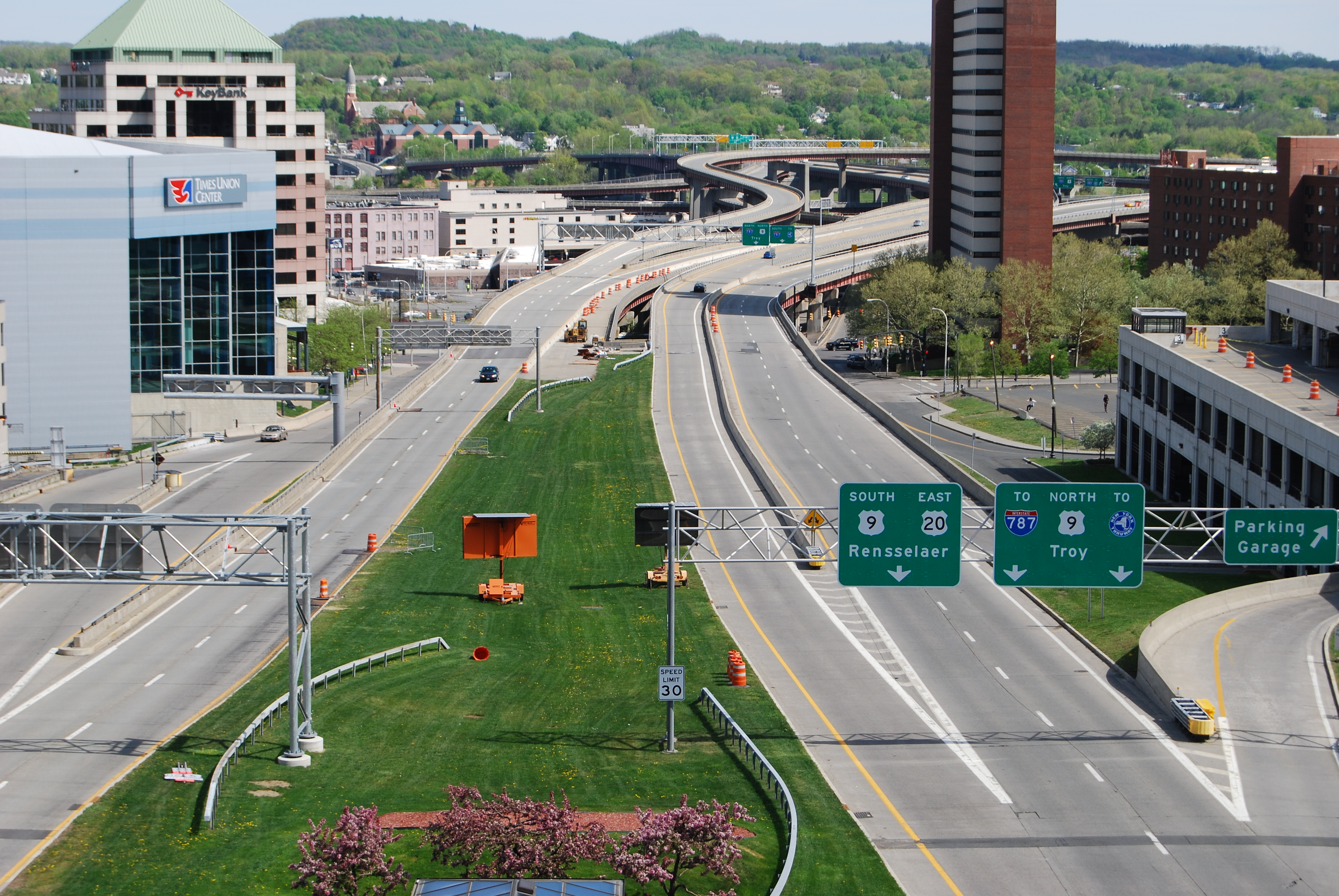
View of the highway from the Empire State Plaza

The highway begins at an unorthodox intersection with South Swan Street, a one-way, one-lane street that runs along the Empire State Plaza's northwestern edge. Ramps connect the westbound highway to Swan Street north and Swan Street north to the eastbound highway, and the highway itself abruptly ends with a U-turn just west of Swan Street. The highway heads to the southeast, passing under a row of buildings that marks the northwestern boundary of the Empire State Plaza. After a short piece open to the sky, the highway heads under the center of the plaza in two tunnels, with access to and from the plaza's parking garage on the right. Two unused tunnels—which would have served through traffic—are present in the center, and two partial tunnels on the outside serve garage traffic.

It emerges from the tunnels just west of Eagle Street, a two-lane street that loosely follows the southeastern boundary of the plaza. The highway subsequently crosses over Eagle Street, with a westbound ramp providing access to the street and the nearby MVP Arena. Continuing eastward, the eastbound direction of the highway splits into two roads, one leading to the Dunn Memorial Bridge and another connecting to I-787. The two halves of the highway are separated by only a jersey barrier until Pearl Street (US 20 and NY 32), where the highway enters a large interchange at the western end of the Dunn Memorial Bridge. Although both directions of the highway are accessible from Pearl Street, there is no eastbound access from the arterial to Pearl Street. The original plans for the highway had included an eastbound exit to the street.

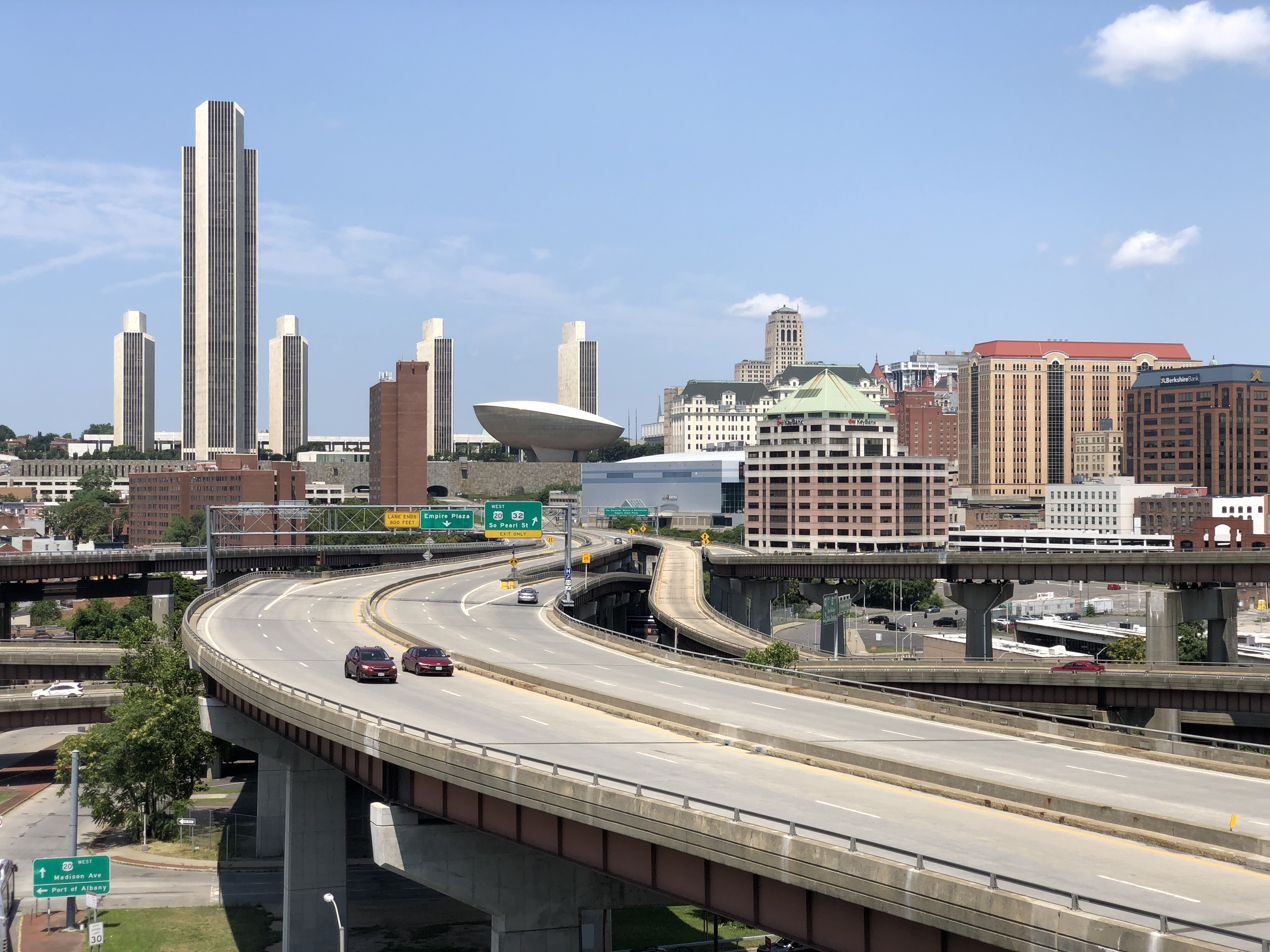
View westward along the arterial from the I-787/US 9/US 20 interchange

East of Pearl Street, both directions of the highway physically split into two ramps. One roadway in each direction funnels traffic to and from I-787, while the other continues eastward onto the Dunn Memorial Bridge. At this point, the South Mall Arterial gives way to US 9 and US 20, which head across the bridge to Rensselaer. US 9 enters and exits the road via ramps paralleling I-787 to the north of the arterial while US 20 ascends onto the bridge via the Pearl Street entrance and exit ramps. The arterial is inventoried by NYSDOT as NY 913V, an unsigned reference route.

== History ==
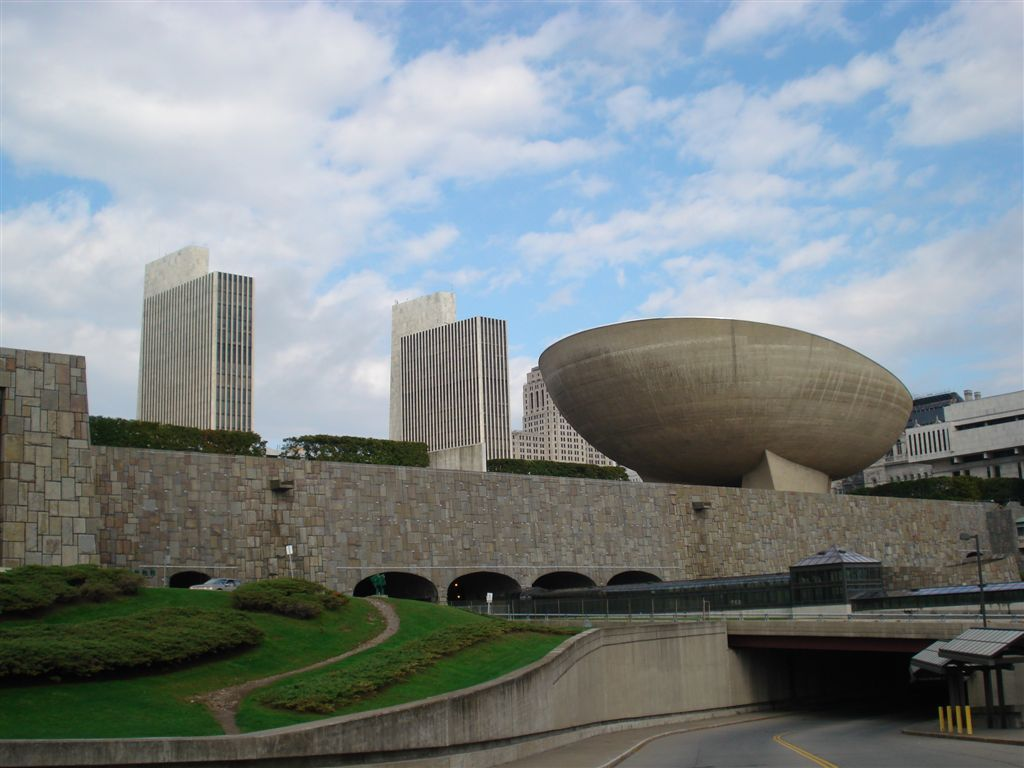
Tunnel entrances under the Empire State Plaza

The highway was built in the early 1960s.

The highway was to continue west to the east edge of Washington Park, where it would end at the Mid-Crosstown Arterial.

== Exit list ==
The entire route is in Albany, Albany County. All exits are unnumbered.

mi	km	Destinations	Notes
0.00	0.00	South Swan Street	Western terminus; at-grade intersection
0.30	0.48	I-787 / US 9 north to New York Thruway (I-87 Toll) – Troy	Eastbound exit and westbound entrance; exit 3A on I-787
0.52	0.84	US 9 south / US 20 east (Dunn Memorial Bridge) – Rensselaer	Eastern terminus
1.000 mi = 1.609 km; 1.000 km = 0.621 mi: Incomplete access
