= David Barclay (soldier) =

Scottish professional soldier, courtier and laird (1610–1686)

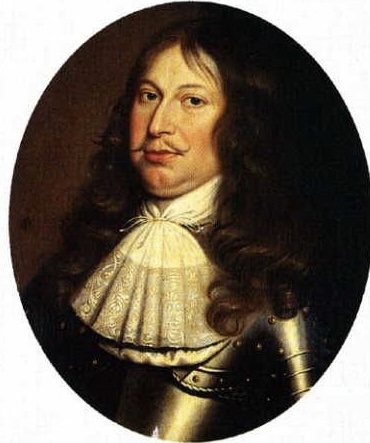
- David Barclay of Ury
- Born: 1610; St Cyrus, Kincardineshire
- Died: 12 October 1686 (aged 76); Ury House, Kincardineshire
- Relatives: Robert Barclay (son); Ewen Cameron of Lochiel (son-in-law)
- Military career
- Allegiance: (Kingdom of France) France (1626–1630) (yes) Swedish Empire (1630–1636); Scottish Covenanters (1644–1648); Scottish Royalists (1648–1654)
- Service years: 1626–1654
- Rank: Colonel
- Conflicts: Thirty Years' War; Wars of the Three Kingdoms; Glencairn's rising

Arms of Barclay

David Barclay of Ury (1610 – October 12, 1686) was a Scottish professional soldier, courtier and the first Laird of Ury. A soldier of fortune, Barclay fought for Gustavus Adolphus, King of Sweden during the Thirty Years' War, and with the Earl of Middleton during the Wars of the Three Kingdoms.

== Background ==
Barclay was the son of David Barclay (1580–1660), 11th of Mathers, of Kincardineshire, Scotland and Elizabeth Livingstone, daughter of John Livingston of Dunipace.

== Career ==
In 1626, he ventured to France to become a soldier of fortune. In 1630, he rose to the rank of a major under Gustavus Adolphus, King of Sweden, during the Thirty Years War. He returned to Scotland in 1636 to serve in the covenanting army, becoming colonel of a cavalry regiment under General John Middleton.

In 1648, he purchased the lands and barony of Ury in Kincardineshire (modern-day Aberdeenshire) from William Keith, 7th Earl of Marischal. As a known associate of the Earl Marischal he was subsequently confined in Edinburgh Castle where he met the John Swinton, who was confined in the same prison.

In 1660, the Restoration ended the Civil War. Barclay served at the court of Charles II and he became an influential figure at Whitehall and Edinburgh.

== Family ==
Barclay married Katherine Gordon (1621–1683), daughter of Sir Robert Gordon, 1st Baronet.

Barclay and Katherine had the following issue:

- Jean Barclay (1663–1720), married Sir Ewen Cameron of Lochiel, to whom she bore eight children
- Lucille Barclay (born 1657) who died unmarried.
- Robert Barclay (born 1648) the eldest son, who became celebrated as the apologist for the Quakers.
- John Barclay (born 1650) the second son, settled in East Jersey in America, where he married and left children.
- David Barclay (born 1653) who died unmarried.
