= Matton Shipyard =

- U.S. National Register of Historic Places
- Location within New York Location within the United States
- Location: Delaware Ave., Cohoes, New York
- Coordinates: 42°46′46″N 73°40′50″W
- Area: 4.13 acres (1.67 ha)
- Built: 1916
- NRHP reference No.: 09000553
- Added to NRHP: July 24, 2009

Matton Shipyard is a historic shipyard and canal boat service yard located on Van Schaick Island at Cohoes in Albany County, New York. It consists of eight extant buildings, various surviving features, and archaeological remains dating to the period 1916 to 1983 when the site functioned as a shipyard, repair facility, and towboat operation on the New York State Barge Canal and Champlain Canal. Extant buildings include the office / stores (c. 1916-1917), watchman's building (c. 1936-1943), sheet metal shop (c. 1937-1938), carpenter shop (c. 1916 and 1936-1943), stores building (c. 1941-1943), pipeshop (c. 1936-1943), pitch building (pre-1936), garage (c. 1916), and electric building. Also on the property are a flagpole (c. 1916), dock, steel launching ramps, fence, and camels. Numerous ruins also occupy the property. The motor ship Day Peckinpaugh is berthed here.

It was listed on the National Register of Historic Places in 2010.

== History ==
In 1916 John E. Matton moved his ship building business south from Waterford to Van Schaick Island, and the shipyard would continue to build canal boats, barges, tugboats, and police boats until closing in 1983. From December 1941 to July 1943 during World War II the shipyard produced five SC-497 class submarine chasers, SC-985 through SC-989 for the US Navy, and from February–June 1944 four tugs for the US Army. In 1945 four of the sub chasers went to service with the US Coast Guard while SC-986 went to the USSR. At the time of closing it was one of the longest operating tug and barge shipbuilders in the United States. The shipyard is currently owned by the New York State Office of Parks, Recreation and Historic Preservation (OPRHP) as part of the Peebles Island State Park, which is turning the shipyard into an educational center, museum, and home for historic vessels. The motor ship Day Peckinpaugh is berthed here and is listed on the National Register of Historic Places.
