= Urger (canal tugboat) =

American tugboat built in 1901

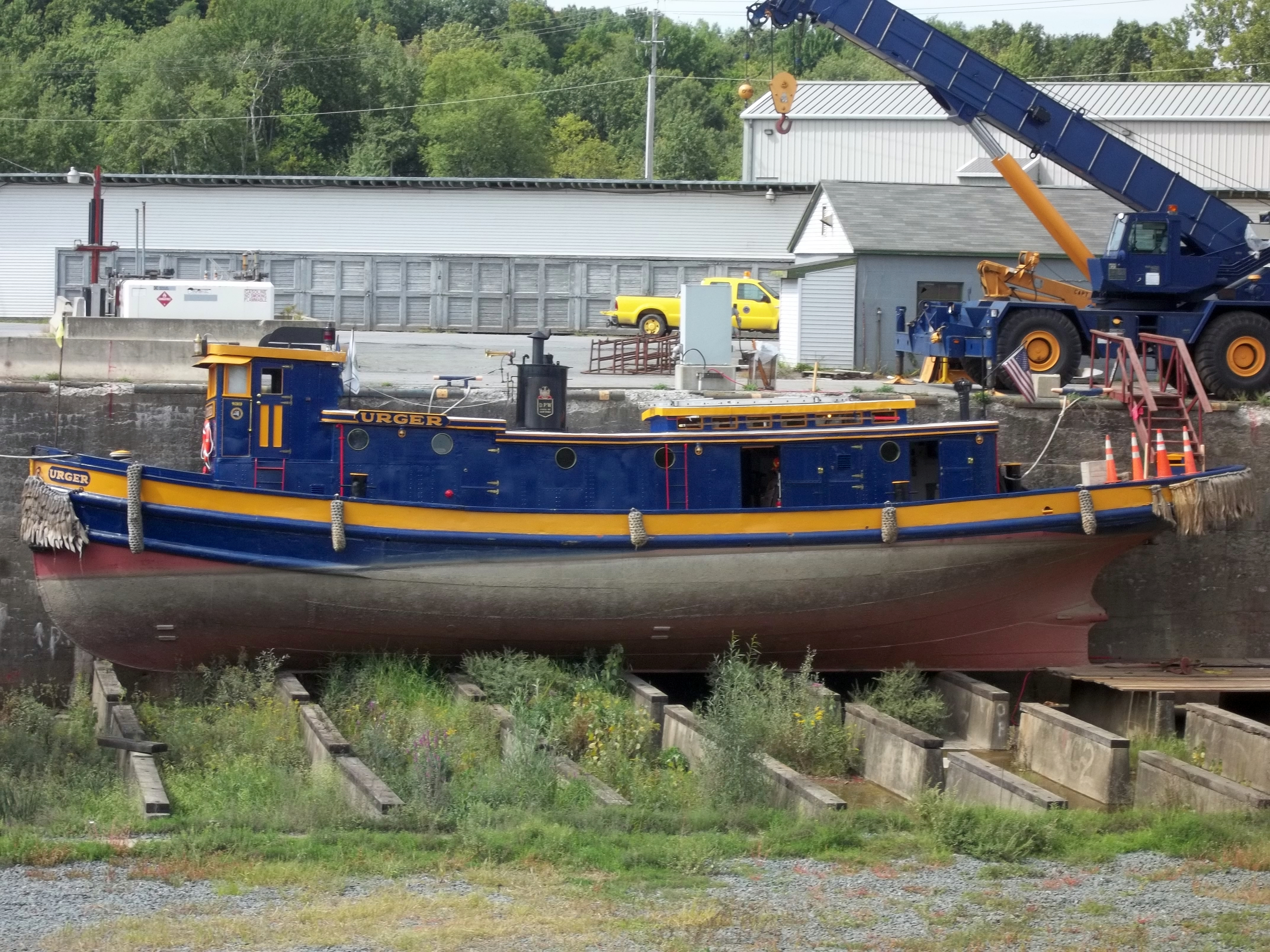
- Urger in 2013

History

United States
- Name: H. J. Dornbos (1901-1922); Urger (1922-present)
- Builder: Johnson Brothers Shipyard and Boiler Works
- Yard number: 11
- Launched: 1901
- Identification: Official number 96562
- Status: Inactive

General characteristics
- Type: Canal tugboat
- Tonnage: 45 GRT
- Length: 73 ft 5 in (22.38 m)
- Beam: 14 ft 9 in (4.50 m)
- Depth: 9 ft (2.7 m)
- Urger (canal tugboat)
- U.S. National Register of Historic Places
- Location within New York
- Nearest city: Waterford, New York
- Coordinates: 42°47′47″N 73°41′15″W
- Built: 1901
- Architect: Johnson Bros.
- Architectural style: canal tugboat
- NRHP reference No.: 01001320
- Added to NRHP: 29 November 2001

Urger, originally named H.J. Dornbos or Henry J. Dornbos, is a historic canal tugboat based at Waterford in Saratoga County, New York.

== Design and construction ==
H. J. Dornbos was built in 1901 as a fish tug for Verduin Brothers (William Verduin) of Grand Haven, Michigan, by Johnson Brothers Shipyard and Boiler Works of Ferrysburg, Michigan as Yard No.11. As built, she was 63 ft (19 m) long, with a beam of 15 ft (4.6 m) and depth of 8 ft (2.4 m), and measuring 44 gross register tonnage.

== Canal service ==
She was purchased for service on the New York State Barge Canal system in 1922 and was in regular use until the 1980s. She was altered in several stages through 1949. She is 73 feet 5 inches (22.38 m) in length, 14 feet 9 inches (4.50 m) in beam and 9 feet (2.7 m) in depth. She is registered at 45 gross tons. She has a molded steel frame, deck beams, and riveted plates.

In 1991 the Urger was reactivated "to educate school children and adults about the importance of New York's historic Canal System." As of 2013 the Urger is "the flagship vessel in the New York State Canal Corporation's fleet." Urger was listed on the National Register of Historic Places in 2001.

The New York State Canal Corporation again retired Urger placing her in drydock at Waterford in 2018, with a view to transferring her to a visitor centre in Montgomery County as an onshore static exhibit. In September 2021, the tug was towed to the corporation's maintenance shops at Lysander, Onondaga County, for engineering survey and review of her future.
