= Van Schaick Island =

Island in Cohoes, New York, U.S.

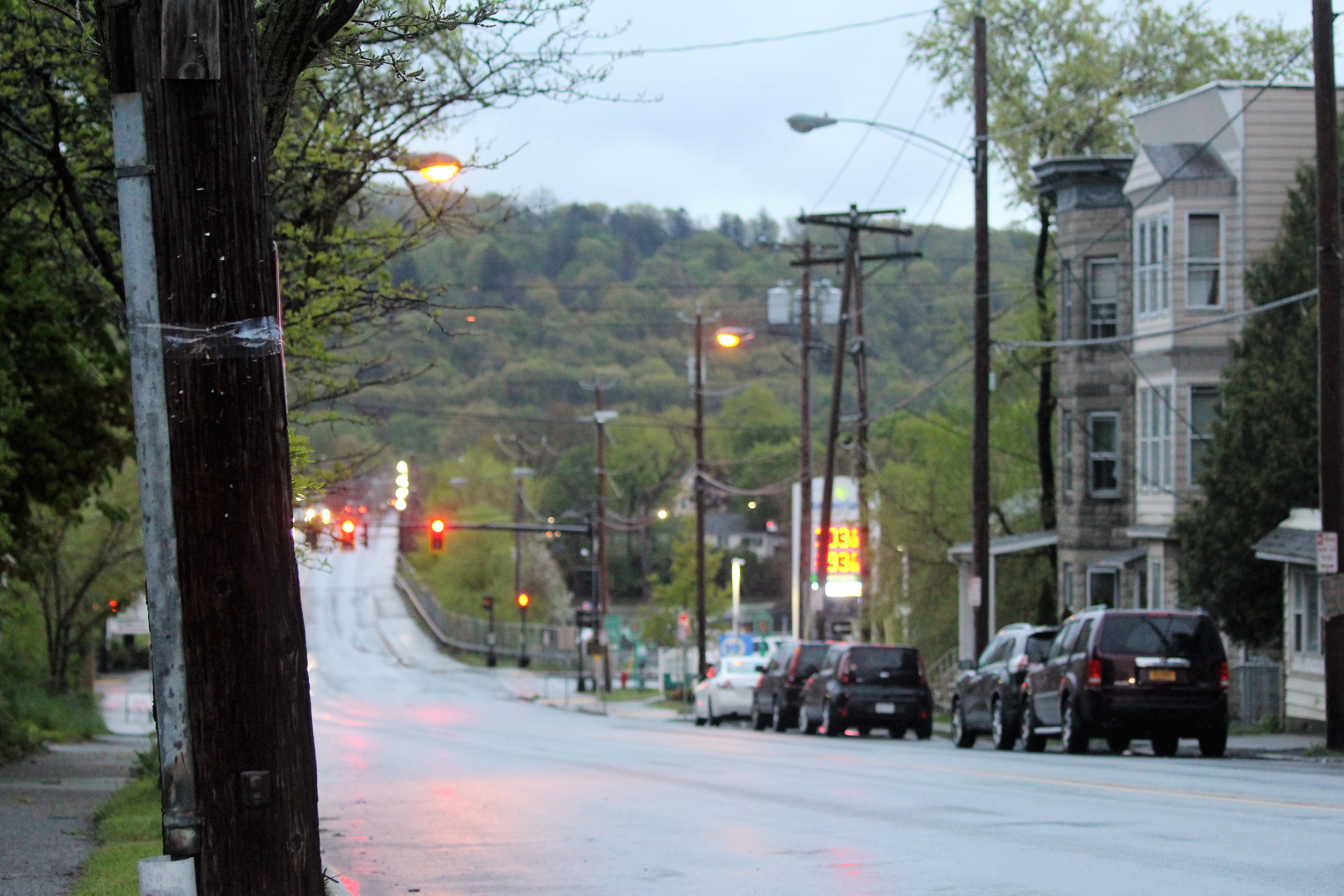
- A view of the 112th Bridge in the Albany County city of Cohoes, New York. The structure, renovated in the late 1990s, connects Van Schaick Island to the Lansingburgh neighborhood of Troy, New York.
- Interactive map of Van Schaick Island

Geography
- Location: Mohawk River delta with Hudson River
- Coordinates: 42°46′2″N 73°41′30″W
- Highest elevation: 66 ft (20.1 m)

Administration
- United States
- City: Cohoes, New York

Demographics
- Population: 1,400 (1992)

Van Schaick Island is an island in the city of Cohoes, New York. Van Schaick is a part of the delta of the Mohawk River at its mouth with the Hudson River. The island has been referred to by numerous names including Quehemesicos, Long, Anthony's, Isle of Cohoes, and Cohoes Island. The island was home to US Revolutionary War fortifications in the 18th century, and to an important shipyard in the 20th century. The shipyard and the extreme northern end of the island is part of the Peebles Island State Park

== History ==
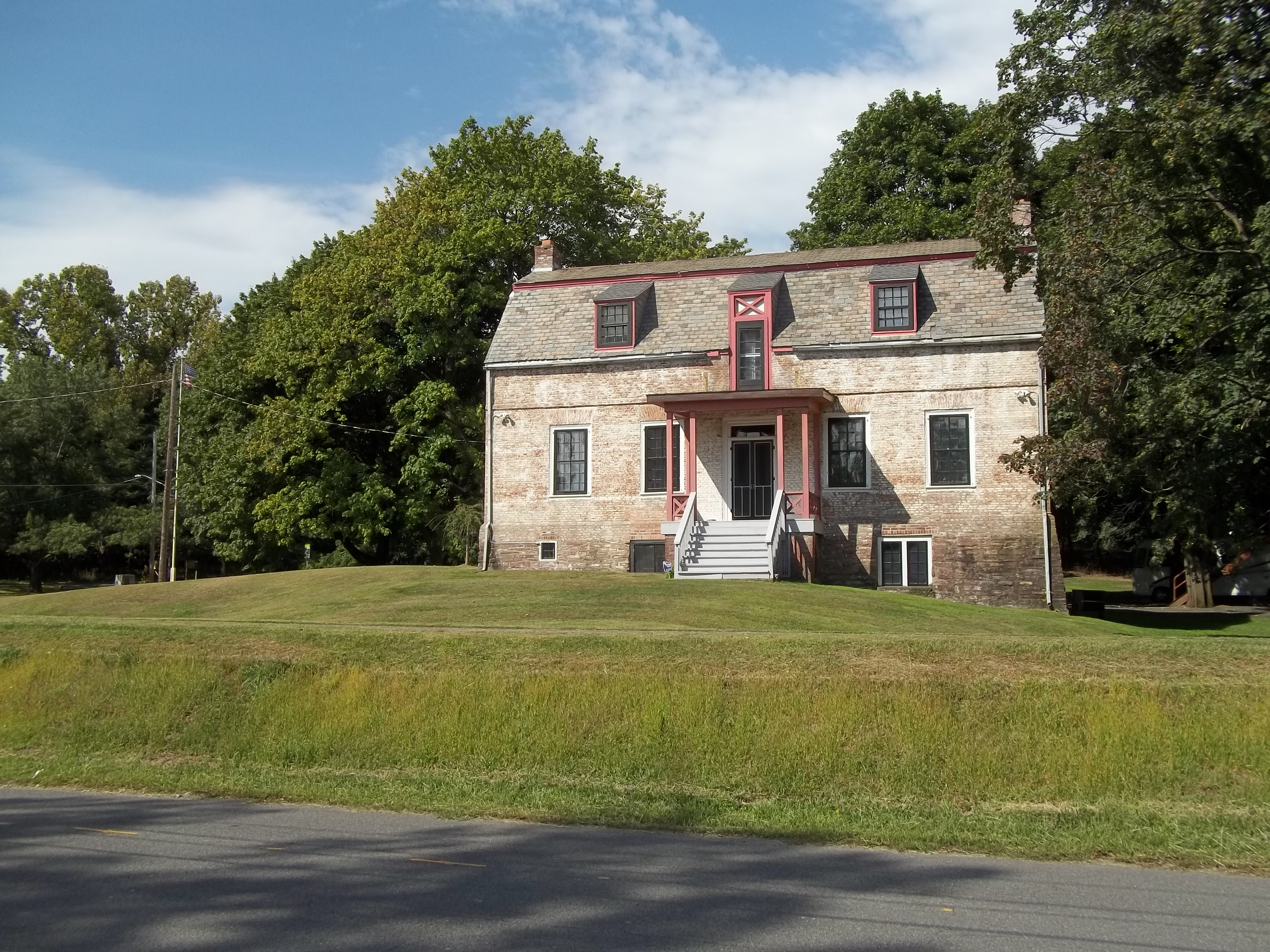
The Van Schaick Mansion, built between 1735 and 1755, was the home of Anthony Van Schaick.

Henry Hudson was the first European explorer to have seen Van Schaick Island. Through his exploration the island and the entire watershed of the Hudson River became the domain of the Dutch colony of New Netherland. Shortly after the English conquered New Netherland, Van Schaick Island was purchased in 1665 by Goosen Gerritse Van Schaick and Philip Piertse Schuyler under the authority of New York Governor Richard Nicolls from the Mohicans Itamonet, Ahemhameth, and Kishocama. Van Schaick was but one island in the larger Halve Maan patent which included the other islands of the Mohawk delta and a strip of land along the northern shore of the Mohawk River (present-day Waterford). The island was referred to by the Native Americans as Quehemesicos in the Mohican language while the Dutch called it Long Island.

In 1674 Schuyler conveyed by deed his share of the patent to Van Schaick, who died soon afterwards in 1676, at which point the patent devolved to his wife and then his son Anthony in 1687, for whom the island was referred to as Anthony's Island. Goosen Gerritse Van Schaick appears to have never visited his patent though Anthony did move there. It was Anthony van Schaick who built the Van Schaick Mansion sometime between 1735–55, though a previous smaller wooden structure may have been residence to the family before the mansion. In Anthony's will he left a stipulation for a cemetery to be built just north of the mansion. The last Van Schaick at the mansion was in the early 20th century, Mrs. William L. Adams whose first husband was Gerald Van Schaick.

Van Schaick Island was an important piece of the Continental Trail, the route from New York City through Albany north to Montreal, with the river road traversing the many islands at the mouth of the Mohawk River: Green Island, Van Schaick, Peebles, and then going on to Halfmoon Point (today the village of Waterford). Starting on August 8, 1777 the Continental Army with over 5,000 soldiers was camped on Van Schaick and Peebles islands, first under General Philip Schuyler and then General Horatio Gates. Governor George Clinton made the mansion the temporary state capitol from August 22–27. In September the army moved north to Bemis Heights and Stillwater where the Battle of Saratoga would be fought.

In 1916 John E. Matton moved his ship building business south from Waterford to Van Schaick Island. The Matton Shipyard would continue to build canal boats, barges, tugboats, and police boats until closing in 1983. From December 1941 to July 1943 during World War II the shipyard produced five SC-497 class submarine chasers, SC-985 through SC-989 for the US Navy, and from February–June 1944 four tugs for the US Army. In 1945 four of the sub chasers went to service with the US Coast Guard while SC-986 went to the USSR. At the time of closing it was one of the longest operating tug and barge shipbuilders in the United States. The shipyard is currently owned by the New York State Office of Parks, Recreation and Historic Preservation (OPRHP) as part of the Peebles Island State Park, which is turning the shipyard into an educational center, museum, and home for historic vessels. The motor ship Day Peckinpaugh is berthed here and is listed on the National Register of Historic Places.

== Demographics ==
In 1992 Van Schaick Island had roughly 1,400 residents, mostly Italian, French, and Polish.

== Geography ==
Van Schaick Island is a part of the city of Cohoes, and is located in the Mohawk River delta, where that river branches into several different channels and flows into the Hudson River. These branches are often referred to locally as sprouts. The second and third sprouts flow on the north, west, and south; the Hudson River is along the eastern shore. These sprouts separate the island from other islands in the delta, to the north is Peebles Island, Green Island is to the south, and to the west of the island is Simmons Island (also a part of Cohoes) and the mainland portion of the city of Cohoes. To the east the Hudson River separates the island from the Lansingburgh neighborhood of the city of Troy.

== Education ==
Van Schaick Island is a part of the Cohoes City School District and the children attend Van Schaick Elementary School, which is on the island, for kindergarten through fifth grade; Cohoes Middle for sixth through eighth, and Cohoes High School for ninth through twelfth.

== Transportation ==
Van Schaick Island is crossed east/west by Ontario Street (NYS Route 470), the main street of the island. The east end of Ontario Street crosses the 112th Street Bridge over the Hudson River and connects the island to Rensselaer County. This is the primary connection between northern Albany and northern Renssselaer counties. At the western gateway Ontario crosses a bridge over one of the Mohawk branches to Simmons Island and from there to NYS Route 787 and Downtown Cohoes. The rest of Van Schaick Island is in a traditional north-south/east-west street grid. The eastern side of the island was home to a Delaware and Hudson Railway line along Delaware Avenue that ran from Green Island north through the Island to Peebles Island and Saratoga County. The Black Bridge to Green Island was built in the 1890s and the rail line was still used into the 1960s. The Open Space Institute purchased the railway for the purpose of a rails to trails project and once the conversion to a bike-hike trail (the Delaware Avenue Trail) is complete the Institute will turn the deed over to the city of Cohoes. The Delaware Avenue Trail will connect the Mohawk Hudson Hike/Bike Trail and the Champlain Canal Bike Trail. There is also a CDTA bus stop, located at Ontario Street & Park Avenue

== Recreation ==
On Van Schaick Island is a city park with a pond which is used for ice skating; a private golf course; walking and biking trails; and a baseball field. Van Schaick Island Country Club was founded in 1895 with only two holes. The current nine holes were designed in 1915 and the name was changed to Van Schaick Island Country Club the following year. Two marinas on the island allow access to the Hudson River.
