= New York State Route 787 =

State highway in Albany County, New York, US

New York State Route 787
- Cohoes Boulevard
- Map of Albany County in eastern New York with NY 787 highlighted in red

Route information
- Maintained by NYSDOT
- Length: 2.56 mi (4.12 km)
- Existed: by 1990–present

Major junctions
- South end: I-787 / NY 7 in Colonie
- North end: NY 32 in Cohoes

Location
- Country: United States
- State: New York
- Counties: Albany

Highway system
- New York Highways; Interstate; US; State; Reference; Parkways
| ← I-787 | → I-790 |

New York State Route 787 (NY 787), known locally as Cohoes Boulevard, is a state highway in Albany County, New York, in the United States. It is a northern extension of Interstate 787 (I-787), continuing northward from the underpass at NY 7 near Green Island to downtown Cohoes at NY 32. For its entire length, NY 787 runs parallel to, and between, NY 32 and the Hudson River.

== Route description ==
NY 787 begins at the partial cloverleaf interchange connecting NY 7 to I-787, the continuation of NY 787 south of NY 7, near Green Island. NY 787 begins as a four-lane freeway as it lowers to grade level a small distance north of the I-787/NY 7 interchange. Near the Green Island-Cohoes city line, NY 787 becomes a four-lane boulevard and intersects Tibbits Avenue, the first in a series of local streets connecting NY 787 to NY 32, which NY 787 parallels as it heads northward through Cohoes.

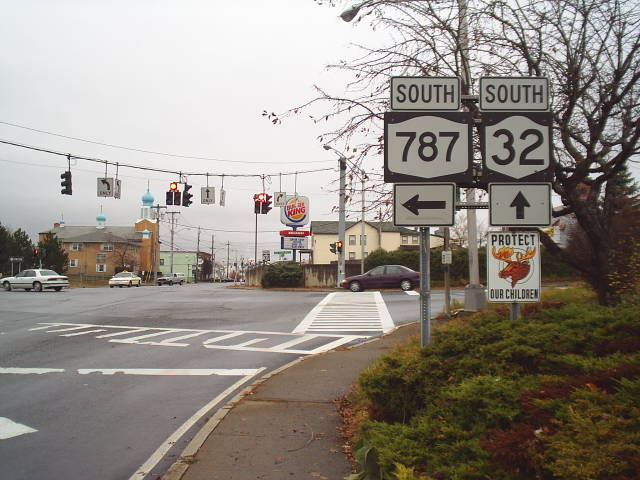
Route 787's northern terminus as viewed from Route 32 in Cohoes

After intersections with Dyke Avenue and Bridge Avenue (the latter leading to lower Van Schaick Island) on the western bank of the Hudson River, NY 787 intersects NY 470, an east–west route linking Cohoes to northern Troy via upper Van Schaick Island. Past NY 470, NY 787 curves to the northwest and immediately intersects NY 32. Although NY 787 terminates here, New Courtland Street (later named North Mohawk Street and Cohoes Crescent Road) continues northwest from the intersection along the Mohawk River to U.S. Route 9 in Colonie, just south of the hamlet of Crescent, in Saratoga County.

Along NY 787, markers continue from those of I-787, without interruption. At the beginning of NY 787, some reference markers have the letter "I" along the top (route) row. The markers continue from those of I-787 and the control segments thereof.

== History ==
The southernmost section of NY 787 was originally built in the early 1970s as part of I-787. At the time, the highway ended at a junction with Arch Street. It was extended north to Tibbits Avenue in the early 1980s and to NY 470 by 1990, at which time the portion of the I-787 freeway north of NY 7 was designated as NY 787. The short connector between NY 470 and NY 32 was completed by the following year.

== Major intersections ==
Mileposts are a northern continuation of mileposts from I-787. The entire route is in Albany County.

| Location | mi | km | Exit | Destinations | Notes |
|---|---|---|---|---|---|
| Town of Colonie | 9.55 | 15.37 | | I-787 south – Albany | Continuation south |
| Town of Colonie | 9.55 | 15.37 | 9 | NY 7 to I-87 – Schenectady, Saratoga Springs, Troy, Bennington | Signed as exits 9E (east) and 9W (west) |
| Town of Colonie | 10.31 | 16.59 | Northern end of freeway section | | |
| Town of Colonie | 10.31 | 16.59 | | Tibbits Avenue – Maplewood, Green Island | |
| Cohoes | 11.99 | 19.30 | | NY 470 – Troy | |
| Cohoes | 12.11 | 19.49 | | NY 32 – Waterford | Northern terminus |
1.000 mi = 1.609 km; 1.000 km = 0.621 mi
