= Interstate 787 =

Highway in New York

Interstate 787
- Map of New York with I-787 highlighted in red, and exits maintained as reference routes in blue

Route information
- Auxiliary route of I-87
- Maintained by NYSDOT
- Length: 9.55 mi (15.37 km)
- Existed: mid-1960s–present
- NHS: Entire route

Major junctions
- South end: I-87 Toll / New York Thruway / US 9W in Albany
- US 9 / US 20 / NY 5 / South Mall Arterial in Albany; I-90 in Albany
- North end: NY 7 / NY 787 in Green Island

Location
- Country: United States
- State: New York
- Counties: Albany

Highway system
- Interstate Highway System; Main; Auxiliary; Suffixed; Business; Future; New York Highways; Interstate; US; State; Reference; Parkways
← I-781	→ NY 787

Interstate 787 (I-787) is an auxiliary Interstate Highway in the US state of New York. I-787 is the main highway for those traveling into and out of downtown Albany. The southern terminus is, per New York traffic data, at New York State Thruway (I-87) exit 23 southwest of downtown Albany. However, current signage indicates the terminus as along I-787's ramp to US Route 9W (US 9W). The northern terminus of the route is unclear, with some sources placing the terminus at 8th Street in Troy, creating an overlap with New York State Route 7 (NY 7) between Green Island and Troy. Other documents show I-787 as terminating at its interchange with NY 7 and NY 787 in the town of Colonie. Regardless, the route is 10.16 miles (16.35 km) long if extended to Troy, or 9.55 miles (15.37 km) excluding the unsigned NY 7 overlap.

North of NY 7, I-787 continues north as NY 787 to the city of Cohoes.

== Route description ==
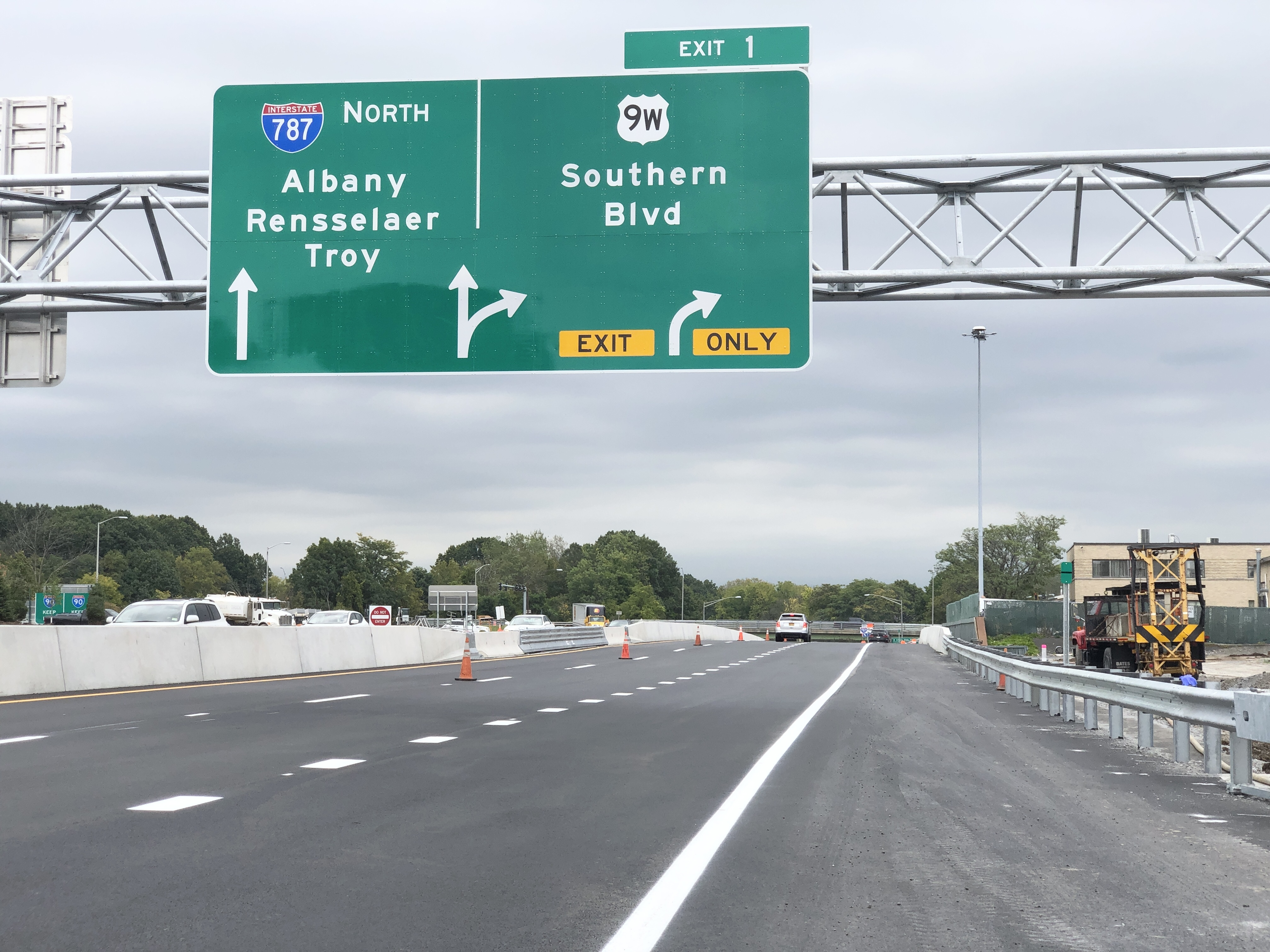
View northbound along I-787 at exit 1

I-787 officially begins at the US 9W exit (formerly a toll barrier for I-87/Thruway exit 23); however, a short 0.57-mile (0.92 km) spur between US 9W and the interchange connecting I-787 to the Thruway, designated as New York State Route 912S (NY 912S), an unsigned reference route, is signed as I-787. At the east end of the interchange (exit 1) with I-87, I-787 northbound merges with NY 912S, progressing due east for a short distance before curving to the northeast ahead of the Delaware and Hudson Railway mainline near exit 2 (NY 32). Past NY 32, I-787 parallels the Hudson River as it heads northward into the heart of downtown Albany, featuring a pair of exits with US 9 and US 20 at a massive interchange southeast of the Empire State Plaza on the west bank of the Hudson.

North of downtown Albany, I-787 interchanges with I-90 at exit 5 prior to crossing into Menands and meeting NY 32 once more at exit 6 by way of a trumpet interchange. The ramp from the trumpet to NY 32, a 0.28-mile-long (0.45 km) roadway, is designated as unsigned NY 913T. Farther north in Menands, I-787 intersects NY 378 (exit 7) by way of a partial cloverleaf interchange. In Watervliet, I-787 has one interchange with 23rd Street (exit 8) before reaching another partial cloverleaf interchange with NY 7 and NY 787 (exit 9) in Green Island.

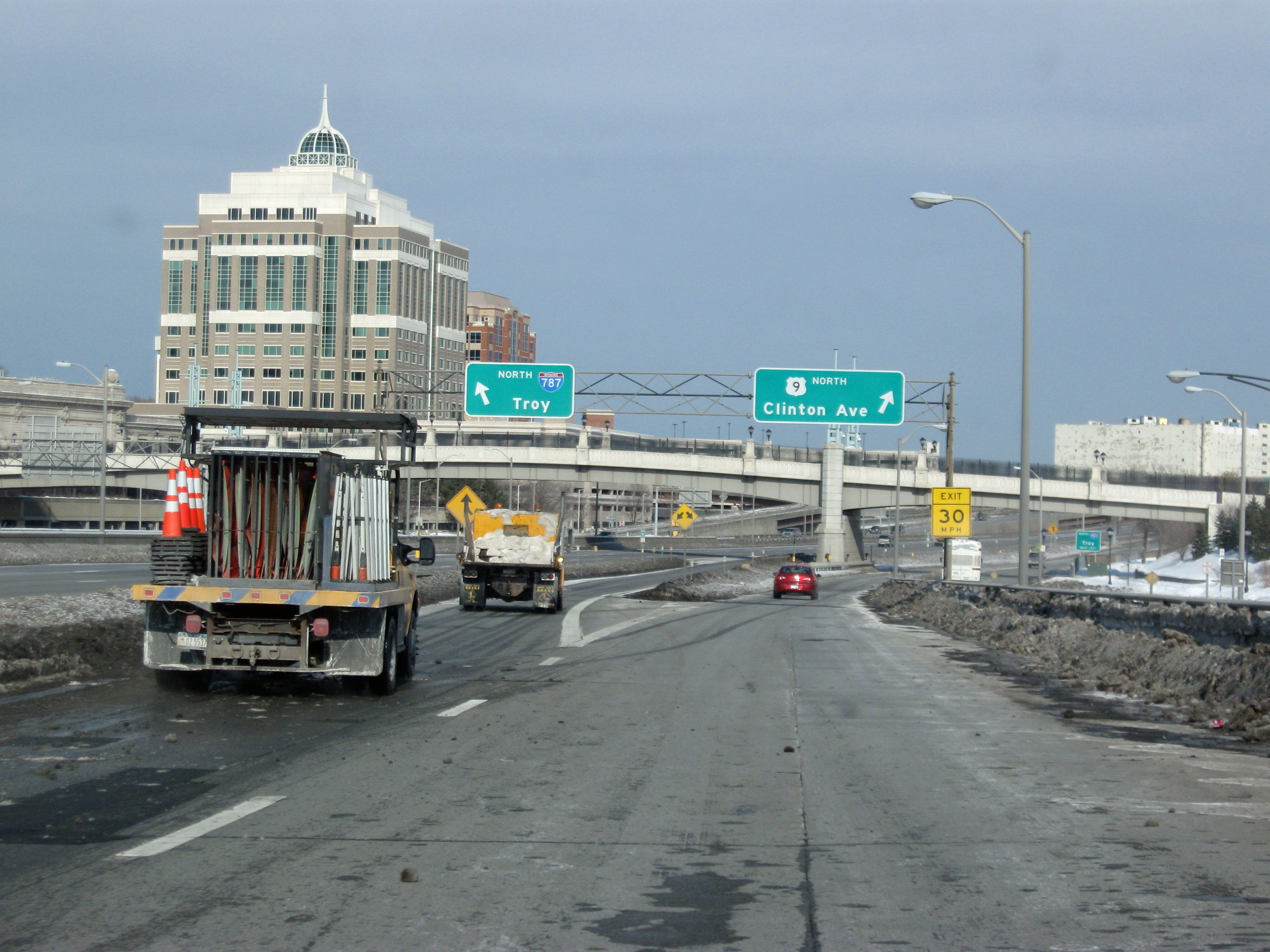
I-787 northbound at exit 4B (US 9 north)

I-787's alignment after exit 9 is unclear. Appendix E of the 2008 New York State Department of Transportation (NYSDOT) Traffic Data Report and the Consolidated Laws of New York place the terminus at 8th Street in Troy, creating an overlap with NY 7 across the Hudson River via the Collar City Bridge. Additionally, there are shields for I-787 on the Collar City Bridge east of the Hudson River, and the bridge’s roadway uses I-787 reference markers instead of NY 7. Other sources, including the National Highway System map of Albany published by the Federal Highway Administration (FHWA) and NYSDOT's official description of signed routes in New York State, identifies the terminus as the NY 7/NY 787 interchange near Green Island. Contemporary maps of the Albany area also lack I-787 shields on the Collar City Bridge, signing the roadway only as NY 7.

According to NYSDOT traffic counts, I-787 is 10.16 miles (16.35 km) long; by limiting I-787 to the section between the Thruway and NY 7, the length is reduced to 9.55 miles (15.37 km).

== History ==
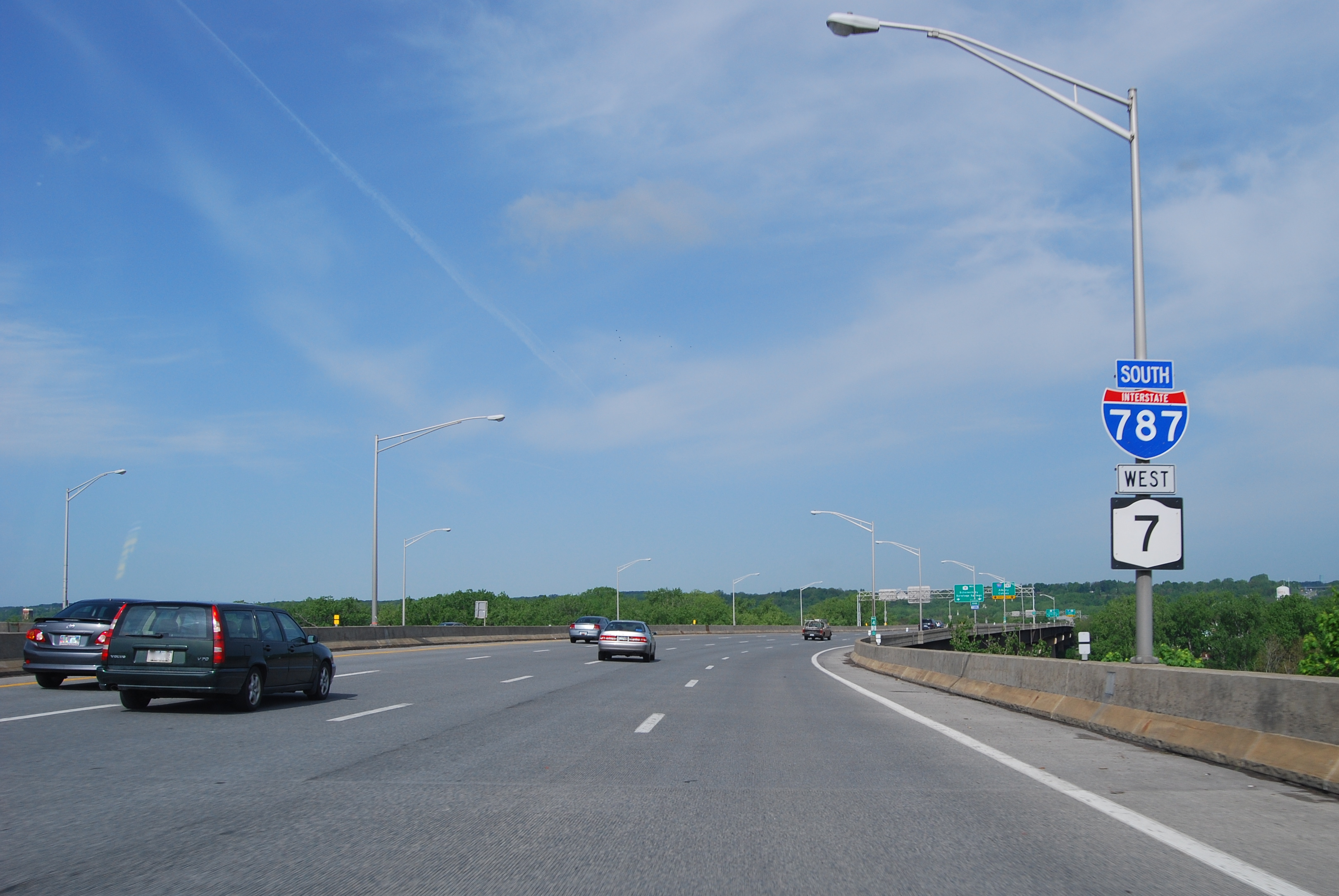
Collar City Bridge traveling west (south on I-787)

Construction began in the early 1960s on the first segment of I-787 from I-87 to Bassett Street. It was completed and opened to traffic in the mid-1960s. By 1968, construction had begun on the remainder of I-787 south of Watervliet. The portion of the highway between I-90 and NY 378 was completed by 1971; the rest of I-787 south of 23rd Street in Watervliet was built and open to traffic by 1973. The ramps from the South Mall Arterial were opened in 1974. An extension of the freeway north to Arch Street near Green Island was completed by 1977. By 1980, the majority of modern exit 9 was completed even though the Collar City Bridge and the "Alternate Route 7" freeway had yet to be constructed. The Collar City Bridge over the Hudson River opened in 1980, connecting the preexisting ramps at exit 9 to downtown Troy.

When I-787 was first planned, its northern terminus was at US 4 in Troy. On January 1, 1970, the I-787 designation was truncated westward to what is now exit 9 near Green Island while the then-proposed Collar City Bridge became (albeit on paper) part of I-88, a new highway extending from Binghamton to Troy by way of the Susquehanna Expressway and Alternate Route 7. The extension of I-88 never materialized as Alternate Route 7 ended up becoming a realignment of NY 7 when it was completed in 1985.

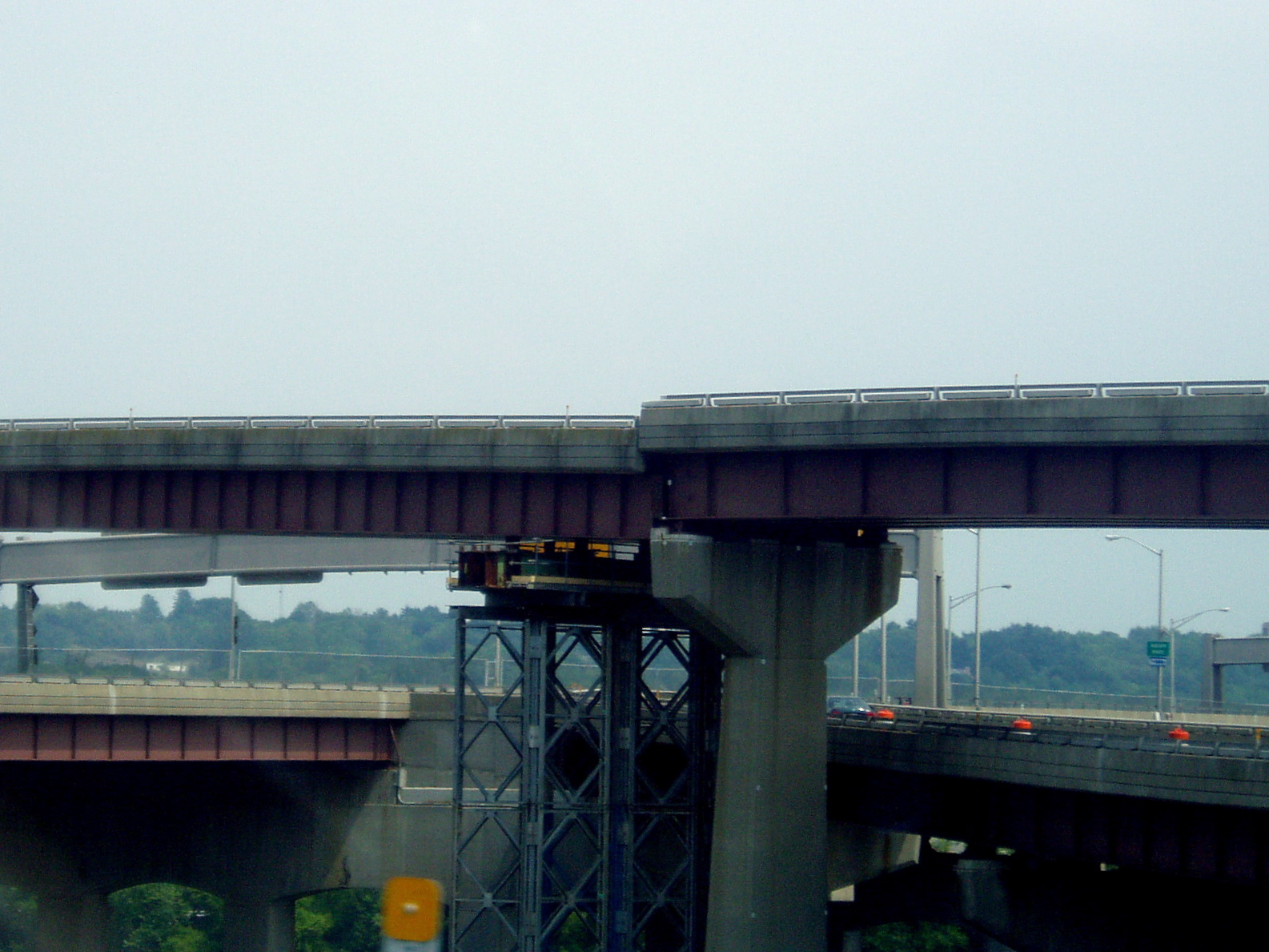
Northbound ramp that slipped off its supports, supported by temporary tower

In 2005, an elevated section of the northbound exit 3 offramp slipped off its supports, causing temporary closure of the ramp and causing disruption of the flow of traffic into the Empire State Plaza. The ramp connects I-787 with the South Mall Arterial. Initially, most roads and ramps near or under the elevated highway were closed, but, once temporary piers were in place, most roads reopened. A detour was set up to allow northbound traffic to enter the plaza, but it required crossing the Hudson River over the Dunn Memorial Bridge and traveling through the city of Rensselaer to get back on the bridge, allowing access into the plaza. The slip caused the south end of a simple span of the overpass to drop about two feet (0.61 m). The pier stands 80 feet (24 m) tall at the slippage point. Nobody was seriously injured by the slipped ramp.

In March 2018, New York Governor Andrew Cuomo announced that his administration had awarded $3.1 million (equivalent to $3.8 million in 2024) toward the conversion of a little-used I-787 exit ramp into a park called the Albany Skyway. The park, which connects downtown Albany to the Hudson River waterfront, opened on April 29, 2022.

The Regional Economic Development Council initiated the Albany Skyway project with a $350,000 (equivalent to $447,000 in 2024) grant in 2016. With funding from federal grants, city revitalization funds, and a $3.1-million (equivalent to $3.8 million in 2024) NYSDOT award, the city enacted a plan to deconstruct parts of I-787 and create a multiuse design. The half-mile (0.80 km) Albany Skyway path, completed in 2022, links the downtown area of Albany with the Hudson River waterfront nature preserve. As a form of community equitable planning, the skyway aims to provide equal opportunities to access natural space, in the form of a park for underserved areas in the city.

== Future ==
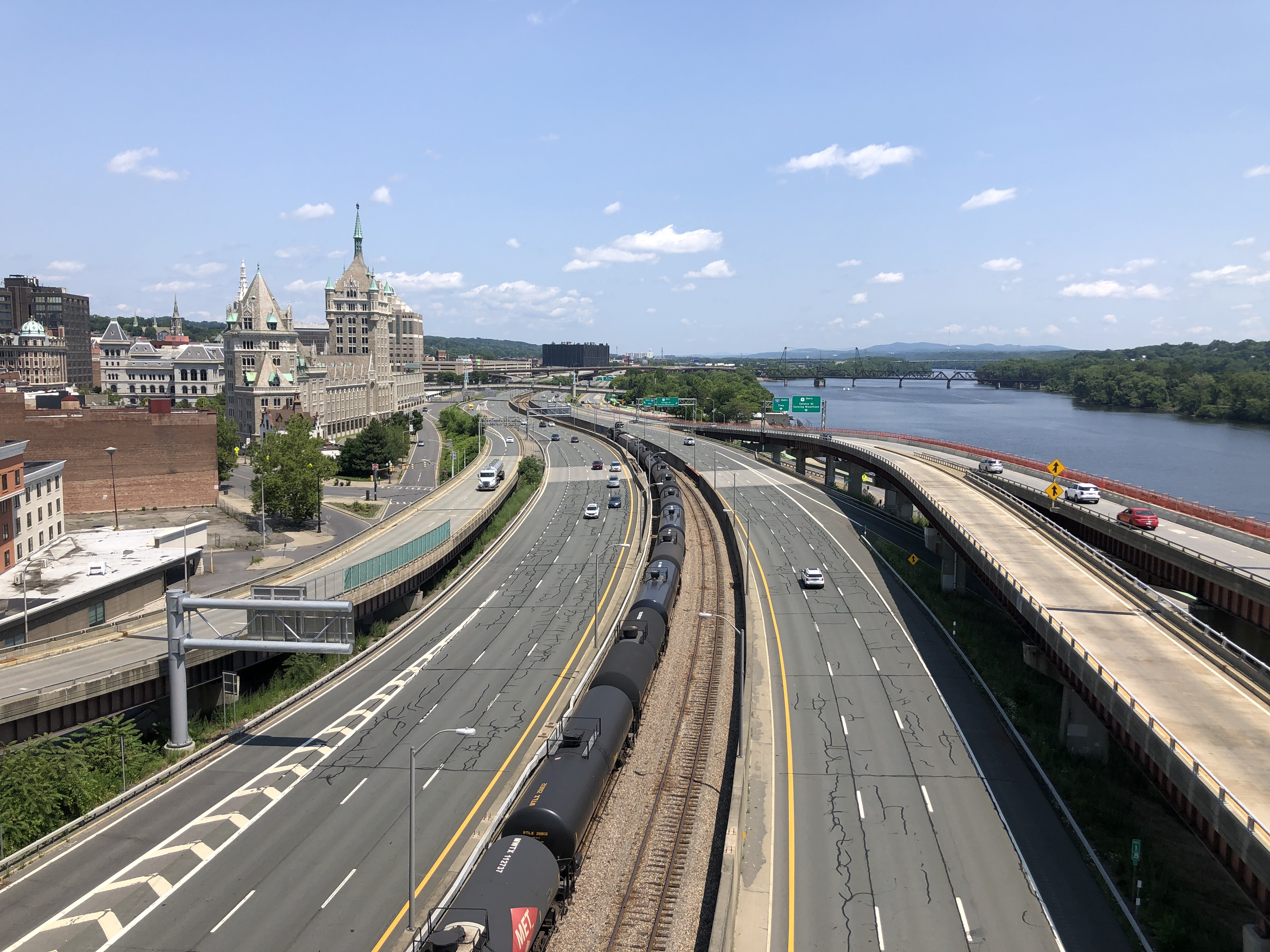
View north along I-787 from the US 9/US 20/South Mall Arterial "circle" interchange

=== Early proposals and studies ===
In March 2018, a draft report was released regarding the findings of an I-787/Hudson Waterfront Corridor Study. The study was prepared for the Capital District Transportation Committee. The draft report set forth various recommendations for improvements to I-787, including "re-configuring some interchanges, making the waterfront more accessible to bicyclists and pedestrians, converting from an expressway to a more traditional roadway, and pursuing strategies to reduce travel demand". The draft report noted that 88,000 vehicles per day travel into downtown Albany on I-787. It also noted that the report did not recommend significant changes, such as making I-787 into an underground highway or removing it altogether; such ideas would be complicated by railroad tracks in the I-787 median and by the fact that I-787 is located in a flood plain. Released in May 2019, the final report detailed various possible future plans for I-787. Those potential future plans included the conversion of the entirety of the Interstate to an at-grade urban arterial.

=== Reimagine 787 ===
On June 22, 2023, the Planning and Environmental Linkages (PEL) study was announced by the New York State Department of Transportation to recommend transportation strategies to "reimagine Interstate 787", funded with $5 million, supplemented with an additional $400,000 in federal grants authorized by the Infrastructure Investment and Jobs Act. On May 1, 2024, the state Department of Transportation unveiled the proposals as a "rough first cut" that would be refined following public input. With a highway rehabilitation effort estimated to cost $3.5 billion across the next several decades, six alternatives included a new Dunn Memorial Bridge to be rebuilt south from its current location.

- One alternative proposed reconstructing the highway to add six connections in Albany and to the Hudson River waterfront at an estimated cost of $5.3 billion.
- Four options called for the highway to be replaced by various boulevard concepts, ranging from estimated costs of $2.8 billion to $6.6 billion.
- The final alternative proposed a tunnel following the highway's existing footprint, estimated to cost $7.4 billion.

On August 5, 2025, the state Department of Transportation released the final Reimagine 787 study. The release allowed the commencement of a two-year environmental review for future projects along the highway. Governor Kathy Hochul directed $40 million in the state budget to fund the review, which was included in the $400 million pledged to the city of Albany.

The five alternatives ranged from retaining and modernizing the existing highway to replacing portions of the corridor with surface boulevards. Two alternatives retained the highway while relocating the Dunn Memorial Bridge and converting the South Mall Expressway into a city street, with one providing a more direct connection between the Port of Albany and Routes 9 and 20 in Rensselaer. The remaining alternatives proposed boulevard configurations, including a six-lane boulevard along the existing corridor, paired one-way boulevards using Broadway, and a two-way boulevard between Broadway and Orange Street.

Estimated costs of the proposals ranged from $2.8 billion to $6 billion, with construction requiring up to nine years. Assemblywoman Pat Fahy, who proposed the funding three years prior, said the study removed "one of the biggest hurdles" in the Reimagine 787 initiative.

On April 2, 2026, a community outreach center opened to provide information and gather public feedback on the Reimagine 787 initiative.

== Exit list ==
The entire route is in Albany County.

Location	mi	km	Exit	Destinations	Notes
Albany	0.00	0.00	1	I-87 Toll / New York Thruway to Mass Pike east (I-90 east) – New York, Montreal, Buffalo	Southern terminus; exit 23 on I-87 / Thruway
Albany	0.32	0.51	1	US 9W (Southern Boulevard) – Albany	Signed for Southern Boulevard northbound, Albany southbound; last southbound exit before toll
Albany	0.94	1.51	2	NY 32 (South Pearl Street) – Port of Albany	NY 32/S. Pearl Street not signed northbound
Albany	1.97	3.17	3A	US 9 south / US 20 east – Rensselaer, Empire Plaza	Signed as exit 3 northbound; access to Empire Plaza via South Mall Arterial; also serves Albany–Rensselaer station
Albany	2.40	3.86	4	US 9 north (Clinton Street) / US 20 west (Madison Avenue) / NY 5 west – Downtown Albany, Port of Albany	Signed as exits 3B (west) and 4B (north) southbound; NY 5 not signed
Albany	2.80	4.51	4A	Colonie Street / Columbia Street	Southbound exit only
Albany	3.36	5.41	5	I-90 – Buffalo, Boston, MA	Exit 6A on I-90
Menands	4.20	6.76	6	NY 32 – Menands	
Menands	6.27	10.09	7	NY 378 – Watervliet, Loudonville, Menands, South Troy, Troy	Signed as 7E (east) and 7W (west); serves Hudson Valley Community College and Joseph L. Bruno Stadium
Watervliet	8.91	14.34	8	To NY 2 / 23rd Street – Watervliet, Green Island	
Town of Colonie	9.55	15.37	9	NY 7 to I-87 – Schenectady, Saratoga Springs, Troy, Bennington	Signed as exits 9E (east) and 9W (west)
Town of Colonie	9.55	15.37	–	NY 787 north (Cohoes Boulevard) – Cohoes, Waterford	Continuation north; to Mohawk Towpath Scenic Byway
1.000 mi = 1.609 km; 1.000 km = 0.621 mi: Electronic toll collection; Incomplete access

== See also ==
- New York State Route 787 for grade level intersections to the north.
- New York State Route 910F (Fuller Road Alternate), which was intended to connect to I-787 at I-87 and US 9W
