= Van Schaick House =

Historic house in New York, United States

- U.S. National Register of Historic Places
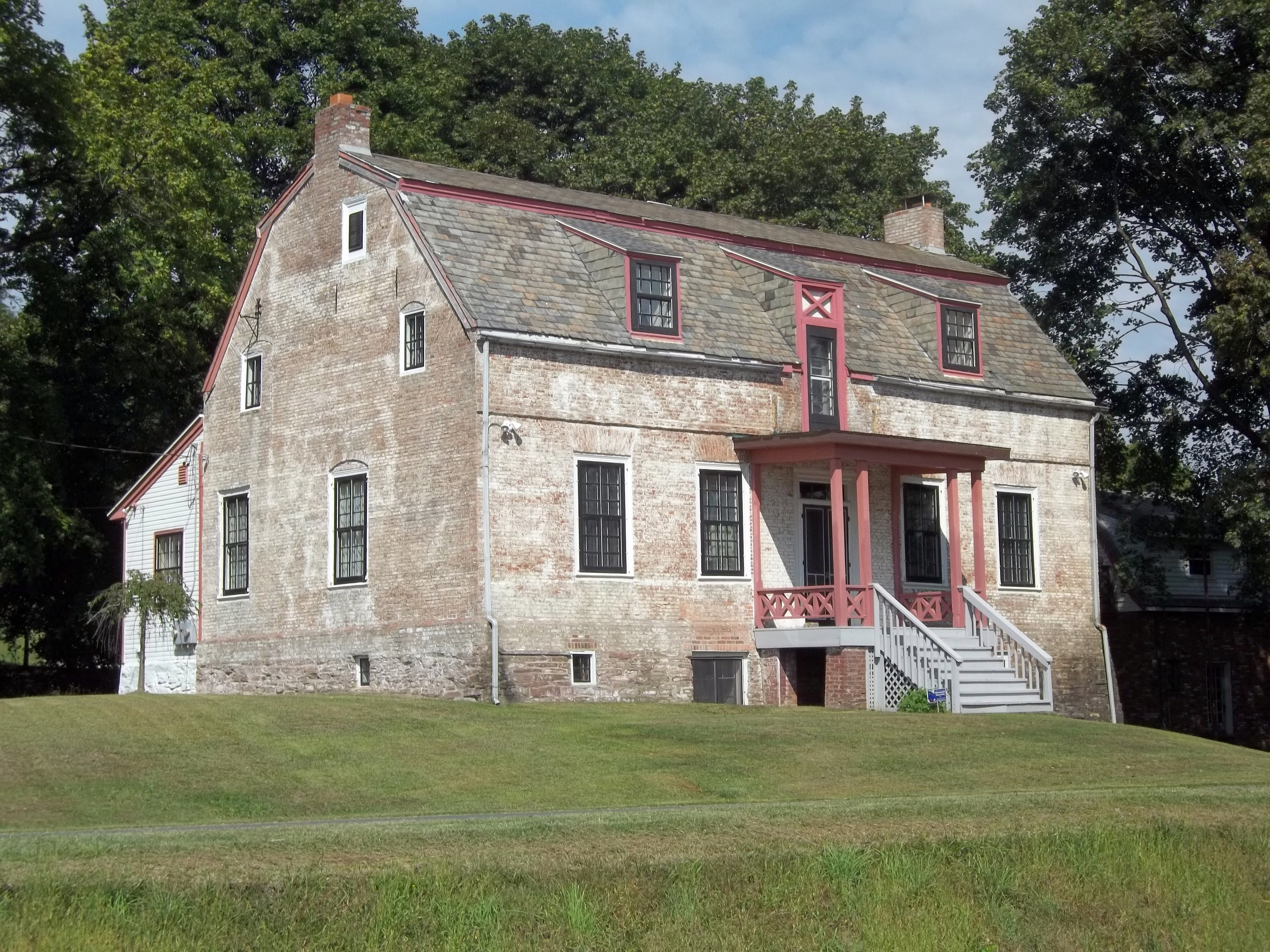

- Location within New York Location within the United States
- Interactive map showing the location for Van Schaick House
- Location: Van Schaick Ave. and the Delaware & Hudson RR track, Cohoes, New York
- Coordinates: 42°46′3″N 73°41′13″W
- Area: 0 acres (0 ha)
- Built: 1735; 291 years ago
- NRHP reference No.: 71000528
- Added to NRHP: March 18, 1971

Van Schaick House is a historic home located on Van Schaick Island at Cohoes in Albany County, New York. It was built about 1735 for Anthony Van Schaick (elder half-brother of Levinius Van Schaick), and is a 1 1/2-story, brick dwelling with a gambrel roof. Plans were made at the mansion for the Battle of Saratoga and the house was used by Governor Clinton as the New York State Capitol from August 22 to 25, 1777.

It was listed on the National Register of Historic Places in 1971.

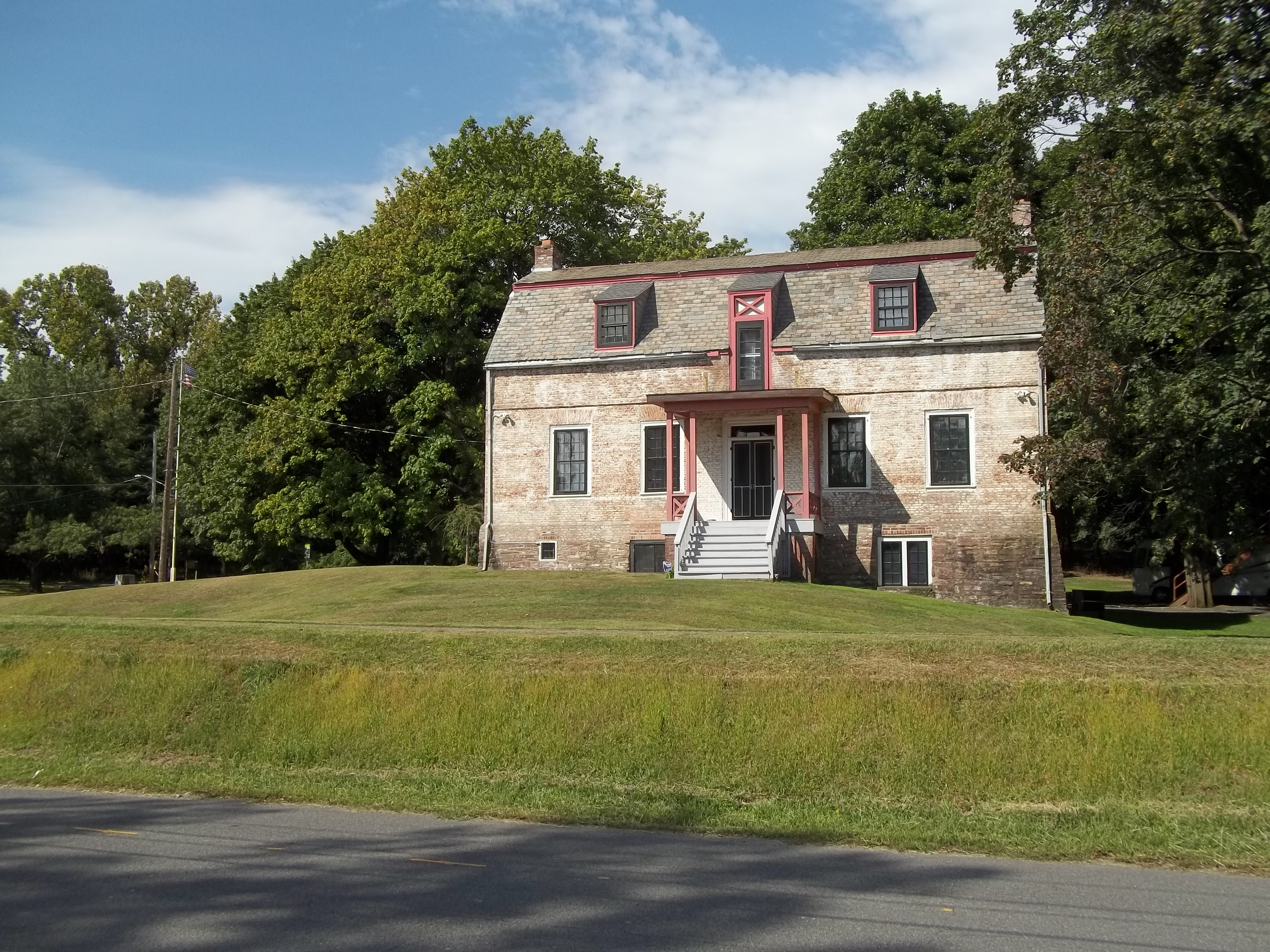

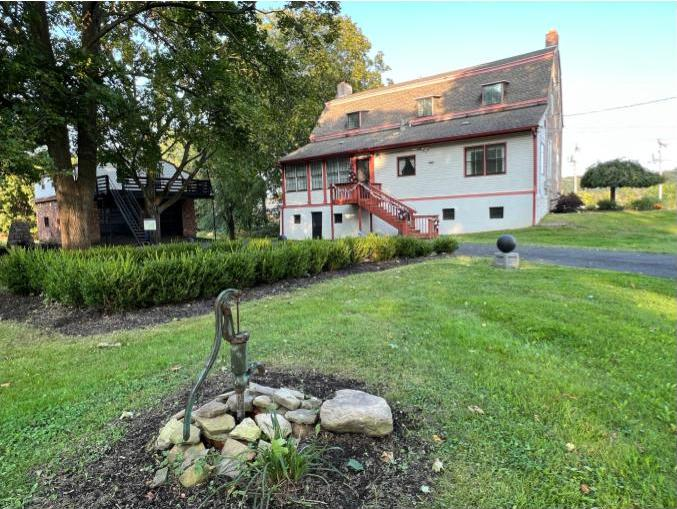
Van Schaick Mansion in Cohoes New York
