= Cohoes High School =

High school in Cohoes, New York, United States

Location
- 1 Tiger Way; Cohoes, (Albany County), New York 12047; United States
- Coordinates: 42.775440°N 73.718090°W

Information
- School type: Public school (government funded), high school
- School district: Cohoes City School District
- NCES District ID: 3607980
- Superintendent: Peggy O'Shea(Acting)
- CEEB code: 331425
- NCES School ID: 360798000569
- Principal: Laura Tarlo
- Teaching staff: 49.35 (on an FTE basis)
- Grades: 9–12
- Enrollment: 592 (2023-2024)
- Student to teacher ratio: 12.00
- Campus: Suburb: Large
- Colors: Blue and Gold
- Mascot: Tigers

Cohoes High School is a public high school located in Cohoes, Albany County, New York, U.S., and is the only high school operated by the Cohoes City School District.

== Notable alumni ==
- Theresa V. Brassard (class of 1947) – metallographer
- Aliann Pompey (class of 1995) – Olympic athlete
