= Peebles Island State Park =

State park in New York, United States

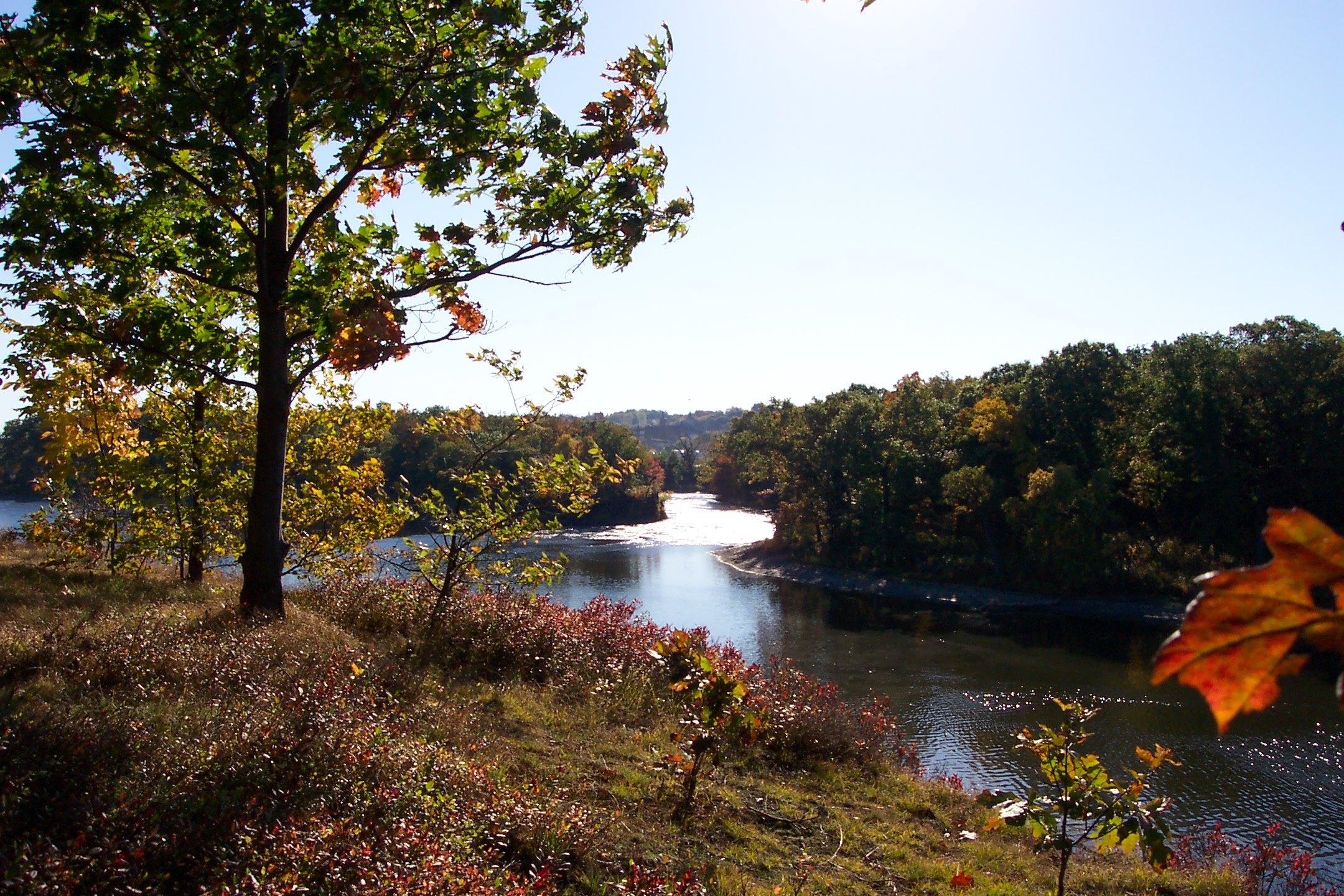
- View of the Mohawk River from Peebles Island State Park

- Location within New York
- Type: State park
- Location: 1 Delaware Avenue; Waterford, New York
- Nearest city: Waterford, New York
- Coordinates: 42°46′55″N 73°41′10″W
- Area: 190 acres (0.77 km^{2})
- Operator: New York State Office of Parks, Recreation and Historic Preservation
- Visitors: 115,344 (in 2014)
- Open: All year
- Website: Peebles Island State Park
- Peebles (Peobles) Island
- U.S. National Register of Historic Places
- U.S. Historic district
- Location within New York Location within the United States
- Location: Junction of Mohawk and Hudson rivers, Waterford, New York
- Area: 250 acres (100 ha)
- Built: 1630
- Architect: Kosciuszko, Thaddeus
- NRHP reference No.: 73001265
- Added to NRHP: October 2, 1973

Peebles Island State Park is a 190-acre (0.77 km^{2}) state park located at the confluence of the Mohawk and Hudson rivers in New York. A majority of the park is located in Saratoga County, with a smaller portion located in Albany County.

== Description ==
Peebles Island State Park includes hiking and cross-country ski trails, as well as earthworks dating from the Revolutionary War and a visitors' center detailing the island's industrial history. The park also offers picnic tables with pavilions, river views, and fishing access.

In addition to encompassing the entirety of Peebles Island, the park also includes the Matton Shipyard on neighboring Van Schaick Island in the city of Cohoes.

Headquarters for New York State's Bureau of Historic Sites as well as the Bureau of Historic Preservation Field Services are located within the park. Contained within a converted factory complex on the island known as the Peebles Island Resource Center, the headquarters serve as a home to conservators, archaeologists, historians and others tasked with preserving historic locations within New York.

== See also ==
- List of New York state parks
