= Boght Corners, New York =

Boght Corners, New York Boght
- hamlet
- Etymology: Boght: Dutch for bend, the curve of the Mohawk River; Corners: the intersection of Boght Road and US 9
- Location within New York Location within the United States
- Coordinates: 42°46′59″N 73°44′39″W
- Country: United States
- State: New York
- Region: Capital District
- County: Albany
- Town: Colonie
- Elevation: 354 ft (108 m)
- Time zone: UTC-5 (EST)
  - Summer (DST): UTC-4 (EDT)
- ZIP Code: 12047 (Cohoes)
- Area code: 518

Boght Corners (also referred to as Boght) is a hamlet in the town of Colonie in northern Albany County, New York, United States, that straddles U.S. Route 9 (Route 9). The corners that give the hamlet its name are found at the intersection of Route 9 and Boght Road (NY Route 9R on leg east of hamlet), near the Boght Community Fire District's station. The community is served by the North Colonie Central School District. Boght Hills Elementary School is located within the hamlet.

== History ==
Some of the earliest European settlements in Albany County were located in the general Boght Corners area, which is usually cited as "The Boght" or "The Boght of the Kahoos" in early colonial documents. "Boght" is a corruption of the Old Dutch word for "bay" or "bend" referring to the bend in the Mohawk River. Boght itself was a vaguely defined area north and west of the Cohoes Falls. Boght Corners was once called Groesbeck's Corners for a local family. Boght Road, which was once called Cohoes Road and Manor Avenue, was the northern boundary of the Manor of Rensselaerswyck. North of the Manor was purchased by Alice van Olinde in 1667 from the Mohawk natives, and the van Olinde family then sold and leased out farms to potential settlers. Loudon Road (today US 9), named in honor of Earl Loudon was built in 1755 for the purpose of bringing provisions north from Albany to Lake George and Fort Ticonderoga.

The first church in this area, the Reformed Dutch Church of the Boght, was established in 1781. The church, which was the first north of the city of Albany, was established on petition from the citizens of that city. The church was an offspring of the Niskayuna Reformed Church due to the common pastorate; this union of the two churches ended in 1803. The church worship was conducted in the Dutch language until the first decade of the 19th century. The church was closed by the Classis of Albany in November 2007.

Today, Boght Corners remains a largely rural area, with clusters of retail, office and residential spaces lining its roadways, separated by forests, farms and streams that feed the Mohawk River.

== Geography ==
While hamlets in New York do not have specifically demarcated borders, the corners in the name itself is from the four corners created by the intersection of Boght Road and US Route 9. Boght is generally considered to include the areas adjacent to Route 9; with the Colonie hamlet of Latham to the south, the city of Cohoes to the east, the Colonie hamlet of Dunsbach Ferry and Interstate 87 to the west, and the Colonie hamlet of Crescent Station and the Mohawk Hudson Hike/Bike Trail to the north.

== Architecture ==
The newer homes in Boght Corners include a wide range of styles including capes, bungalows, ranches, colonial, and Victorian; while homes that are 50 years or older tend to be more conservative in style.

== Education ==
Dunsbach Ferry is a part of the North Colonie Central School District (NCCS) and the children attend Boght Hills Elementary School for kindergarten through sixth grade; then Shaker Junior High School for seventh and eighth grades and Shaker High School for ninth through twelfth.
