= Albany County, New York =

County in New York, United States

- County
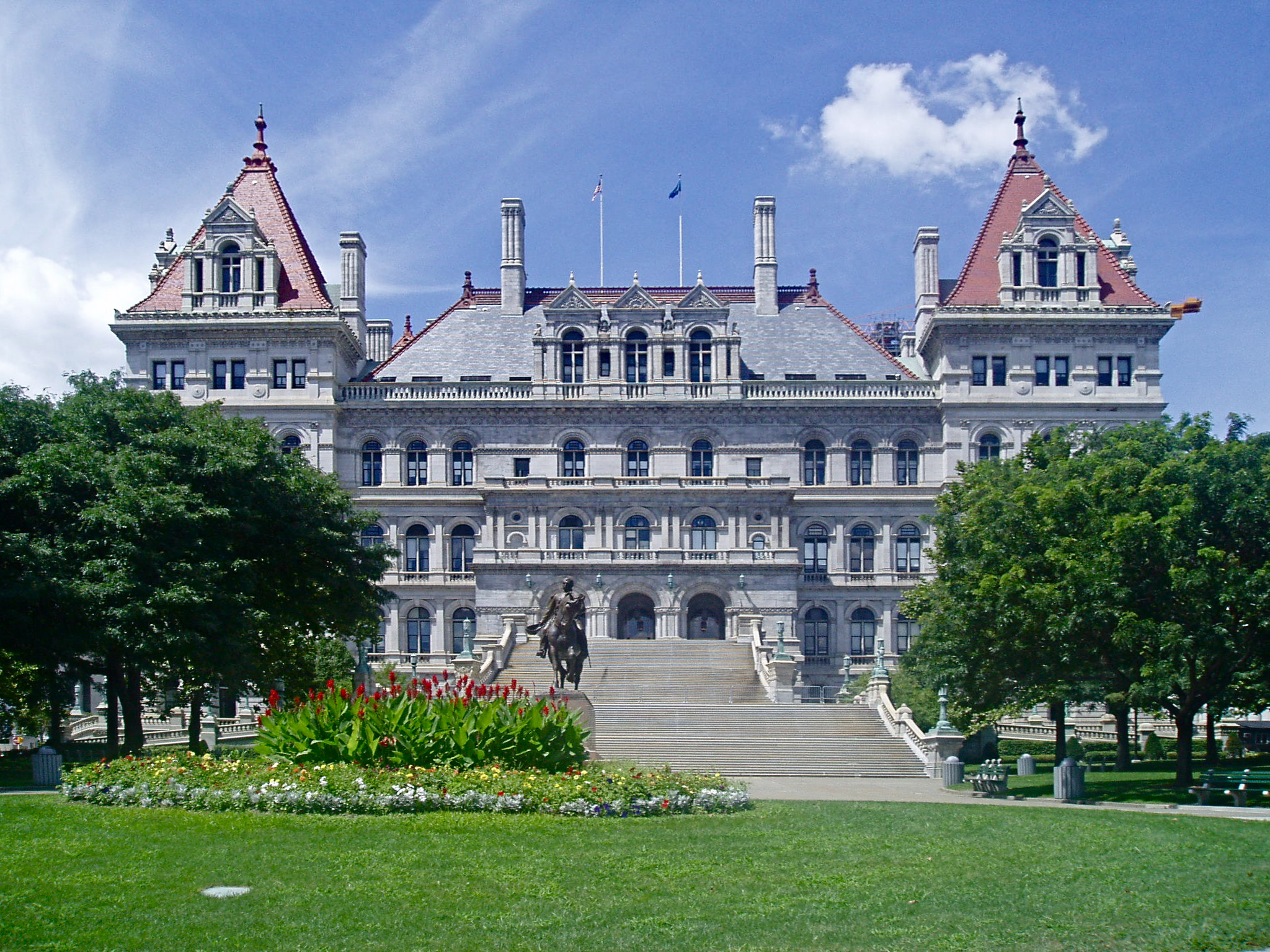
- New York State Capitol in Albany

- Flag Seal

- Location within the U.S. state of New York
- Coordinates: 42°39′44″N 73°50′57″W
- Country: United States
- State: New York
- Founded: November 1, 1683; 343 years ago (Note: "On November 1, 1683, when the State of New York was divided into ten counties, Albany was erected as one of them with an exceedingly large territory. From its area has since been taken the counties of Tryon and Charlotte, in 1772; Columbia, in 1786; Rensselaer and Saratoga, in 1791; a part of Schoharie, in 1795; a part of Greene, in 1800; and Schenectady, in 1809.")
- Named for: Prince James, Duke of York and of Albany
- Seat: Albany
- Largest city: Albany

Area
  - Total: 533 sq mi (1,380 km^{2})
  - Land: 523 sq mi (1,350 km^{2})
  - Water: 10 sq mi (26 km^{2}) 2.0%

Population (2020)
  - Total: 314,848
  - Estimate (2025): 321,225 ▲
  - Density: 602.13/sq mi (232.48/km^{2})
- Time zone: UTC−5 (Eastern)
  - Summer (DST): UTC−4 (EDT)
- Congressional district: 20th
- Website: albanycountyny.gov

Albany County (/ˈɔːlbəni/ AWL-bə-nee) is a county in the U.S. state of New York. As of the 2020 census, the population was 314,848. The county seat and largest city is Albany, which is also the state capital of New York. The county is part of the Capital District region of the state.

The county's northern border is formed by the Mohawk River, at its confluence with the Hudson River, which is to the east.

As originally established by the English government in the colonial era, Albany County had an indefinite amount of land, but has had an area of 530 square miles (1,400 km^{2}) since March 3, 1888. The county is named for the Duke of York and of Albany, who became James II of England (James VII of Scotland).

== History ==
=== Colonial ===
After England took control of the colony of New Netherland from the Dutch, Albany Shire was created on November 1, 1683, by New York Governor Thomas Dongan, and confirmed on October 1, 1691. The act creating the shire (county) vaguely defined its territory "to containe the Towns of Albany, the Collony Rensselaerwyck, Schonecteda, and all the villages, neighborhoods, and Christian Plantaçons on the east side of Hudson River from Roelef's Creek, and on the west side from Sawyer's Creek (Saugerties) to the Sarraghtoga." The confirmation declared in 1691 was similar but omitted the Town of Albany, substituted "Mannor of Ranselaerswyck" for "Collony Rensselaerwyck", and stated "to the uttermost end of Sarraghtoga" instead of just "to the Sarraghtoga". Livingston Manor was annexed to Albany County from Dutchess County in 1717.

Albany County's boundaries were defined more closely as state statutes would add land to the county, or more commonly subtract land for the formation of new counties. In 1772 with the creation of Tryon and Charlotte counties, Albany gained definitive boundaries and included what are now Albany, Columbia, Rensselaer, Saratoga, and Schenectady counties; large parts of Greene and Washington counties; and the disputed southwest corner of Vermont.

The city of Albany was the first municipality within this large county, founded as the village (dorp in Dutch) of Beverwyck by the Director-General of New Amsterdam, Pieter Stuyvesant, who also established the first court in Albany. Albany was established as a city in 1686 by Governor Dongan through the Dongan Charter after the English took over the colony. Schenectady to the west was given a patent with some municipal rights in 1684 and became a borough in 1765.

The Manor of Rensselaerswyck was created as a district within the county in 1772, and later divided into two districts, one on each side of the Hudson River in 1779. The west district included all of what is now Albany County other than lands were in the city of Albany at the time. Though the Manor of Rensselaerswyck was the only district (along with the city of Albany) in what is today Albany County, it was not the only district in what was Albany County at the time. Pittstown in 1761, and Duanesburgh in 1764, were created as townships. But when districts were created in 1772, those townships were incorporated into new districts, Pittstown in Schaghticoke and Duanesburgh into the United Districts of Duanesburgh and Schoharie. Schenectady was also made from a borough to a district in 1772. Other districts established in 1772 were Hoosick, Coxsackie, Cambridge, Saratoga, Halfmoon, Kinderhook, Kings, Claverack, Great Imboght, and the Manor of Livingston.

In a census of 1697, there were 1,452 individuals living in Albany County; two years later it would be counted as 2,016 at the beginning of King William's War. By the end of the war in 1698, the population had dropped to 1,482, but rebounded quickly and was at 2,273 by 1703. By 1723, it had increased to 6,501 and in 1731 to 8,573, which was slightly less than the population of the city of New York in the same year. In 1737, the inhabitants of Albany County would outnumber those of New York County by 17 people. In 1774, Albany County, with 42,706 people, was the largest county in colonial New York. According to the first Federal Census in 1790, Albany County reached 75,921 inhabitants and was still the state's largest county.

=== Formation of towns ===
On March 7, 1788, the state of New York divided the entire state into towns eliminating districts as administrative units by passing New York Laws of 1788, Chapters 63 and 64.

=== Timeline of boundary changes ===
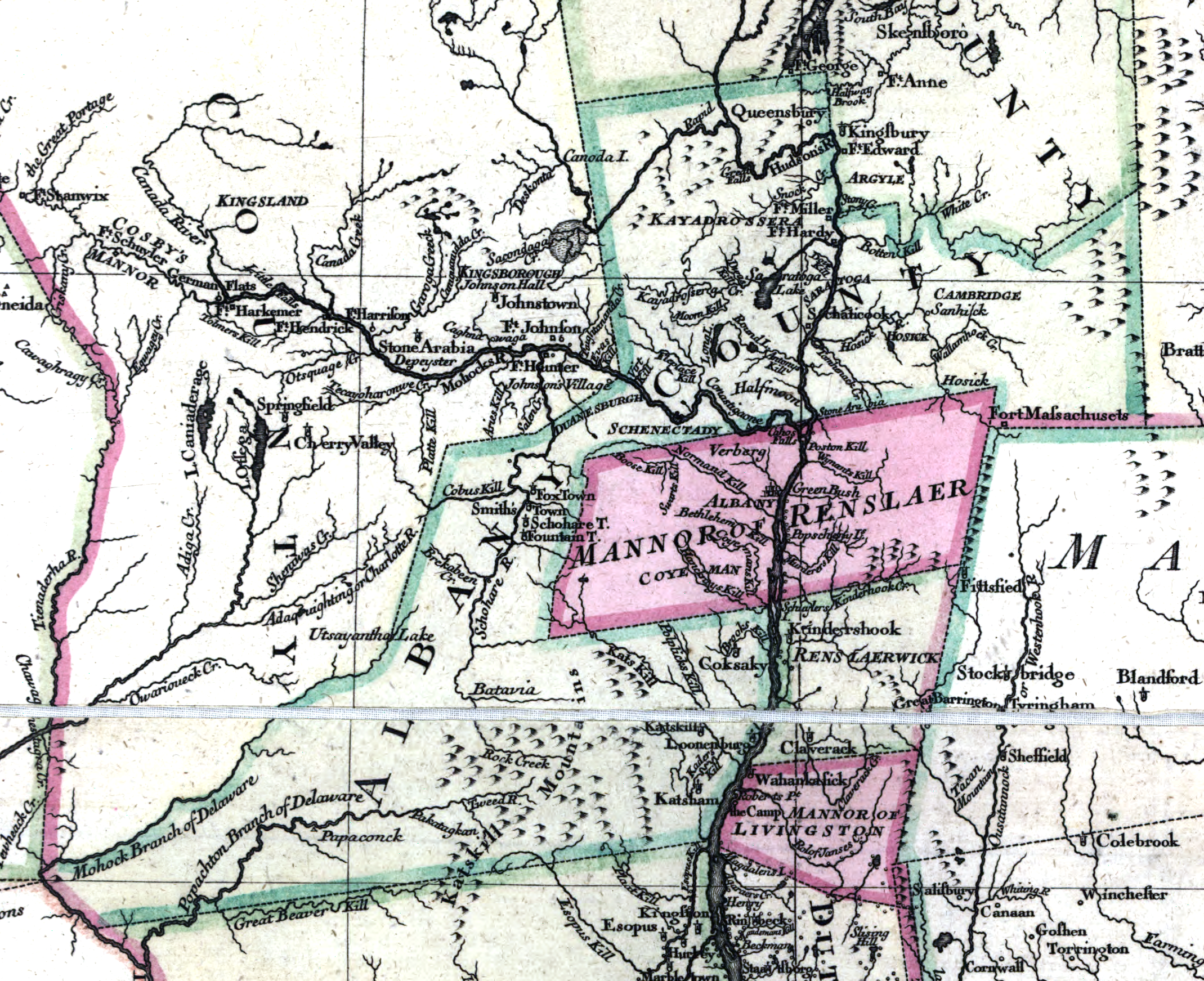
Albany County in 1777 in green

Albany County was one of the original twelve counties created by the Province of New York on November 1, 1683. At the time, it included all of New York state north of Dutchess and Ulster counties, all of what is now Bennington County in Vermont.

On May 27, 1717, Albany County was adjusted to gain an indefinite amount of land from Dutchess County and other non-county lands.

On October 7, 1763, King George III, as part of his Proclamation of 1763, created the new province of Quebec, implicitly setting the northern limit of New York at the parallel of 45 degrees north latitude from the Atlantic-St. Lawrence watershed westward to the St. Lawrence River, implicitly setting the northern limit of Albany County, but it was never mapped.

On July 20, 1764, King George III established the boundary between New Hampshire and New York along the west bank of the Connecticut River, north of Massachusetts and south of the parallel of 45 degrees north latitude. Albany County implicitly gained present-day Vermont. Although disputes occasionally broke out later, this line became the boundary between New Hampshire and Vermont, and has remained unchanged to the present. When New York refused to recognize land titles through the New Hampshire Grants (towns created earlier by New Hampshire in present Vermont), dissatisfied colonists organized in opposition, which led to the creation of independent Vermont in 1777.

On July 3, 1766, Cumberland County was partitioned from Albany County to cover all territory to the northern and eastern limits of the colony, including Windsor County, most of Windham County, and parts of Bennington and Rutland counties in present-day Vermont.

On June 26, 1767, Albany County regained all of Cumberland County.

On March 19, 1768, Albany County was re-partitioned, and Cumberland County restored.

On March 16, 1770, Albany County was again partitioned. Gloucester County was created to include all of Orange, Caledonia and Essex counties, most of Washington County, and parts of Orleans, Lamoille, Addison and Chittenden counties in present-day Vermont.

On March 12, 1772, Albany County was partitioned again, this time into the counties of Albany, Tryon (now Montgomery), and Charlotte (now Washington). This established a definite area for Albany County of 5,470 sq mi (14,200 km^{2}).

On March 24, 1772, Albany County was partitioned again, with an additional 50 square miles (130 km^{2}) handed over to Cumberland County.

On March 9, 1774, Albany County was partitioned again, this time passing 1,090 square miles (2,800 km^{2}) to Ulster County.

On April 1, 1775, Albany was again partitioned, this time giving up 60 square miles (160 km^{2}) to Charlotte County, who then exchanged this land with a like parcel in Cumberland County.

On January 15, 1777, Albany County was again partitioned, this time on account of the independence of Vermont from New York, reducing Albany County by an additional 300 square miles (780 km^{2}).

On June 26, 1781, Bennington County, Vermont, attempted to annex a portion of Albany County that today includes portions of Washington and Rensselaer counties to form what they called "The West Union". The fledgling United States – under the Articles of Confederation – arbitrated this annexation, and condemned it, resulting in Vermont ceasing the annexation on 1782-02-23.

On April 4, 1786, Columbia County was created from 650 square miles (1,700 km^{2}) of Albany County land.

On March 7, 1788, New York, refusing to recognize the independence of Vermont, and the attendant elimination of Cumberland County, attempted to adjust the line that separated Cumberland from Albany County in present-day Vermont, but to no effect.

On February 7, 1791, Albany County was partitioned again, this time to form Rensselaer and Saratoga counties. Rensselaer received 660 square miles (1,700 km^{2}), while Saratoga received 850 square miles (2,200 km^{2}). Also the town of Cambridge was transferred to Washington County. A total of 1,680 square miles (4,400 km^{2}) changed hands.

On June 1, 1795, Albany County was once again partitioned, this time losing 460 sq mi (1,200 km^{2}) to Schoharie County.

On April 5, 1798, another partition took place, with 90 square miles (230 km^{2}) passing to Ulster County.

On March 25, 1800, once again Albany County was partitioned, with 360 square miles (930 km^{2}) being used to create Greene County.

On April 3, 1801, all New York counties were redefined, with Albany County gaining 10 sq mi (26 km^{2}).

On March 7, 1809, Schenectady County was created from 230 square miles (600 km^{2}) of Albany County land, reducing Albany County to its current size.

On March 3, 1888, Albany County ceded Havre Island to Saratoga County.

== Geography ==
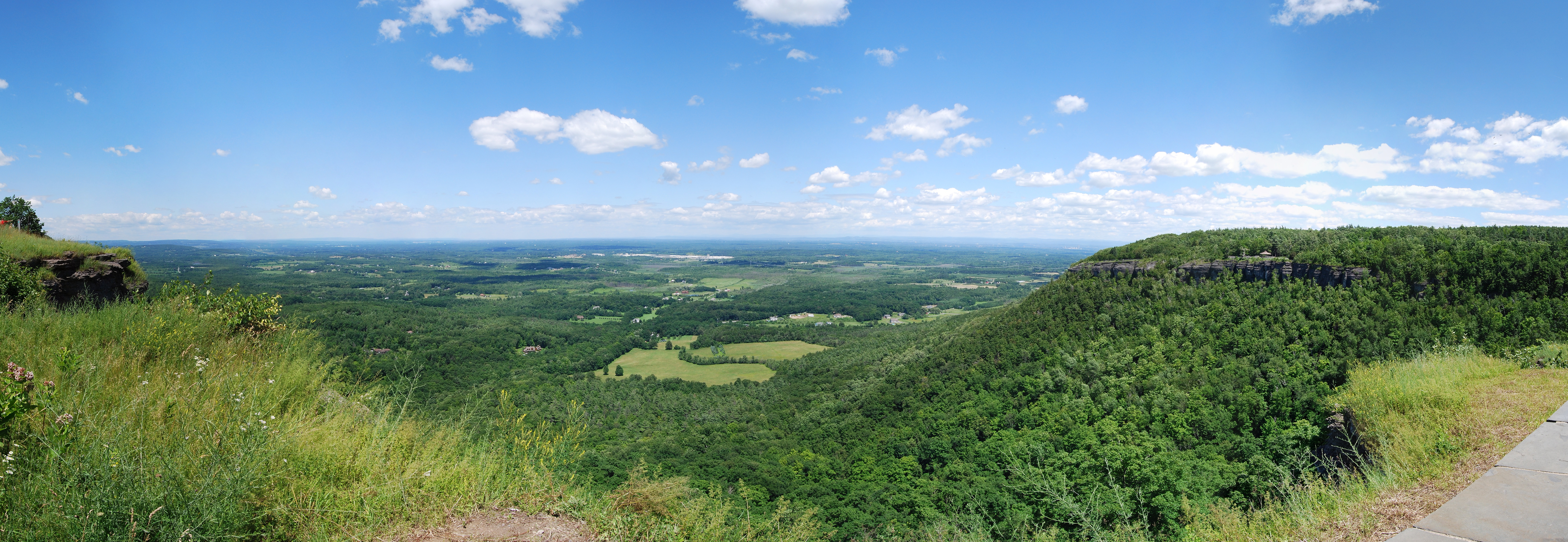
View of the towns of Guilderland and New Scotland and the city of Albany from Thacher Park

According to the U.S. Census Bureau, the county has an area of 533 square miles (1,380 km^{2}), of which 523 square miles (1,350 km^{2}) is land and 10 square miles (26 km^{2}) (2.0%) is water.

Albany County is in east central New York, extending southward and westward from where the Mohawk River joins the Hudson River. Its eastern boundary is the Hudson; a portion of its northern boundary is the Mohawk.

The terrain of the county ranges from flat near the Hudson and Mohawk Rivers to high and hilly to the southwest, of the Helderberg Escarpment and the Helderberg Mountains. The highest point is one of several summits near Henry Hill at approximately 2,160 feet (660 m) above sea level; The lowest point is 62 feet (19 m) above sea level at the Hudson River's southernmost extent in the county.

=== Climate ===
Albany

Climate chart (precipitation, max. and min. temperature)
J	F	M	A	M	J	J	A	S	O	N	D
2.7 31 13	2.3 34 16	3.2 45 25	3.3 57 36	3.7 70 47	3.8 78 55	3.5 82 60	3.7 80 58	3.3 71 50	3.2 60 39	3.3 48 31	2.8 36 20
- █ Average max. and min. temperatures in °F
- █ Precipitation totals in inches
- Source: ustravelweather.com
Metric conversion
J	F	M	A	M	J	J	A	S	O	N	D
69 0 −10	58 1 −9	81 7 −4	83 14 2	93 21 8	95 25 13	89 28 16	93 27 15	84 22 10	82 15 4	84 9 −1	70 2 −7
- █ Average max. and min. temperatures in °C
- █ Precipitation totals in mm

The Capital District has a humid continental climate, with cold, snowy winters, and hot, wet summers. Albany receives around 36.2 inches (920 mm) of rain per year, with 135 days of at least 0.01 inches (0.25 mm) of precipitation. Snowfall is significant, totaling about 63 inches (1,600 mm) annually, but with less accumulation than the lake-effect areas to the north and west, being far enough from Lake Ontario. Albany County is however, close enough to the coast to receive heavy snow from Nor'easters, and the region gets the bulk of its yearly snowfall from these types of storms. The county also occasionally receives Alberta clippers. Winters are often very cold with fluctuating conditions, temperatures often drop to below 0 °F (−18 °C) at night. Summers in the Albany can contain stretches of excessive heat and humidity, with temperatures above 90 °F (32 °C) and dew points near 70. Severe thunderstorms are common but tornadoes are rare. Albany receives on average per year 69 sunny days, 111 partly cloudy days, and 185 cloudy days; and an average, over the course of a year, of less than four hours of sunshine per day, with just over an average of 2.5 hours per day over the course of the winter. The chance during daylight hours of sunshine is 53%, with the highest percentage of sunny daylight hours being in July with 64%, and the lowest month is November with 37%.

=== Adjacent counties ===
Albany County is bordered by six counties. Listed clockwise, they are:

- Schenectady County – northwest
- Saratoga County – north
- Rensselaer County – east
- Columbia County – southeast
- Greene County – south
- Schoharie County – west

== Cityscape ==
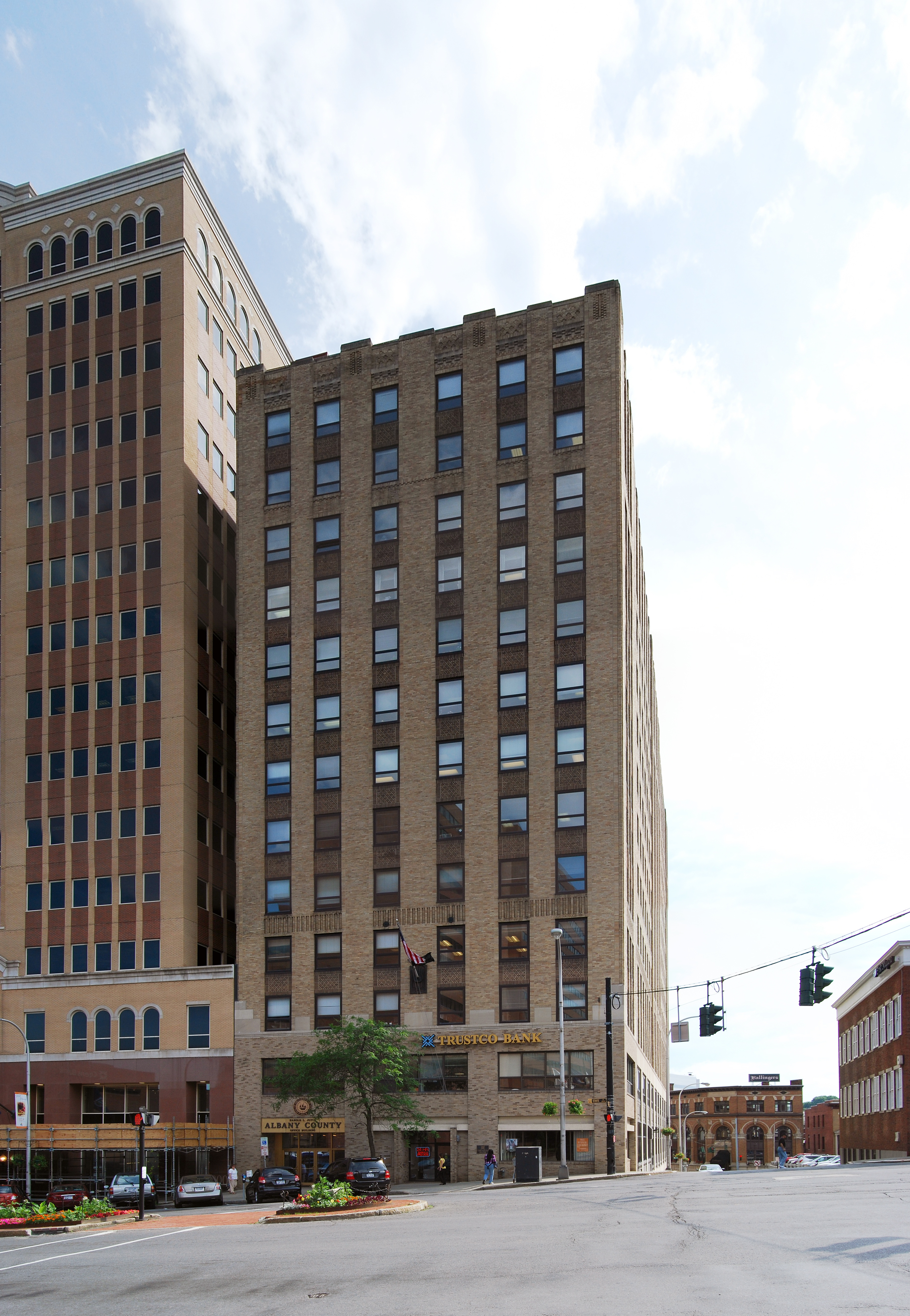
Albany County office building on State Street in Albany

=== Architecture ===
Albany County has myriad different architectural styles spanning centuries of development. Within the city of Albany alone there is Dutch Colonial (the Quackenbush House), French Renaissance (the New York State Capitol), Federal style (the original Albany Academy in Academy Park), Romanesque Revival (Albany City Hall), Art deco (the Alfred E. Smith Building), and Modern (Empire State Plaza). The cities of Albany, Cohoes, and Watervliet and the village of Green Island are more urban in architecture; while the towns of Colonie, Guilderland, New Scotland, and Bethlehem more suburban and the remaining Hilltowns (Berne, Knox, Westerlo, and Rensselaerville) very rural.

=== Parks ===
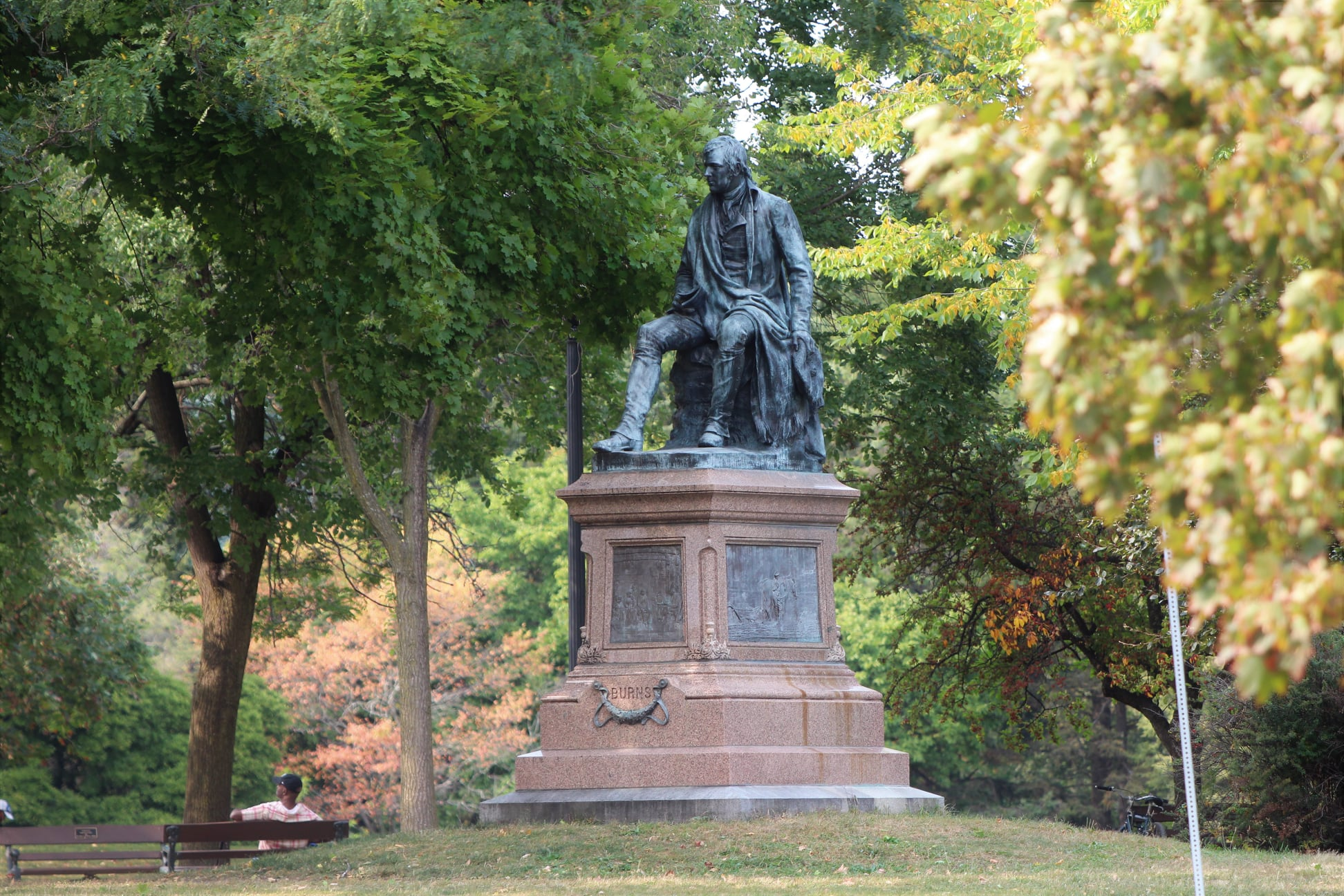
A bronze statue of the famous Scottish poet Robert Burns sculpted by Charles Calverley in 1888. This structure is located in the Washington Park neighborhood of Albany, New York.

Albany County is home to the Emma Treadwell Thacher Nature Center, which opened in July 2001 and is near the shore of Thompson's Lake between the two state parks that are in Albany County- Thompson's Lake State Park and John Boyd Thacher State Park. There are also state-owned nature preserves with interactive educational programs such as the Five Rivers Environmental Education Center and the Albany Pine Bush. The cities, towns, and villages of Albany County have many municipal parks, playgrounds, and protected green areas. Washington Park in the city of Albany and The Crossing in the town of Colonie are two of the largest. There are many small hiking and biking trails and longer distance bike-hike trails such the Mohawk-Hudson Bike-Hike Trail which goes from the city of Albany north to Cohoes and then west along the Mohawk River to Schenectady County.

=== Festivals ===
One of the largest events in Albany County is the Tulip Fest held in the city of Albany every spring at Washington Park. The tradition stems from when Mayor Erastus Corning 2nd had a city ordinance passed declaring the tulip as Albany's official flower on July 1, 1948. The African-American tradition of Pinksterfest, whose origins are traced back even further to Dutch festivities, was later incorporated into the Tulip Fest. The Albany LatinFest has been held since 1996 and drew 10,000 to Washington Park in 2008. PolishFest is a three-day celebration of Polish culture in the Capital District, held in the town of Colonie for the past eight years.

=== Amusement ===
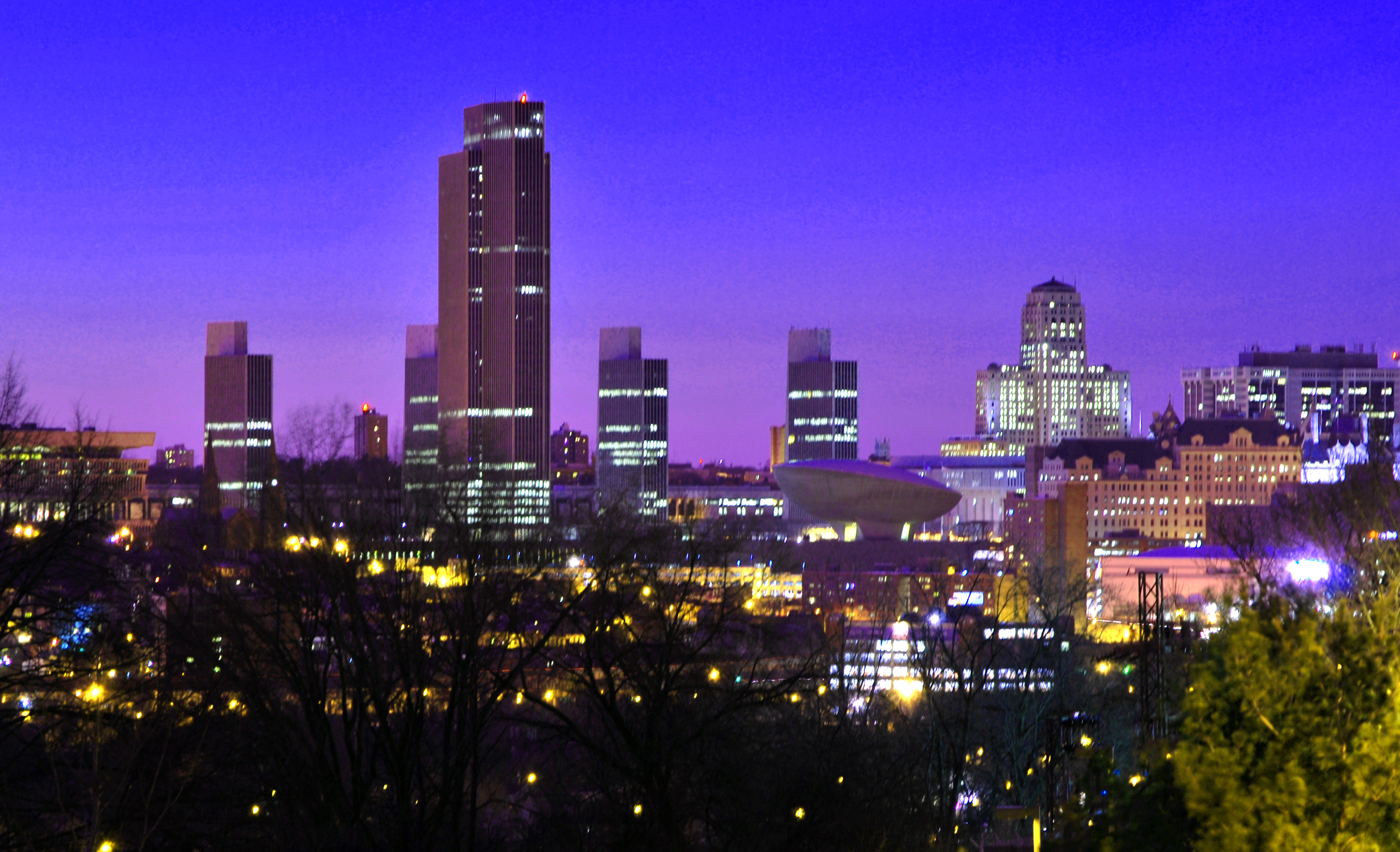
Albany, the county's seat and largest city

Albany County has two shopping malls classified as super-regional malls (malls with over 800,000 sq ft), Crossgates Mall in Guilderland and Colonie Center in Colonie with over one million square feet of rentable space in each. Huck Finn's Playland is a children's amusement park open during the summer, which started operations in the Summer of 2015—after purchasing the rides from the former Hoffman's Playland in Newtonville, which was in operation from 1951 to the Fall of 2014. During the winter there are over 18 miles (29 km) of official trails for snowshoeing at the Albany Pine Bush Preserve, in the city of Albany and towns of Colonie and Guilderland.

=== Museums ===
Albany County has many historical sites and museums covering a wide range of topics and time periods. The Albany Institute of History and Art, founded in 1791, is one of the oldest museums in the United States, and the New York State Museum is the country's oldest and largest state museum. Many of the museums are historical sites themselves, such as Cherry Hill, the Ten Broeck Mansion, and the Schuyler Mansion in the city of Albany and the Pruyn House in Colonie. The Quackenbush House is the second oldest house in Albany and part of the Albany Heritage Area Visitors Center, which includes a planetarium. The Albany Pine Bush Discovery Center in Albany includes hands-on activities to learn about the unique Pine Bush Barrens of the Albany, Guilderland, and Colonie. Covering the history of pharmacy is the Throop Drug Store Museum at the Albany College of Pharmacy. The USS Slater, DE-766 is a World War II Destroyer Escort, the last floating Destroyer Escort, owned by the Destroyer Escort Historical Museum is moored from Spring to Fall at the foot of Quay Street in the Hudson River. The ship is open for tours each week and has a well-maintained collection of World War II US Naval artifacts.

There are several art museums in Albany County: the Albany Center Gallery, in downtown Albany, which exhibits works by local artists within a 100-mile (160 km) radius of that city; the University Art Museum, at the University at Albany, SUNY; and the Opalka Gallery, at the Sage College of Albany. The Empire State Plaza in Albany has one of the most important state collections of modern art in the U.S.

=== Performing arts ===
Albany County itself owns the largest venue for performing arts in the county, the Times Union Center, which was originally built as the Knickerbocker Arena; it opened on January 30, 1990, with a performance by Frank Sinatra. In 1996, The Grateful Dead released a concert album from their March 1990 performances titled Dozin' at the Knick.

=== Sports ===
Many athletes and coaches in major sports have begun their careers in Albany County. Phil Jackson, former NBA head coach of the Chicago Bulls and Los Angeles Lakers won his first championship ring as a coach when he guided the Albany Patroons to the 1984 CBA championship. Three years later, the Patroons completed a 50–6 regular season, including winning all 28 of their home games; at that time, Sacramento Kings head coach George Karl was the Patroons' head coach. Future NBA stars Mario Elie and Vincent Askew were part of that season's squad. Mike Tyson received his early training in the Capital District and his first professional fight was in Albany in 1985 and Tyson's first televised fight was in Troy in 1986. He fought professionally four times in Albany and twice each in Troy and Glens Falls between 1985 and 1986.

Since 1988, the Siena College men's basketball team (the Siena Saints) have appeared in six NCAA Tournaments (1989, 1999, 2002, 2008, 2009, and 2010).

=== Religious life ===
Albany County was originally settled primarily by Protestants from northern Europe: the Netherlands, British Isles, and Germany. In the 19th century it was a destination for many Catholic immigrants, first from Ireland—fleeing the Great Famine—and later from southern Germany and central and southern Europe. Late 19th- and early 20th-century immigrants included Jews from eastern Europe. In addition to other Jewish congregations, the county has one of the few Karaite Jewish communities outside Israel. This community is active and has its own synagogue. The Albany Metro Area has consistently been found to be among the highest ranking postchristian cities in the US.

== Demographics ==
Historical population
Census	Pop.	Note	%±
1790	75,980		—
1800	34,043		−55.2%
1810	34,661		1.8%
1820	38,116		10.0%
1830	53,520		40.4%
1840	68,593		28.2%
1850	93,279		36.0%
1860	113,917		22.1%
1870	133,052		16.8%
1880	154,890		16.4%
1890	164,555		6.2%
1900	165,571		0.6%
1910	173,666		4.9%
1920	186,106		7.2%
1930	211,953		13.9%
1940	221,315		4.4%
1950	239,386		8.2%
1960	272,926		14.0%
1970	286,742		5.1%
1980	285,909		−0.3%
1990	292,594		2.3%
2000	294,565		0.7%
2010	304,204		3.3%
2020	314,848		3.5%
2025 (est.)	321,225	▲	2.0%
U.S. Decennial Census; 1790–1960 1900–1990; 1990–2000 2010–2019

=== 2020 census ===
Albany County, New York – Racial and ethnic composition Note: the US Census treats Hispanic/Latino as an ethnic category. This table excludes Latinos from the racial categories and assigns them to a separate category. Hispanics/Latinos may be of any race.
Race / Ethnicity (NH = Non-Hispanic)	Pop 1980	Pop 1990	Pop 2000	Pop 2010	Pop 2020	% 1980	% 1990	% 2000	% 2010	% 2020
White alone (NH)	260,859	257,512	240,913	231,152	210,895	91.24%	88.01%	81.79%	75.99%	66.98%
Black or African American alone (NH)	18,540	24,068	31,514	36,396	40,667	6.48%	8.23%	10.70%	11.96%	12.92%
Native American or Alaska Native alone (NH)	327	504	487	453	494	0.11%	0.17%	0.17%	0.15%	0.16%
Asian alone (NH)	2,407	4,869	8,022	14,500	24,363	0.84%	1.66%	2.72%	4.77%	7.74%
Native Hawaiian or Pacific Islander alone (NH)	x	x	72	88	166	x	x	0.02%	0.03%	0.05%
Other race alone (NH)	751	330	434	569	1,821	0.26%	0.11%	0.15%	0.19%	0.58%
Mixed race or Multiracial (NH)	x	x	4,044	6,129	14,847	x	x	1.37%	2.01%	4.72%
Hispanic or Latino (any race)	3,025	5,311	9,079	14,917	21,595	1.06%	1.82%	3.08%	4.90%	6.86%
Total	285,909	292,594	294,565	304,204	314,848	100.00%	100.00%	100.00%	100.00%	100.00%

As of the 2020 US Census, there were 314,848 people in 126,540 households residing in the county. The population density was 563 inhabitants per square mile (217/km^{2}). There were 134,072 housing units at an average density of 248 units per square mile (96/km^{2}). The racial makeup of the county was 78.2% White, 12.7% Black or African American, 0.2% Native American, 4.8% Asian, 0.0% Pacific Islander, 1.6% from other races, and 2.5% from two or more races. 4.9% of the population were Hispanic or Latino of any race. 19.2% were of Irish, 16.0% Italian, 11.0% German, 6.1% English and 5.1% Polish ancestry according to Census 2000. 90.4% spoke English, 2.7% Spanish and 1.0% Italian as their first language.

There were 124,682 households, out of which 28.9% had children under the age of 18 living with them, 43.2% were married couples living together, 12.2% had a female householder with no husband present, and 41.1% were non-families. 33.0% of all households were made up of individuals, and 11.3% had someone living alone who was 65 years of age or older. The average household size was 2.32 and the average family size was 2.99.

In the county, the age distribution of the population shows 22.6% under the age of 18, 11.3% from 18 to 24, 28.8% from 25 to 44, 22.8% from 45 to 64, and 14.5% who were 65 years of age or older. The median age was 37 years. For every 100 females there were 91.7 males. For every 100 females age 18 and over, there were 87.8 males.

The median income for a household in the county was $42,935, and the median income for a family was $56,724. Males had a median income of $39,838 versus $30,127 for females. The per capita income for the county was $23,345. About 7.2% of families and 13.1% of the population were below the poverty line, including 14.9% of those under age 18 and 6.3% of those age 65 or over.

== Economy ==
=== Tech Valley ===
Since the 2000s, the economy of Albany County and the surrounding Capital District has been redirected toward high technology. Tech Valley is a marketing name for the eastern part of New York State, encompassing Albany County, the Capital District, and the Hudson Valley. Originated in 1998 to promote the greater Albany area as a high-tech competitor to regions such as Silicon Valley and Boston, it has since grown to represent the counties in the Capital District and extending to IBM's Westchester County plants in the south and the Canada–US border to the north. The area's high technology ecosystem is supported by technologically focused academic institutions including Rensselaer Polytechnic Institute and the State University of New York Polytechnic Institute. Tech Valley encompasses 19 counties straddling both sides of the Adirondack Northway and the New York Thruway, and with heavy state taxpayer subsidy, has experienced significant growth in the computer hardware side of the high-technology industry, with great strides in the nanotechnology sector, digital electronics design, and water- and electricity-dependent integrated microchip circuit manufacturing.

== Government and politics ==
For most of its history, Albany County has predominantly backed Democratic Party presidential candidates. In only three elections since 1924 has a Republican Party candidate carried the county in a presidential election, the most recent being Richard Nixon in 1972. The Democratic Party dominance has become more pronounced in recent years, with George H. W. Bush in 1988 the most recent Republican candidate to win even forty percent of the county's vote.

United States presidential election results for Albany County, New York
Year	Republican		Democratic		Third party(ies)	
Year	No.	%	No.	%	No.	%
1884	17,698	47.40%	18,343	49.13%	1,295	3.47%
1888	19,362	47.39%	21,037	51.49%	454	1.11%
1892	18,398	47.46%	18,994	48.99%	1,376	3.55%
1896	22,263	54.52%	17,818	43.64%	753	1.84%
1900	23,495	54.96%	18,752	43.86%	505	1.18%
1904	24,964	56.13%	18,768	42.20%	746	1.68%
1908	24,763	55.93%	18,732	42.31%	782	1.77%
1912	20,418	47.47%	17,235	40.07%	5,362	12.47%
1916	26,628	58.00%	18,799	40.95%	485	1.06%
1920	48,750	61.72%	28,376	35.92%	1,863	2.36%
1924	48,253	52.01%	38,671	41.68%	5,848	6.30%
1928	48,762	42.99%	62,380	54.99%	2,295	2.02%
1932	46,244	38.29%	73,194	60.61%	1,321	1.09%
1936	52,962	41.54%	71,631	56.18%	2,918	2.29%
1940	58,912	43.26%	77,052	56.58%	210	0.15%
1944	60,543	45.88%	71,128	53.90%	289	0.22%
1948	59,965	42.61%	75,419	53.59%	5,350	3.80%
1952	79,871	52.28%	72,633	47.54%	266	0.17%
1956	86,202	56.64%	65,982	43.36%	0	0.00%
1960	61,600	40.08%	91,973	59.84%	119	0.08%
1964	32,224	21.90%	114,827	78.03%	101	0.07%
1968	52,948	38.00%	80,724	57.93%	5,679	4.08%
1972	81,848	54.76%	67,297	45.02%	330	0.22%
1976	69,592	48.87%	71,616	50.29%	1,201	0.84%
1980	52,354	36.27%	74,429	51.56%	17,581	12.18%
1984	74,542	49.50%	75,447	50.10%	603	0.40%
1988	59,534	40.37%	86,564	58.70%	1,363	0.92%
1992	49,452	31.83%	80,641	51.90%	25,270	16.27%
1996	39,785	28.22%	85,993	60.99%	15,213	10.79%
2000	47,624	33.53%	85,644	60.30%	8,765	6.17%
2004	54,872	37.28%	89,323	60.68%	3,004	2.04%
2008	50,586	34.35%	93,937	63.79%	2,743	1.86%
2012	45,064	33.19%	87,556	64.49%	3,147	2.32%
2016	47,808	34.19%	83,071	59.41%	8,939	6.39%
2020	51,081	33.15%	99,474	64.55%	3,547	2.30%
2024	54,560	36.45%	92,589	61.86%	2,528	1.69%

Albany County was governed by a board of supervisors until 1968. The board consisted of the town supervisors of each town in the county, as well as county supervisors elected from the wards of each city in the county. In the later years of its existence, the board used a system of weighted voting to comply with recently enacted federal and state proportional representation requirements. On January 1, 1976, Albany County government was changed by a new charter establishing a county executive elected at-large, in addition to the 39-seat county legislature. In the first election for county executive, Democratic nominee James J. Coyne Jr., who was then serving as county clerk, defeated Liberal nominee Theresa Cooke, county treasurer and a critic of the county and city Democratic machine run by Daniel P. O'Connell, and Republican nominee Almerin C. O'Hara, former state Commissioner of the Office of General Services. Each of the 39 legislators are elected from single-member districts. As of 2023, the county legislature has 29 Democrats, 10 Republicans.

The County Executive is Daniel P. McCoy. Other officials elected countywide include District Attorney Lee Kindlon, Clerk Bruce A. Hidley, Comptroller Susan A. Rizzo, and Sheriff Craig D. Apple. All county officials are Democrats. Other elected officials with districts in the county include:

- State Assembly
  - Christopher Tague, Republican, 102nd District
  - John McDonald, Democratic, 108th District
  - Gabriella Romero, Democratic, 109th District
  - Phillip Steck, Democratic, 110th District
  - Angelo Santabarbara, Democratic, 111th District
- State Senate
  - Patricia Fahy, Democratic, 46th District
  - Jacob Ashby, Republican, 43rd District
- United States House of Representatives
  - Paul Tonko, Democratic, 20th District

Albany County Legislature
District	Legislator	Party	Residence
1	Carolyn McLaughlin	Democratic	Albany
2	Merton D. Simpson	Democratic	Albany
3	Wanda Willingham, Deputy Chair	Democratic	Albany
4	Mark Robinson	Democratic	Albany
5	Susan Pedo	Democratic	Albany
6	Dannielle Hille	Democratic	Albany
7	Beroro T. Efekoro	Democratic	Albany
8	Lynne Lekakis	Democratic	Albany
9	Andrew Joyce	Democratic	Albany
10	Gary W. Domalewicz	Democratic	Albany
11	Frank J. Commisso	Democratic	Albany
12	Danielle Gillespie	Democratic	Albany
13	Raymond F. Joyce	Democratic	Albany
14	Tim Lane	Democratic	Loudonville
15	Robert J. Beston	Democratic	Watervliet
16	Maggie Alix	Democratic	Green Island
17	Bill Ricard	Democratic	Cohoes
18	Gilbert F. Ethier	Democratic	Cohoes
19	Todd A. Drake	Republican	Latham
20	David B. Mayo	Democratic	Latham
21	Kenneth Weafer	Democratic	Latham
22	Susan Quine-Laurilliard	Democratic	Colonie
23	Paul J. Burgdorf	Republican	Colonie
24	Ellen Rosano	Democratic	Loudonville
25	Ryan Conway	Republican	Loudonville
26	Patrice Lockart	Republican	Colonie
27	Frank A. Mauriello, Minority Leader	Republican	Colonie
28	Mark E. Grimm	Republican	Guilderland
29	Dennis A. Feeney, Majority Leader	Democratic	Guilderland
30	Dustin M. Reidy	Democratic	Westmere
31	Jeff S. Perlee	Republican	Knox
32	Mickey Cleary	Democratic	Guilderland
33	William Reinhardt	Democratic	Slingerlands
34	Joanne Cunningham, Chair	Democratic	Delmar
35	Jeffrey D. Kuhn	Democratic	Glenmont
36	Matthew J. Miller	Democratic	Selkirk
37	Zach Collins	Republican	Coeymans
38	Victoria Plotsky	Democratic	Clarksville
39	Christopher H. Smith	Republican	Berne

Albany County Executives
Name	Party	Term
James J. Coyne Jr.	Democratic	January 1, 1976 – December 31, 1991
Michael J. Hoblock Jr.	Republican	January 1, 1992 – December 31, 1994
Michael G. Breslin	Democratic	January 1, 1995 – December 31, 2011
Daniel P. McCoy	Democratic	January 1, 2012 – present

== Law enforcement ==
The Albany County Sheriff's Office is one of the oldest law enforcement agencies in the United States, having been established in the 1660s. Sheriff Craig Apple was first elected in 2011.

The sheriff is also responsible for the county jail, which was built in 1931, and renamed from the Albany County Correctional Facility to the Albany County Corrections and Rehabilitative Services Center in 2019. It has a contract with New York City to accept prisoners from its facilities. The New York Times has reported that juveniles sent to Albany were beaten and placed in isolation, which is forbidden in New York City.

The department investigated a criminal complaint against Governor Andrew Cuomo during the Andrew Cuomo sexual harassment allegations, and filed a misdemeanor criminal complaint on its own authority to bring charges.

== Education ==
=== Tertiary ===
- Albany College of Pharmacy
- Albany Law School
- Albany Medical College
- Bryant & Stratton College
- SUNY Empire State University - Latham campus
- Excelsior College
- The College of Saint Rose (closed in 2024)
- Sage College of Albany
- Sage Graduate School
- Siena College
- State University of New York at Albany

=== K-12 education ===
Public school districts include:

- Albany City School District
- Berne-Knox-Westerlo Central School District
- Bethlehem Central School District
- Cairo-Durham Central School District
- Cohoes City School District
- Duanesburg Central School District
- Green Island Union Free School District
- Greenville Central School District
- Guilderland Central School District
- Menands Union Free School District
- Middleburgh Central School District
- Niskayuna Central School District
- North Colonie Central School District
- Ravena-Coeymans-Selkirk Central Schools
- Rotterdam-Mohonasen Central School District
- Schalmont Central School District
- Schoharie Central School District
- South Colonie Central School District
- Voorheesville Central School District
- Watervliet City School District

== Transportation ==
Albany County has long been at the forefront of transportation technology from the days of turnpikes and plank roads to the Erie Canal, from the first passenger railroad in the state to the oldest municipal airport in the United States. Today, Interstates, Amtrak, and the Albany International Airport continue to make the Albany County a major crossroads of the Northeastern United States.

The Capital District Transportation Committee (CDTC) is the Metropolitan Planning Organization (MPO) for the Albany-Schenectady-Troy Metropolitan Statistical Area (MSA). Every metropolitan area in the United States with a population of over 50,000 must have a MPO in order to get any federal transportation funding. The US Department of Transportation (USDOT) uses an MPO to make decisions on what projects are most important to a metro area for immediate versus long term funding. The USDOT will not approve federal funds for transportation projects unless they are on an MPO's list.

=== Interstate and other major highways ===
Albany County is at a major crossroads of the Northeastern United States, first formed by the Mohawk and Hudson rivers. Even before the Interstate Highway System and the U.S. Highway system, Albany County was the hub of many turnpikes and plank roads that connected the region, as well as the Erie Canal reaching the Great Lakes.

Today, Interstate 87 and Interstate 90 meet in Albany County. The Thomas E. Dewey New York State Thruway is a toll-road that from Exit 24 in the city of Albany is I-87 and travels south to connect the county with downstate New York. West from Exit 24, the Thruway is I-90 and connects the county with Schenectady, Utica, Syracuse, Rochester, and Buffalo.

North of Exit 24, I-87 is the Adirondack Northway and connects the city and county of Albany with their suburbs in Saratoga County and provides long-distance travel to Montreal. East of Exit 24, I-90 travels along the northern boundary of the city of Albany and exits the county on the Patroon Island Bridge into Rensselaer County to access Albany's eastern suburbs. Interstate 787 connects the Thruway (I-87) to Downtown Albany, Menands, Watervliet, and Cohoes. U.S. Route 9 enters the county on the Dunn Memorial Bridge and travels through the city of Albany north, connecting it with the suburbs in the Colonie and Saratoga County. U.S. Route 20 also enters the county on the Dunn Memorial Bridge and travels west through Albany (city) and the Town of Guilderland. New York State Route 5 and New York State Route 7 are two important highways that bisect the county and are developed as important shopping strips.

=== Mass transit ===
Albany County is served by the Capital District Transportation Authority, a five-county bus service that also serves Rensselaer, Schenectady, Montgomery and Saratoga counties. Greyhound Lines, Trailways, and Peter Pan Bus Lines buses all serve a downtown terminal. Chinatown bus lines leaves from Central Avenue and provide service to Chinatown, Manhattan.

=== Airports ===
Albany International Airport is the only commercial airport in the county. Destinations for flights out of Albany include Atlanta; Las Vegas; Chicago; Charlotte, North Carolina; and Orlando, Florida, among many others.

=== Rail ===
Since 1968 when Union Station in the city of Albany was abandoned for a new station across the Hudson in the city of Rensselaer, Albany County has been without a train station. Amtrak has several routes serving the Albany-Rensselaer Station. The Adirondack (north to Montreal, Quebec and south to the city of New York), Empire Service (west to Buffalo and Niagara Falls, south to New York), Ethan Allen Express (northeast to Rutland, Vermont and south to New York), Maple Leaf (west to Toronto and south to New York), and the Lake Shore Limited (at Albany-Rensselaer separate routes from Boston and New York merge to one train west to Chicago, on way east one train splits to two, one east to Boston and another south to New York).

== Communities ==
Map of towns, cities and villages within Albany County

Albany County is composed of three cities and 10 towns.

=== Cities ===
- Albany (county seat)
- Cohoes
- Watervliet

=== Towns ===
- Berne
- Bethlehem
- Coeymans
- Colonie
- Green Island
- Guilderland
- Knox
- New Scotland
- Rensselaerville
- Westerlo

=== Villages ===
- Altamont
- Colonie
- Green Island
- Menands
- Ravena
- Voorheesville

=== Census-designated places ===
- Latham
- Loudonville
- Preston-Potter Hollow
- Roessleville
- Siena College
- Westmere

=== Hamlets ===
- Alcove
- Boght Corners
- Clarksville
- Coeymans
- Crescent Station
- Delmar
- Dunsbach Ferry
- Elsmere
- Feura Bush
- Fort Hunter
- Fullers
- Glenmont
- Guilderland
- Guilderland Center
- Karner
- Lisha Kill
- Mannsville
- McKownville
- Medusa
- New Salem
- Newtonville
- Normansville
- Selkirk
- Slingerlands
- South Bethlehem
- Verdoy
- Wemple
- West Albany

== See also ==
- Albany Health and Human Services Corporation
- Albany County Sheriff's Department
- List of counties in New York
- List of people associated with Albany County, New York
- National Register of Historic Places listings in Albany County, New York
