= McKownville, New York =

- Hamlet
- Location within New York Location within the United States
- Coordinates: 42°40′45″N 73°50′02″W
- Country: United States
- State: New York
- Region: Capital District
- County: Albany
- Town: Guilderland
- Settled: late 18th century
- Named for: John McKown and family, early settlers from the late 18th century
- Elevation: 249 ft (76 m)

Population (1993 (appr.))
  - Total: 2,756
- Time zone: UTC-5 (EST)
  - Summer (DST): UTC-4 (EDT)
- ZIP Code: 12203 (Albany)
- Area code: 518

McKownville is a hamlet in the town of Guilderland, Albany County, New York, United States. It lies along the eastern border of the town with the city of Albany. McKownville is a heavily developed suburb of Albany and is home to many strip malls, shopping centers, and a portion of the University at Albany, SUNY and is bisected by U.S. Route 20 (Western Avenue). McKownville is named for John McKown and family, early settlers from the late 18th century.

== History ==
In the 18th century the King's Highway, a series of paths through the Pine Bush pine barrens from Albany to Schenectady, passed through what would later become McKownville. In the late 1740s, John McKown, originally from Scotland, moved his family to the United States of America from County Londonderry, Ireland. (Note: County Londonderry is today in Northern Ireland, a part of the United Kingdom (UK). At the time John McKown lived there it was part of the Kingdom of Ireland, which was in personal union with the UK.) He leased the Five Mile Tavern along the King's Highway, near the present-day Indian Quad of the University at Albany, SUNY.

In 1790, his son William built a tavern at the corners of what would later be Fuller Road and Western Avenue. The first post office (1884) was in this tavern, today the site of a Burger King. The family would, over time, buy the majority of the land in what is now the hamlet named for them. They would donate land for the construction of the Great Western Turnpike built in 1799 (today Western Avenue), land for a local church (McKownville Methodist Church), and the original one room school house. The McKownville School District No. 11 was built around 1877, with a second one-room house (McKownville Annex School No. 11-A) built in 1887. Both were closed in 1953 and replaced by the Westmere Elementary School when the district was consolidated into the Guilderland Central School District.

In 1896, the Albany Country Club and Golf Course was built, straddling the Albany-Guilderland border which demolished remnants of the old King's Highway. The country club would be replaced by the University at Albany, SUNY (SUNYA) Uptown Campus in the 1960s. Though the university is a part of the identity of McKownsville, the relationship has at times been strained regarding the growth of the campus and its impacts on adjacent residential areas.

Being along Albany's city line, McKownville has long been a center of suburban development including residential, commercial/office, retail, and educational. Strip malls, fast food, hotels, and other retail line Western Avenue, including Stuyvesant Plaza which was the first suburban shopping plaza built outside the city border. In 1924, residents formed the McKownville Improvement Association to lobby the town to build sidewalks and a create a water district for the neighborhood. It continued to fight for smart-growth and opposed the building of Crossgates Mall and its subsequent additions. In 2004, the association's push for sidewalks finally came to fruition. One of the additions to Crossgates that the association was worried about was a 1998 proposal by owner Pyramid Companies that would have included a 12 story tall hotel, ice skating rink, miniature golf course, and an additional 2,000,000 square feet (190,000 m^{2}) of retail space to its already 1 million square feet. The expansion was dealt a serious blow when the McKownville United Methodist Church, which was an important piece of real estate for the expansion, refused to sell. The expansion would have made Crossgates the largest mall in the nation, but due to opposition from Guilderland the plan was dropped and later retooled for Syracuse's Destiny USA.

In 2002, it was found that in the 2000 Census 1,357 students at the Indian Quad dorms of SUNYA counted as part of Albany were actually in the town of Guilderland. Albany Mayor Jerry Jennings then refused to allow EMS and fire response from the city to cover Indian Quad and the Recreation and Convocation Center (today the SEFCU Arena), both in Guilderland. This caused a dispute between Mayor Jennings, who demanded payment from the town for $37,600 in past calls that the city responded to since 1999, and Ken Runion (Guilderland town supervisor) who claimed that Albany owed $363,000 that the city received from county sales taxes in 2001 that are based on population and included the Indian Quad.

== Geography ==
As a hamlet, the boundaries of McKownville are ill-defined, though generally considered to be the Governor Thomas E. Dewey Thruway (Interstate 87) and Fuller Road Alternate (unsigned NY Route 910F) to the west, the town of Bethlehem to the south, and the city of Albany to the east and north. Once a part of the Albany Pine Bush, it is mostly flat or very gently rolling hills. The Krum Kill marks the eastern border with Albany.

== Demographics ==
As a hamlet McKownville has no definitive boundaries and therefore it is difficult to have statistics on the population. It was estimated by the Albany Times Union in 1993 that there are approximately 2,756 persons with 1,137 housing units in the hamlet.

== Education ==
McKownville is a part of the Guilderland Central School District (GCSD) and the children attend Westmere Elementary School for kindergarten through 5th grade; and Farnsworth Middle School for 6th through 8th grade; and Guilderland High School for 9th through 12th.

== McKownville Fire Department ==
McKownville has its own fire department which was formed in 1918. The McKownville Fire Department is 100% volunteer and responds to approximately 250-300 calls for service a year. The department currently operates with two pumpers, one rescue truck, two command vehicles and a utility vehicle.
