= Dunsbach Ferry, New York =

Dunsbach Ferry
- Hamlet
- Location within New York Location within the United States
- Coordinates: 42°47′31″N 73°45′22″W
- Country: United States
- State: New York
- Region: Capital District
- County: Albany
- Town: Colonie
- Elevation: 187 ft (57 m)
- Time zone: UTC-5 (EST)
  - Summer (DST): UTC-4 (EDT)
- ZIP Code: 12047 (Cohoes)
- Area code: 518

Dunsbach Ferry is a hamlet of the town of Colonie, in Albany County, New York, United States. The hamlet sits to the east of, and below, the Thaddeus Kosciusko Bridge (also known as "The Twin Bridges"), where Interstate 87 (I-87) crosses the Mohawk River. There are numerous private and public docks and landings between the Twin Bridges and the Colonie Town Park. Dunsbach Ferry was once an important river crossing and a stop on the Schenectady and Troy Railroad (T&S), later a branch of the New York Central Railroad. The ZIP code is 12047 (Cohoes).

== History ==
In 1718, an early settler and ferry owner, Cornelius Claes Vandenburgh, built a landmark stone house on the Mohawk west of Crescent. Cornelius Claes Ferry was later called Dunsbach Ferry. Dunsbach Ferry originated, as the name suggests, as a ferry crossing over the Mohawk River. The ferry was replaced for a short time by the Dunsbach Ferry Bridge, a bridge that had an unusual pier construction method involving cylinders with piles driven inside with heavy crib work outside. This bridge was constructed by the Dunsbach Ferry Bridge Company in 1898 in three spans; two were carried away by ice in 1903, and the third in 1905. When the creation of the New York State Barge Canal moved the Erie Canal to the Mohawk River in 1910, the hamlet became home to many barge captains and as a stop for provisioning the barges. A gauging station was established at Dunsbach Ferry in 1898 by D.J. Howell for measuring the discharge flow of the river and the record continued on at the West Troy Water Company dam and pumping station at the hamlet, it was located roughly 200 feet south (upstream) of the bridge. The dam was built in order to supply West Troy (later Watervliet) with water, and was partially removed in 1912.

The bucolic nature of the surroundings made it a natural summer resort village. As year-round residents have become more common summer homes have become remodeled and winterized with additions built on, though some summer cottages remain and farms and undeveloped woodlands still shelter the inland side of the hamlet from the developments in Latham along U.S. Route 9 (US 9).

== Geography ==
While Colonie's hamlets do not have specifically demarcated borders, Dunsbach Ferry is generally considered to include the areas along the Mohawk River from I-87 to the Colonie Town Park. It is accessible by road from the Colonie hamlets of Boght Corners, Crescent Station, and Latham.

== Architecture ==
Dunsbach Ferry has architectural styles ranging from colonial, ranch, and cape, with sidings finished in a range of different materials including aluminum, clapboard, and shingles. Many of the homes along the river began as summer cottages and have been winterized and enlarged while some still remain in strictly summer-camp style.

== Education ==
Dunsbach Ferry is a part of the North Colonie Central School District (NCCS) and the children attend Boght Hills Elementary School for kindergarten through sixth grade; and Shaker High School for seventh through twelfth.
