= Delphus Kill =

- Location of the mouth within New York Delphus Kill (the United States)

Location
- Country: United States
- State: New York

Physical characteristics
- Mouth: Mohawk River
  - location: Dunsbach Ferry, New York
  - coordinates: 42°47′00″N 73°46′04″W
  - elevation: 187 ft (57 m)
- Basin size: 2.5 sq mi (6.5 km^{2})

Delphus Kill is a river that flows into the Mohawk River in Dunsbach Ferry, New York.
