= Fort Hunter, Albany County, New York =

Fort Hunter, New York
- Hamlet
- Location within New York Location within the United States
- Coordinates: 42°44′42″N 73°56′35″W
- Country: United States
- State: New York
- Region: Capital District
- County: Albany
- Town: Guilderland
- Settled: Early 1800s
- Time zone: UTC-5 (EST)
  - Summer (DST): UTC-4 (EDT)
- ZIP Code: 12303 (Schenectady)
- Area code: 518

Fort Hunter is a hamlet in the town of Guilderland, Albany County, New York, United States. Fort Hunter lies along New York Route 146 near the Albany-Schenectady county line. Exit 25 of the Governor Thomas E. Dewey Thruway and exit 9B of Interstate 890 is at the northern limits of the hamlet.

== History ==
The area of Fort Hunter was a part of the Pine Bush pine barrens, which once stretched west across Albany County from Albany to Schenectady. The hamlet was first settled as an outpost in the early 19th century, the oldest sections being in the northern reaches near the Albany-Schenectady county line. Newer growth has developed to the south, along New York Route 146 toward McCormacks Corners on U.S. Route 20 (Western Turnpike).

== Geography ==
As a hamlet, the borders of Fort Hunter are indeterminate. Generally, Fort Hunter is the area from Schenectady County south to US Route 20, and east to the Thruway (Interstate 90). The area is flat and sandy. Undeveloped areas are still pine-studded, reflecting the area's past as part of the pristine Pine Bush pine barrens.
