= Albany Health and Human Services Corporation =

The Albany Health and Human Services Corporation (AHHSC) is a proposed public benefit corporation (PBC) of Albany County, New York, and New York State. On May 11, 2009, Albany County Comptroller Michael Conners in his "2009 State of Fisc" proposed a PBC for health in Albany County. On June 9, 2009, the Albany County, Legislature adopted Resolution 205, which directs the County Executive to develop a plan for the long-term care of the elderly in Albany County.

== Reorganization of existing Albany County agencies ==
The Albany Health and Human Services Corporation (AHHSC) will merge the following county agencies:

1. Albany County Nursing Home
2. Department of Social Services (DSS)
3. Albany County Medicaid Program
4. Veterans Service Bureau
5. Department of Aging
6. Department for Children
7. Department Youth and Families
8. Albany County Housing Trust Fund

== Components ==
AHHSC will contain the following county subagencies

1. AHHSC Regulatory Board
2. AC Department of Social Services (DSS)
3. AC Health Stability Services (HSS)
4. AC Mortgage Stability Program (MSP)

== Regulatory Board ==
1. Chairperson - Albany County Commissioner of Health
2. Vice Chairperson - Albany County Commissioner of DSS
3. Director of the AC Health Stability Services (HSS)
4. Board Member - AC Legislature appointment
5. Board Member - AC Legislature appointment
6. Board Member - AC Legislature appointment
7. Board Member - AC Legislature appointment

== Facilities ==
A new county facility will be built which will have a long-term care facility, day bed facility and cooperative housing units for seniors. A county-operated day bed facility currently exists in Rockland County, New York. According to the Rockland County website, the Rockland County Department of Social Services administers the Rockland County Adult Home as a nonprofit institution.

Facility number two will be the existing Ann Lee Home (ALH). The ALH will be converted into an Osteopathic Medical School and county dialysis center. The Osteopathic Medical School will increase the number of physicians in Upstate New York and help in reducing the overall cost of health care. The State University of New York (SUNY) has no osteopathic medical school programs and New York has two of the US osteopathic medical schools. A ten-year study conducted by the US Centers for Disease Control (CDC) concluded that in 2008 only 3% of US health-care cost were actually emergency care. This report reinforces the need for additional medical schools and primary care physicians.

== History ==
Article 10C of the New York State Public Authorities laws gives the New York State (NYS) County Legislatures the authority to establish public benefit corporations (PBCs) for health in NYS. In 1969, the New York State (NYS) Legislature created the first PBC for health to better manage the public hospitals in New York City. The name of this PBC for health is the New York City Health and Hospitals Corporation (HHC). Since the creation of HHC additional PBCs for health have been created in Westchester, Nassau, and Erie Counties. In 2002, the Albany County comptroller's office submitted the county's Medicaid reform proposal. The county's Medicaid waiver is one of the earliest references to a county long-term care system.

In this Medicaid waiver proposal, the comptroller's office outlined a new system to manage the county's Medicaid program. The county comptroller's plan would essentially merge the county medicaid program with the county nursing home program. In the proposal Conners referred to Herman Giest's opposition to Medicaid in the 1960s. According to Conners: Giest recommended to then Governor Nelson Rockefeller that the poor should be covered by the state or counties health plans. If Giest's recommendations were followed New York State would have only participated in the Medicare portion of the Social Security Act of 1965. Options for accomplishing Giest's recommendations could have been to use the New York State Health Insurance Program (NYSHIP) since 1959. The New York State Legislature took Giest's warnings serious and that is why HHC was created in 1969. HHC also has the Metro Plus Plan, which is a health insurance plan for HHC beneficiaries.

Giest was not the only opposing voice to the Social Security Act of 1965; Edward R. Annis of the AMA also predicted that Medicare and Medicaid would have future problems. Annis predicted that Medicare and Medicaid would interfere with the patient and physician relationship. With the expansion of convenient care clinics across America the patient-physician relationship is becoming obsolete. The Congressional Budget Office (CBO) predicts that the federal government will need $32 trillion in United States public debt to fund the existing Medicare program. Given the current problems with Federal tax revenue by state The 2007-2010 economic crisis proves that the US Congress may have difficulty funding future federal health programs. The county comptroller's office warned again in 2005 by presenting a report advocating for reforms at the ACNH. The 2005 report explained the findings of a recent New York State Health Department inspection. In the 2005 report the comptroller's office again warned that a new facility (Olmstead Law Compliant), would be needed to replace the existing ACNH.

The federal and state governments in the United States have experimented with government-run health systems for several years. In order for the AHHSC to be a successful government-run health system, a review of existing government run health systems is needed. Government-run health systems were pioneered in the United Kingdom (UK) with the creation of National Health Services (NHS) in the 1940s. The federal government provides limited regulations in regards to certain aspects of the health industry; one of these regulatory agencies is the Food and Drug Administration. The federal government also administers the Federal Employees Health Benefits Program (FEHBP), Military Health System (MHS), Veterans Health Administration, Indian Health Service, State Children's Health Insurance Program, and the Department of Health and Human Services.

== Financing ==
The Albany Health and Human Services Corporation (AHHSC) will be financed through the sale of outstanding Albany County Department of Social Services (DSS) debt. Albany County, New York and the State of New York will hold no liability or responsibility for principal or interest payments on bonds or debt issued by the AHHSC. The AHHSC Chairman of the Board Directors will hire a private financial institution to handle all finances and borrowing for the AHHSC. The Albany County legislature will be responsible for setting borrowing limits for the AHHSC. The county legislature will also be responsible for establishing an ethics oversight board which will monitor the activities of the AHHSC and all other public authorities within Albany County, New York.

== Opposing views ==
On September 9, 2009, Albany County Executive Michael Breslin released “CHOICES: THE FUTURE OF LONG-TERM CARE IN ALBANY”. In Breslin's plan he supports the Program of All-Inclusive Care for the Elderly (PACE) and the Expanded In-Home Services for the Elderly Program (EISEP). Breslin's plan is consistent with the long-term care plan authored by County Legislator Patrick Timmins. The Timmins plan also supports ideas from County Comptroller Conners's original 2002 “Medicaid Waiver”. The Breslin Health Plan does not argue against the creation of a public benefit corporation for health in Albany County. The Breslin Health Plan argues against building a county long-term care facility in Albany County, New York.
