= Wemple, New York =

- Hamlet
- Location within New York Location within the United States
- Coordinates: 42°34′27″N 73°46′32″W
- Country: United States
- State: New York
- County: Albany
- Town: Bethlehem
- Elevation: 92 ft (28 m)
- Time zone: UTC-5 (Eastern (EST))
  - Summer (DST): UTC-4 (EDT)
- ZIP Code: 12077 (Glenmont)
- Area codes: 518 & 838
- GNIS feature ID: 973217

Wemple is a hamlet in Albany County, New York, United States.
