= Parker F. Dunn =

United States World War I Army Medal of Honor recipient

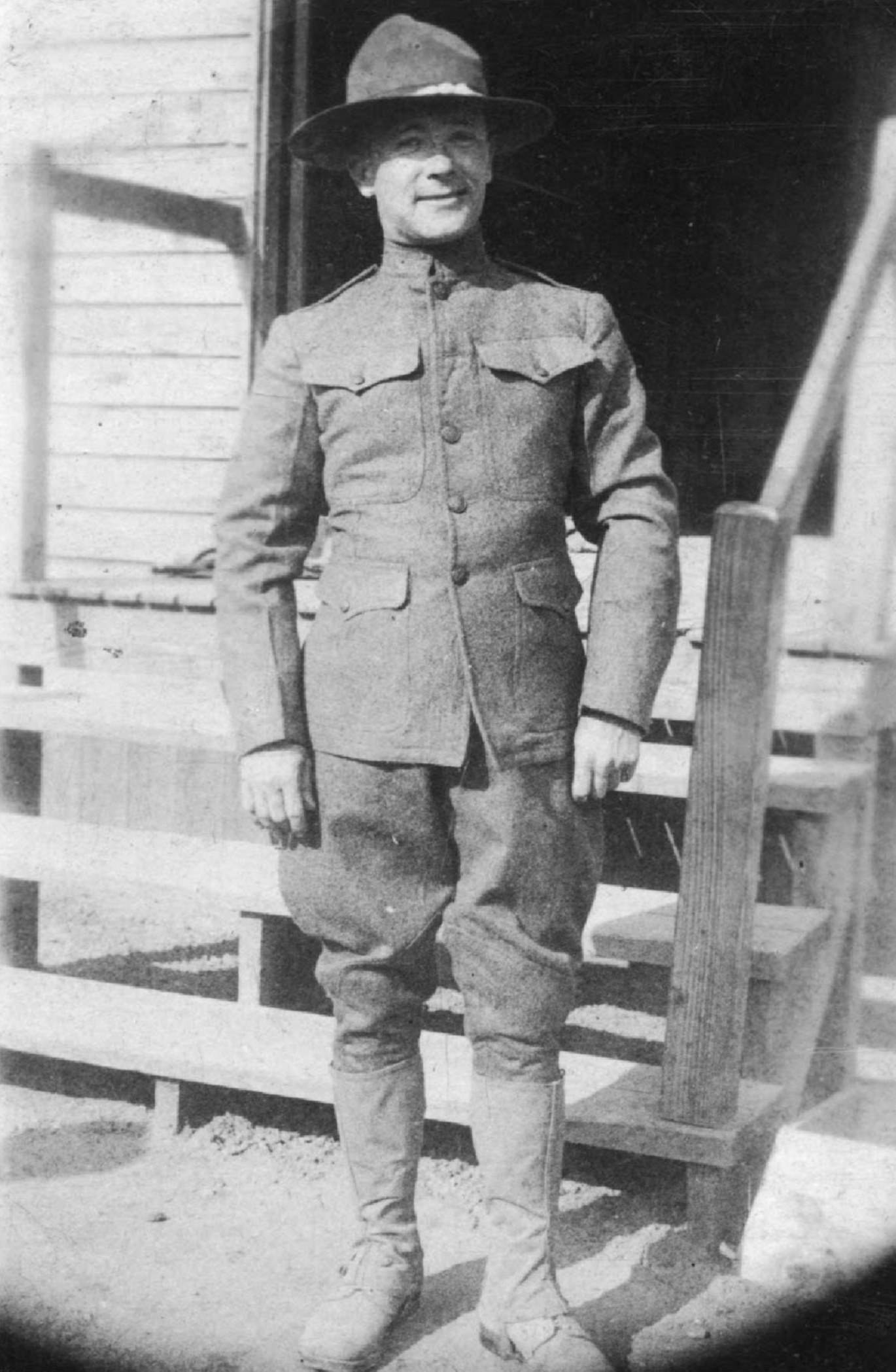
- Parker F. Dunn
- Born: August 8, 1890; Albany, New York, United States
- Died: October 23, 1918 (aged 28); Near Grandpré, Ardennes, France
- Military career
- Allegiance: United States
- Branch: United States Army
- Rank: Private First Class
- Service number: 2941321
- Units: Company A, 312th Infantry, 78th Division
- Conflicts: World War I
- Awards: Medal of Honor

Parker F. Dunn (August 8, 1890 – October 23, 1918) was an American soldier serving in the United States Army during World War I who received the Medal of Honor for bravery.

== Biography ==
Dunn was born in Albany, New York and after enlisting in the United States Army was sent to France to fight in World War I.

He died on October 23, 1918.

The Dunn Memorial Bridge, current bridge of that name built in 1969, is named in his honor.

== Medal of Honor Citation ==
Rank and organization: Private First Class, U.S. Army, Company A, 312th Infantry, 78th Division. Place and date: Near Grand-Pre, France, 23 October 1918. Entered service at: Albany, N.Y. Birth: Albany, N.Y. General Orders: War Department, General Orders No. 49, November 25, 1922.

Citation:

When his battalion commander found it necessary to send a message to a company in the attacking line and hesitated to order a runner to make the trip because of the extreme danger involved, Pfc. Dunn, a member of the intelligence section, volunteered for the mission. After advancing but a short distance across a field swept by artillery and machinegun fire, he was wounded, but continued on and fell wounded a second time. Still undaunted, he persistently attempted to carry out his mission until he was killed by a machinegun bullet before reaching the advance line.

== Military Awards ==
Dunn's military decorations and awards include:

1st row	Medal of Honor	World War I Victory Medal w/three bronze service stars to denote credit for the St. Mihiel, Meuse-Argonne and Defensive Sector battle clasps.

== See also ==
- List of Medal of Honor recipients for World War I
