= Crescent Station, New York =

Crescent Station
- Hamlet
- Etymology: Railroad station named for nearest hamlet- Crescent in Saratoga County
- Location within New York Location within the United States
- Coordinates: 42°47′54″N 73°44′1″W
- Country: United States
- State: New York
- Region: Capital District
- County: Albany
- Town: Colonie
- Time zone: UTC-5 (EST)
  - Summer (DST): UTC-4 (EDT)
- ZIP Code: 12047 (Cohoes)
- Area code: 518

Crescent Station is a hamlet of the town of Colonie in Albany County, New York, United States that straddles US Route 9.

== History ==
Crescent Station takes its name from a stop on the Schenectady and Troy Railroad (T&S), later a branch of the New York Central Railroad. The T&S Line was completed in 1842, and owned by the nearby city of Troy. Passenger service ended in 1942, though a Ford tractor branch in Crescent continued to receive service. In 1965, service between Crescent Station and Niskayuna was cut, and then when the Green Island Bridge was converted from rail to automobile use service was cut to Troy in 1958. Service between Crescent Station and Green Island was abandoned in 1976. It is now part of the Mohawk Hudson Hike/Bike Trail.

== Geography ==
Colonie's town landfill is located at the north end of the hamlet, near the border with Cohoes and the Mohawk River. The Colonie Town Park is to the west, between Crescent Station and the Colonie hamlet of Dunsbach Ferry.
