= Guilderland High School =

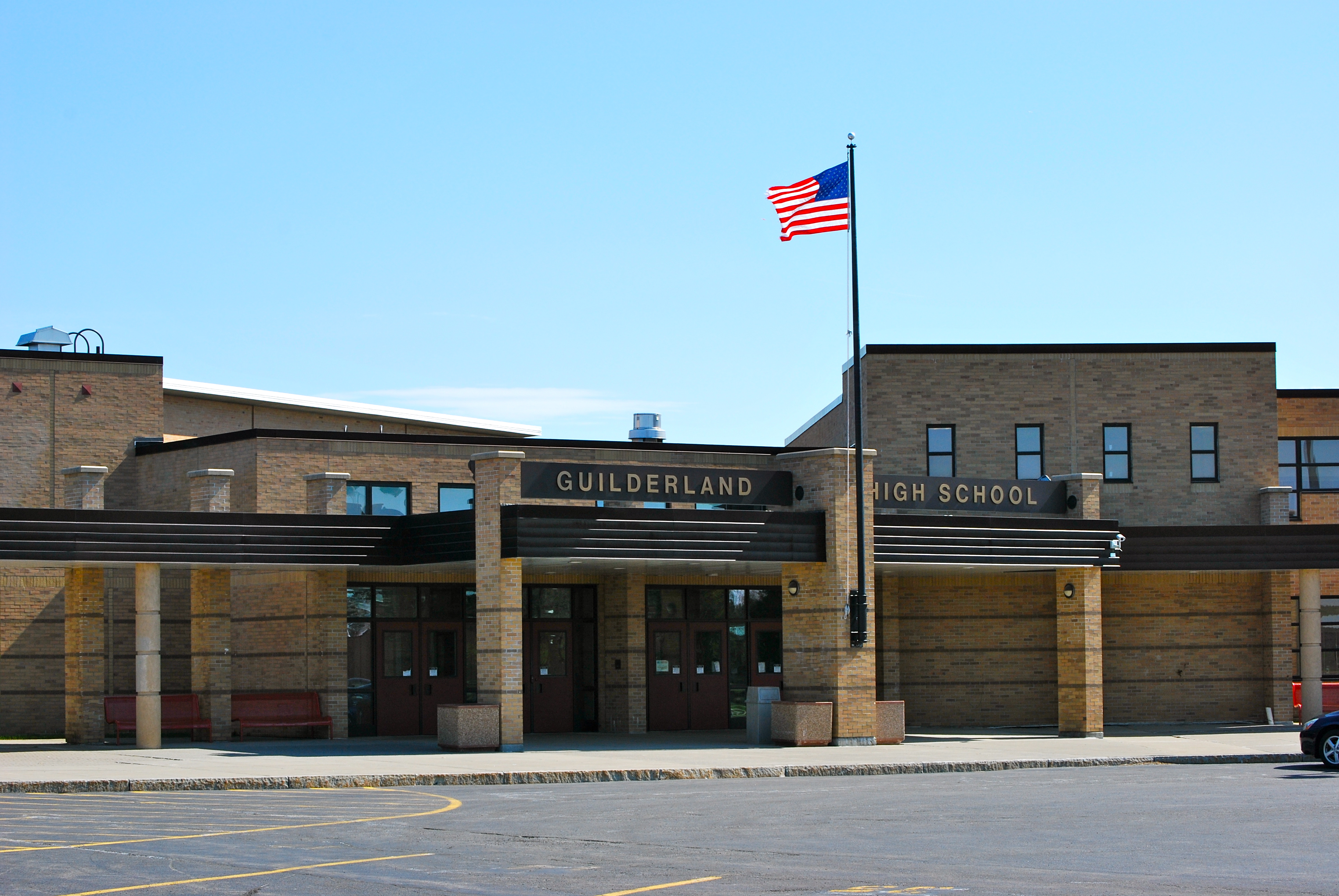

Location
- Guilderland Center, New York; United States; 42.697458°N 73.966035°W

Information
- Type: Public
- Founded: 1953
- School district: Guilderland Central School District
- Principal: Michael Piscitelli
- Faculty: 130.08 (on an FTE basis)
- Grades: 9–12
- Enrollment: 1,484 (2023-2024)
- Student to teacher ratio: 11.41
- Colors: Red and White
- Mascot: Flying Dutchmen
- Nickname: Flying Dutchmen
- Newspaper: The Journal
- Website: www.guilderlandschools.org/guilderland-high-school/

Guilderland High School is a public senior high school, located in Guilderland Center, New York. It is part of the Guilderland Central School District. Constructed in 1953, the high school has since undergone additions in 1955, 1960, 1997, 2010, and 2021. Originally, the building functioned as a Junior-Senior High School, but after the construction of Farnsworth Middle School in 1970, the district divided the schools into two. As a school, Guilderland High School's enrollment jurisdiction also includes the village of Altamont, NY and the North Bethlehem neighborhood of Bethlehem, NY.

Currently, the school runs on block scheduling.

== Course levels ==
Guilderland High School has a variety of different course levels and types to accommodate the different needs of students. Types include Advanced Placement, SUPA (Syracuse University Project Advance), Honors, Regents, Core, Focus, Vo-Tech, ESL, as well as various additional college programs. Project Lead the Way courses in various engineering subjects are offered with an opportunity to obtain credits from the Rochester Institute of Technology.

== The Guilderland Players ==
Guilderland High School has a theater program. The group, called the Guilderland Players, was organized in the 1968-69 school year.

== Music ==
Guilderland High School is home to a department. The department holds many concerts a year in addition to participating in other events or area concerts.

The school has a concert orchestra, a symphony orchestra and a chamber strings group, which is an extracurricular ensemble consisting of approximately 15 string players, with occasional guest winds.

The school has a concert choir and a extracurricular Chamber Choir. In December 2006, the Chamber Choir performed at the NYSSMA Convention in Rochester, NY. In March 2007, the ensemble won the New York State High School A Cappella Championship.

== Extracurricular activities ==
=== Student media ===
The school has a student newspaper named The Journal, which is published seven times in the school year. The school's Media Club produces a live televised news program The GHS Reporter that runs at the start of homeroom prior to the televised announcements, replays on Time Warner Cable Educational-access television cable TV Channel 16 in Guilderland.

=== Sports ===
Guilderland's athletes are known as the Flying Dutchmen. The district offers 19 sports at all levels. The boys' soccer team won the Class A State Championship in 1989, the 2006, 2007 and 2008 co-ed cheerleading national champions, the 2007 New York State Section II Class A Girls' lacrosse team and New York State's 2007 section 2 class AA champion baseball team.

=== Clubs and organizations ===
Guilderland High School sponsors dozens of student-organizations, each advised and supervised by a teacher who may participate in the club's activities. They include but are not limited to:

Alliance, Best Buddies, Chess Club, P.U.L.S.E (Christian Fellowship), the Guilderland Players, International Club/Cultural Fair, Journal Newspaper, Key Club International, Math League, Masterminds, Media Club, Medical Club (Club Med), Model United Nations, Music Council, National Honor Society, Students Against Destructive Decisions (SADD), Tri-M Music Honor Society, VEX Robotics, and Yearbook.

== GreatSchools.org rating ==
In 2009, GHS earned a 6 out of 10 rating according to metrics measured by the website GreatSchools.org. Though the school continues to achieve parity in state testing scores relative to other high schools across the state of NY, only 50% of the students passed the Mathematics A examination in 2009, which led to the school's diminished rating.

In 2018, GHS earned an 8 out of 10 rating according to metrics measured by the website GreatSchools.org. The school is above average in academics receiving a 10/10 in college readiness. Where the school loses points is its equity overview.

== Notable alumni ==
- Harold J. Greene, 1977 - Major General, US Army-General Officer killed in Combat August 5, 2014
- Clancy Newman, 1995 - cellist and composer
- Warren Redlich, 1984 - lawyer and Libertarian candidate for New York Governor
- Kristin Russo, 1998 - American speaker, personality, and LGBTQ activist
- Lidiya Yankovskaya, 2004 - Conductor - Orli and Bill Staley Music Director, Chicago Opera Theater
- Brian Tomasik, 2005 - researcher and ethicist
