= Middleburgh School District =

School district in New York, United States

Middleburgh Central School District
- Middleburgh High School during a visit by former NY Governor Pataki

Address
- 291 Main Street Middleburgh, New York, 12122; United States
- Coordinates: 42°35′48″N 74°20′01″W

District information
- Type: Public school district
- Grades: K to 12
- Superintendent: Mark Place
- School board: Middleburgh Central School Board of Education
- NCES District ID: 3619260

Students and staff
- Enrollment: 716 (2019-2020)
- Faculty: 70.30 (on FTE basis)
- Student–teacher ratio: 10.18

Other information
- Website: middleburghcsd.org

The Middleburgh School District is a public school district located in Middleburgh, New York, U.S. It is one of the largest school districts in New York by land area. The district educates about 1,000 students in two schools.

== Founding ==
Middleburgh's school district was serviced originally by a one-room school house. Where the current high school is situated was another school which existed until the current building was erected early in the twentieth century.

== Current ==
The superintendent is Brian Dunn. The elementary school principal is Amy Irwin. The chief counselor for the Home Run Program in the elementary school is Penny Avitabile. The high school principal is Matthew Sloane.

== School Board ==
The Middleburgh School Board meets in the school's library. In the 2008 school board election, challenger Araxi Dutton Palmer was defeated by Kim Smith by a 405–329 margin. Members of the current board include Frank Herodes. The last previous president of the board was Michael Richmond.
