= Dunn Memorial Bridge =

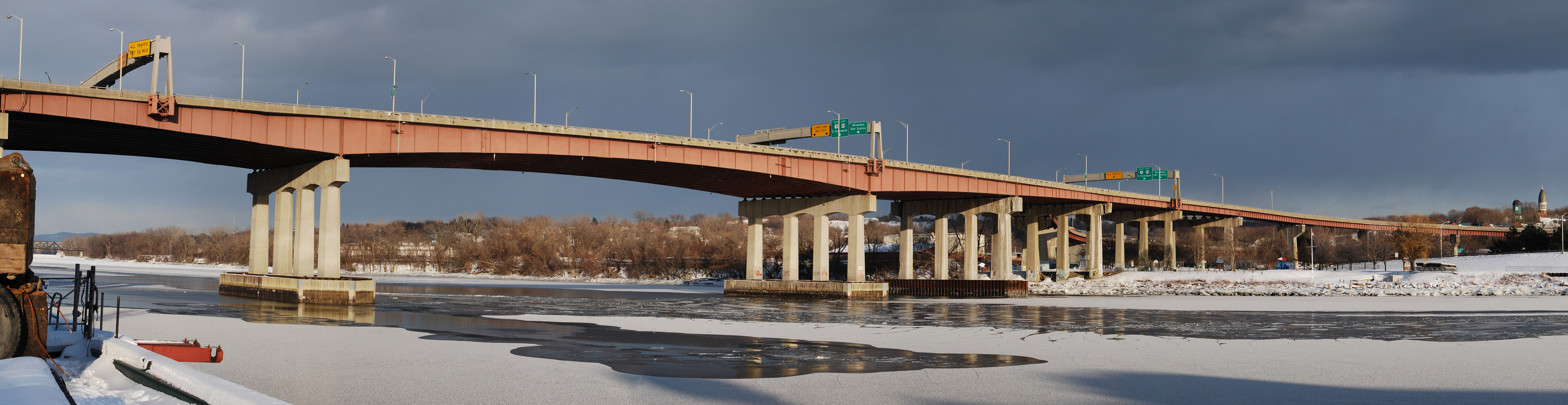
- The Dunn Bridge from Albany
- Coordinates: 42.643136°N 73.747551°W
- Carries: 8 lanes of US 9 / US 20 NY Bike Rte 5 NY Bike Rte 9
- Crosses: Hudson River
- Locale: Albany and Rensselaer, NY
- Official name: Private Parker F. Dunn Memorial Bridge
- Other name: Dunn Memorial Bridge
- Maintained by: New York State Department of Transportation
- ID number: 1093029

Characteristics
- Design: Steel girder bridge
- Clearance below: 60 ft

History
- Opened: 1969

Statistics
- Daily traffic: 36,000

Location
- Interactive map of Dunn Memorial Bridge

The Dunn Memorial Bridge, officially known and dedicated as the Private Parker F. Dunn Memorial Bridge, carries U.S. Route 9 (US 9), and U.S. Route 20 (US 20), across the upper Hudson River between Albany, New York and Rensselaer, New York.

== Description ==
It is the third highway/road bridge crossing the upper Hudson River at this site, with previous bridges at the location built in 1882 and 1933. The current span was constructed 1967–1969 and completed in 1969 to replace the earlier parallel smaller/narrower span with an extensive steel girder superstructure framework above the roadbed, built 1931–1933, with a center section which opened to allow passing barges and boats to pass through, which was dedicated bearing the same name, and memory of Private First Class Parker F. Dunn (1890–1918).

An earlier crossing of the Hudson at this same site was constructed in 1882, also of steel girders but with older technology of additional wrought iron superstructure trusses above the roadbed and the wood plank roadbed for horse-drawn carriages, wagons and single horse-back or pedestrian traffic stretching level straight across the tops and resting / bolted on several supporting stone piers. Known as the old Albany-Greenbush Bridge, it existed from about 1882 to 1933.

The current 1969 arching highway bridge has a steel girder design supporting underneath the roadbed deck, bolted onto the tops of reinforced steel bars framework embedded in poured concrete piers anchored in the riverbed bottom. The bridge superstructure road deck arches up high enough off the normal river water surface to allow passing river boat / barge traffic without a center-section opening span piece. It is the southernmost toll-free road crossing of the upper Hudson River

Both two of the most recent Hudson River spans of 1933 and 1969, were named and dedicated for Private first class Parker F. Dunn (August 1890 – October 1918), of the United States Army, an Albany native who was posthumously awarded the congressional Medal of Honor for his service in the First World War, after being killed approximately two weeks before the Armistice.

The old 1930s bridge which was the first of two to carry Private Dunn's name was kept up for a few years after its 1960s successor opened, but was eventually demolished (and many steel girders recycled) by 1971.

While traveling eastbound on the Dunn Memorial Bridge towards the City of Rensselaer, New York, there is a noticeable stub where the road ends and traffic is "forced off" the bridge onto off-ramps for U.S. Route 9 and U.S. Route 20. The road was originally supposed to continue on as part of the canceled South Mall Expressway to Interstate 90 at the present-day Exit 8.

Rensselaer's Riverfront Park is located under the eastern end of the Dunn Memorial Bridge. Peregrine falcons have been observed nesting under the roadway since about 1998, and the New York State Department of Environmental Conservation set up a webcam (video / television monitoring camera system) to broadcast its signal on the internet, to monitor and protect them.

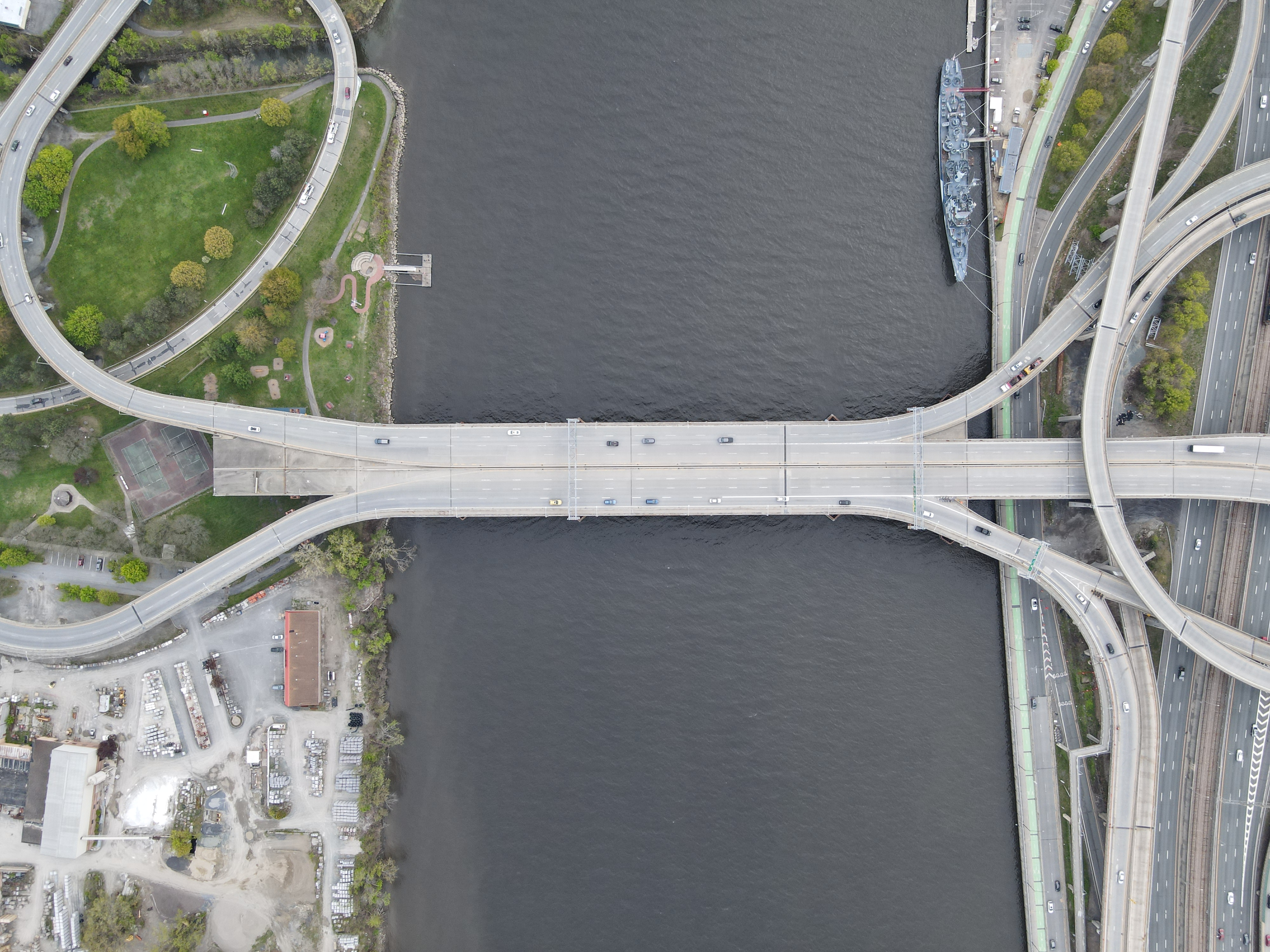
Dunn Memorial Bridge of 1969, crossing the upper Hudson River, aerial view from directly above

On July 27, 2005, the bridge was temporarily closed when a ramp leading to the Empire State Plaza split vertically, causing the roadbed to drop more than a foot. A section of the ramp, which at 89 feet (27 m) tall is the uppermost one connecting to the bridge, had slipped and come to rest on a concrete supporting pier. The Department of Transportation was alerted to the situation by a call from a commuter who had driven over the gap. Two steel towers were installed to support the ramp and it was later repaired.

On March 25, 2014, a man jumped off the bridge following a police chase in connection with a shooting the previous night. The man survived and was evacuated via ambulance.

== Bicycle and pedestrian access ==
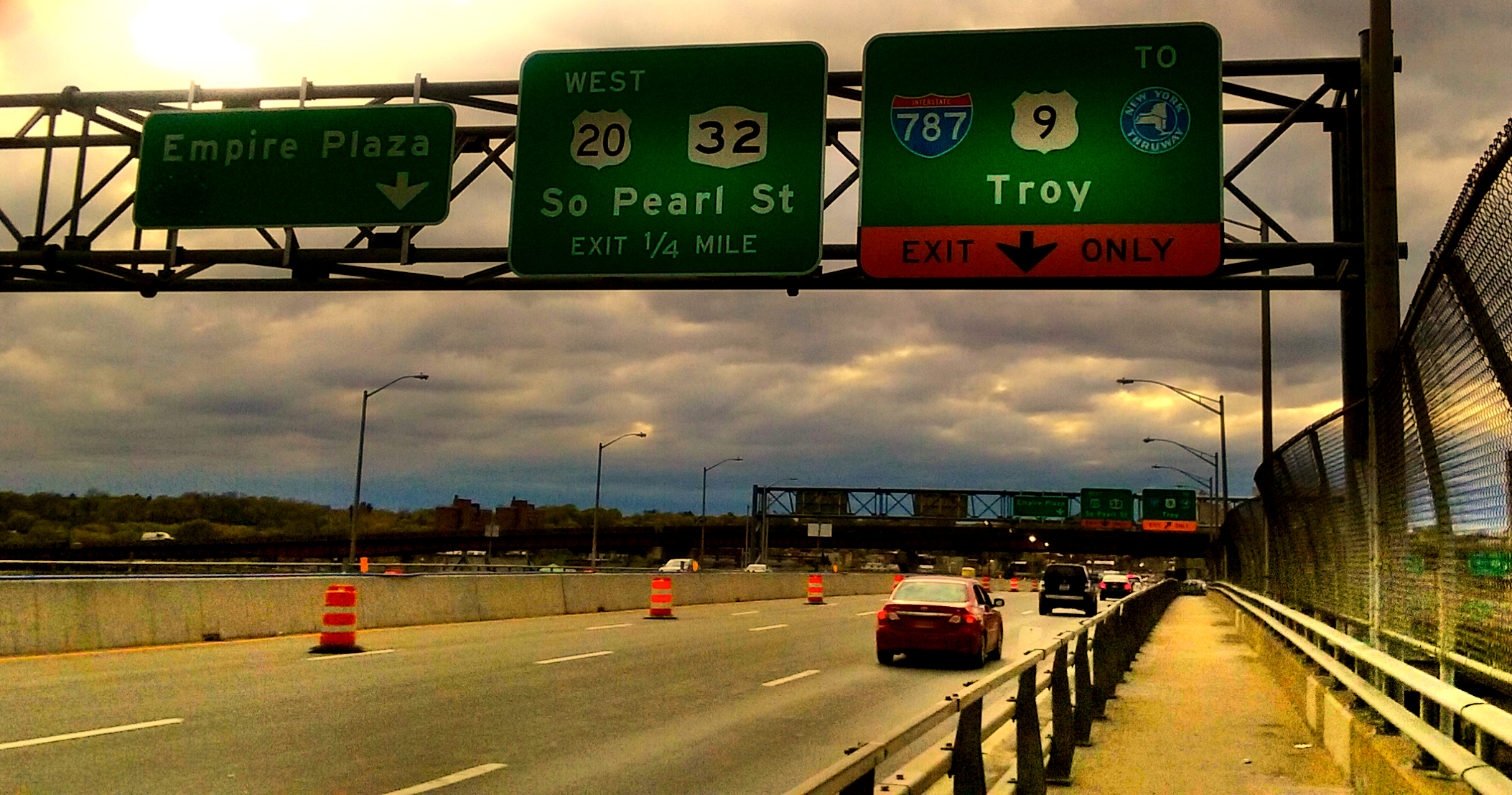
View from the top of the bridge facing toward Albany.

Bicyclists and pedestrians may use the sidewalk along the north side of the bridge.

== Gallery ==
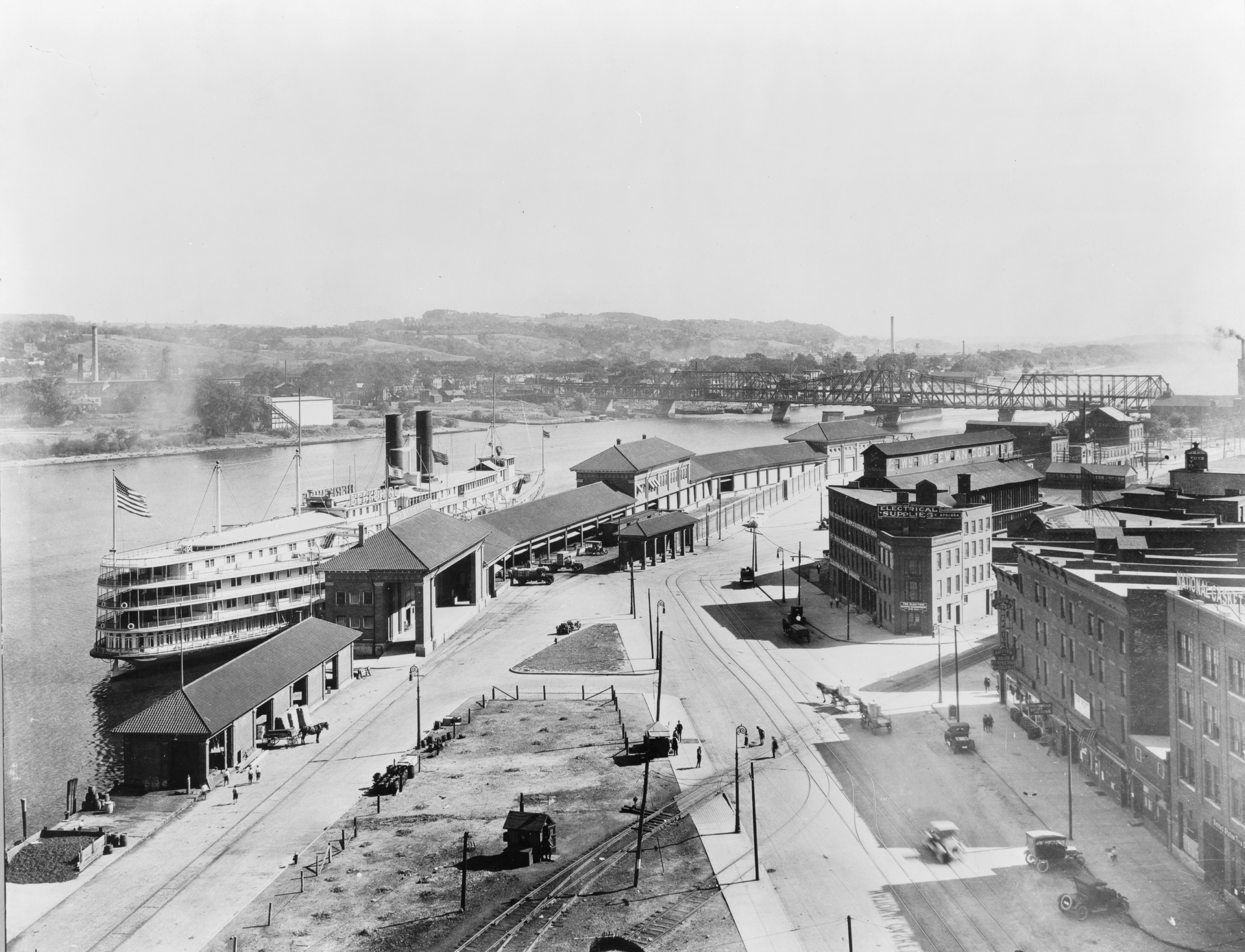
The Greenbush Bridge, seen in the background of this image, preceded the Dunn Memorial Bridge.

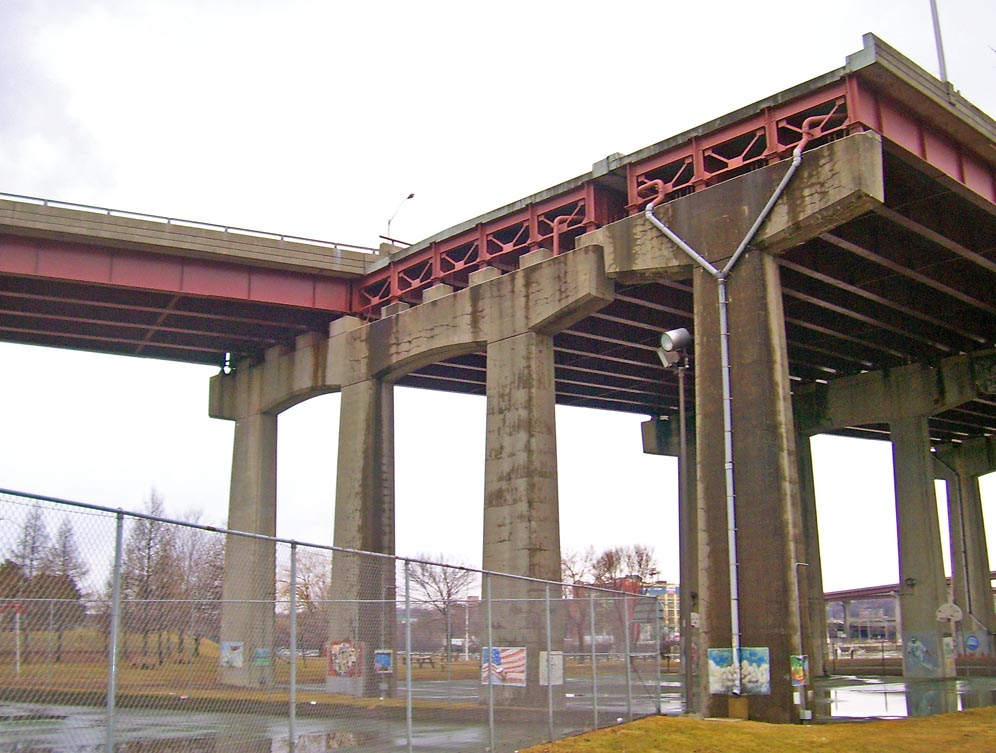
The stubs at the bridge's eastern end, built for the canceled South Mall Expressway.

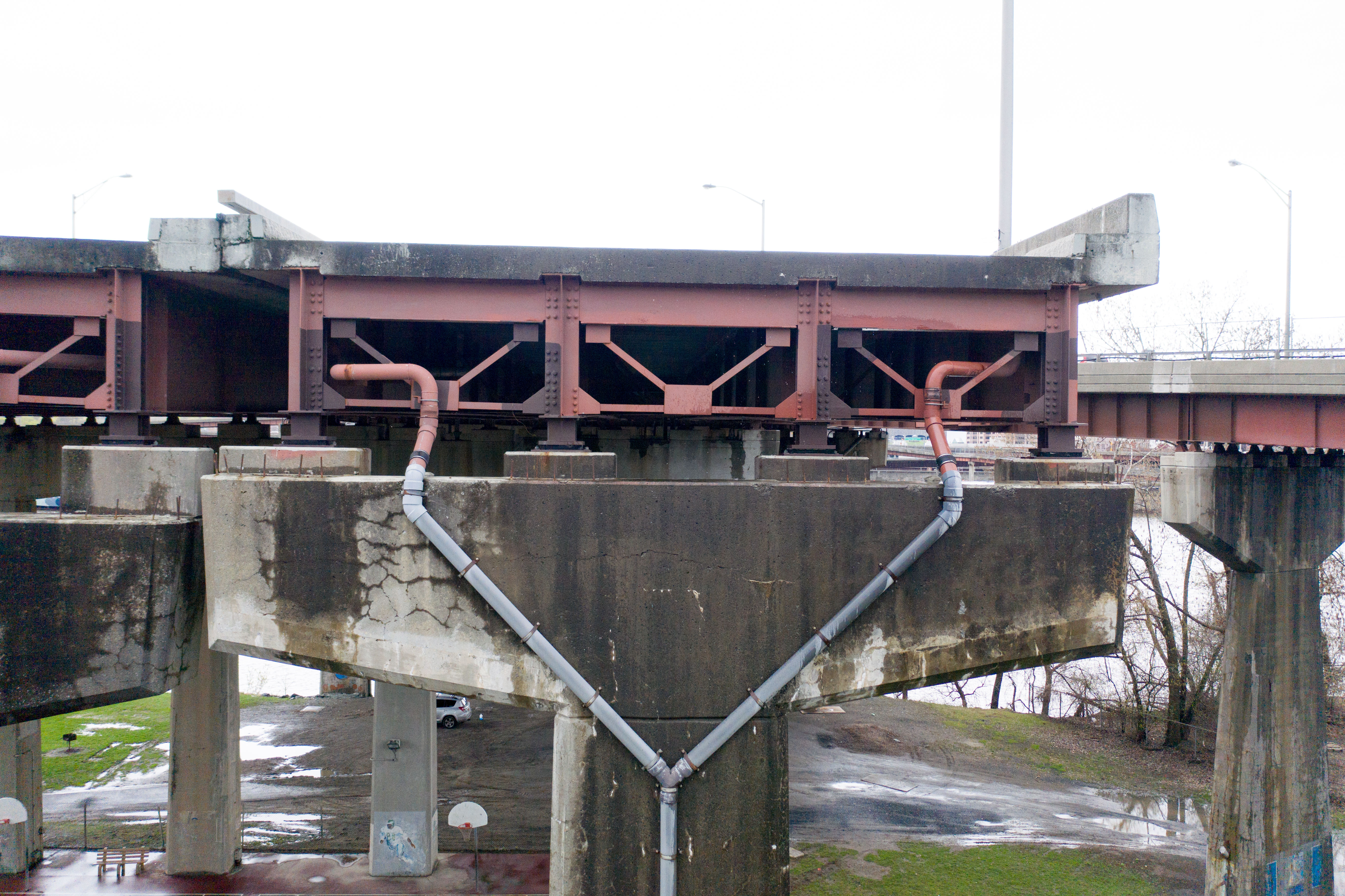
A cross section of the unfinished eastern portion of one of the sides of the Dunn Memorial Bridge.

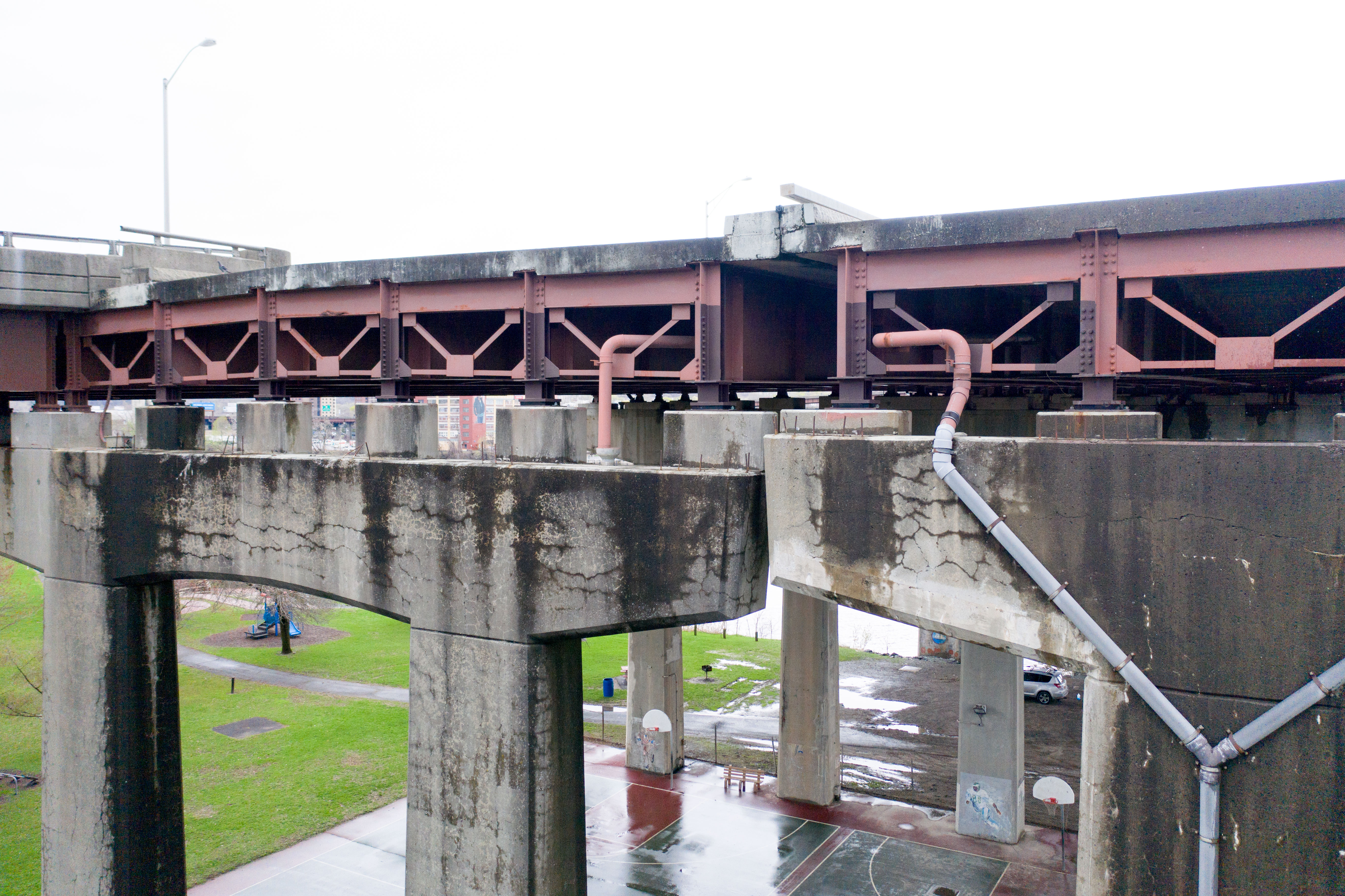
Supports for the unfinished end of the Dunn Memorial Bridge.

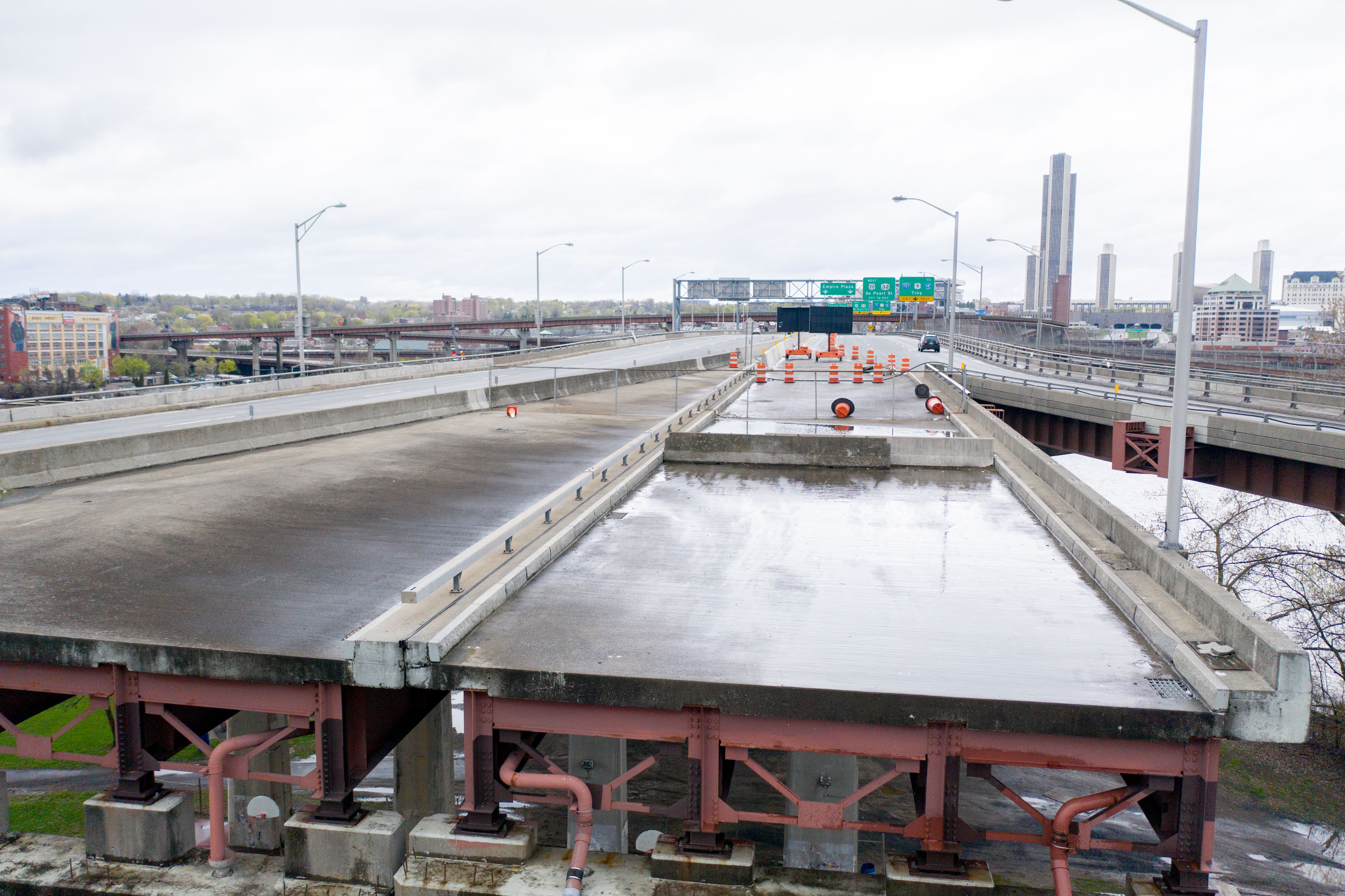
Surface and structure of the unfinished end of the Dunn Memorial Bridge.

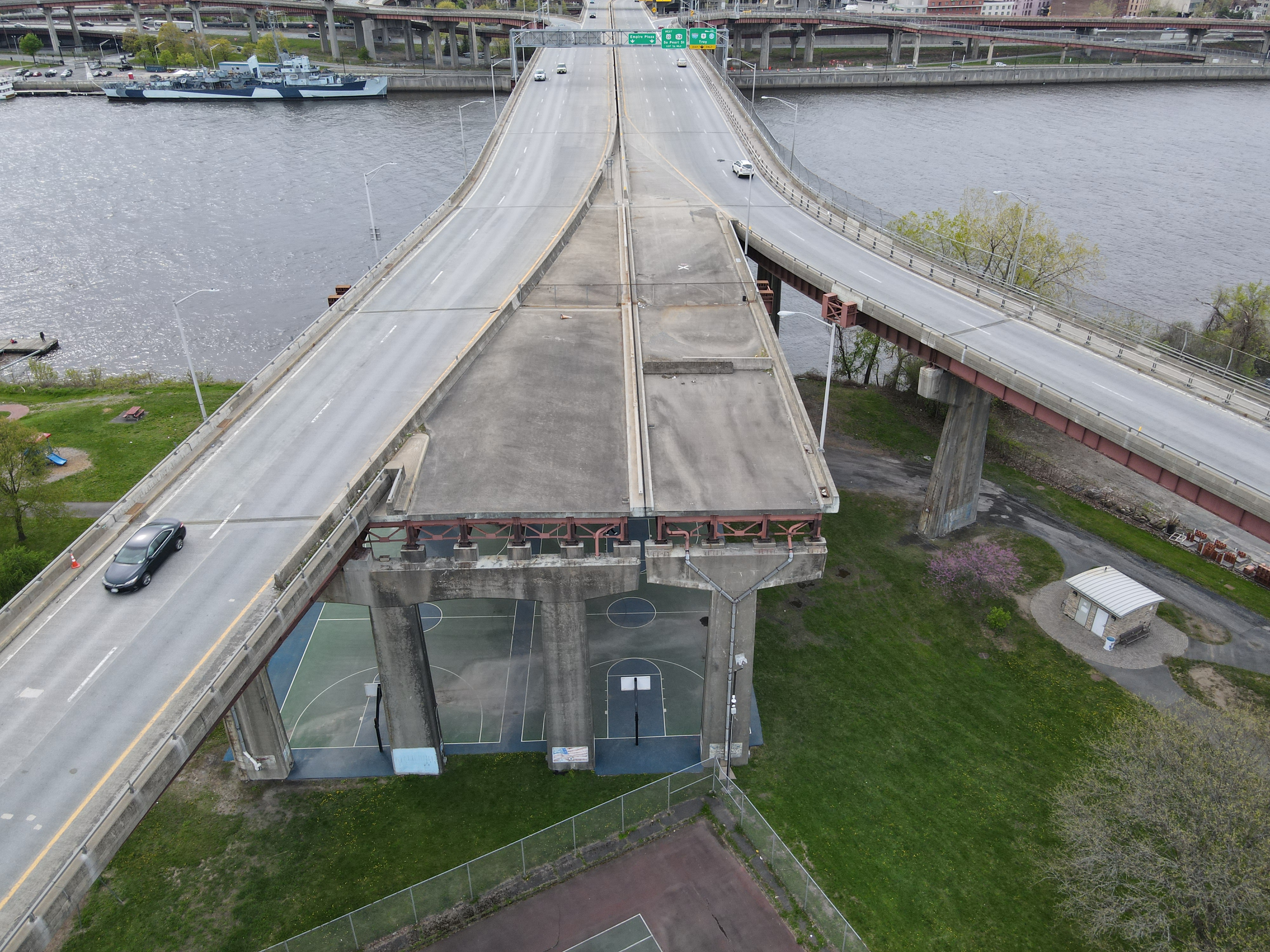
The Dunn Memorial Bridge from the unfinished Rensselaer, NY side heading to Albany, NY.

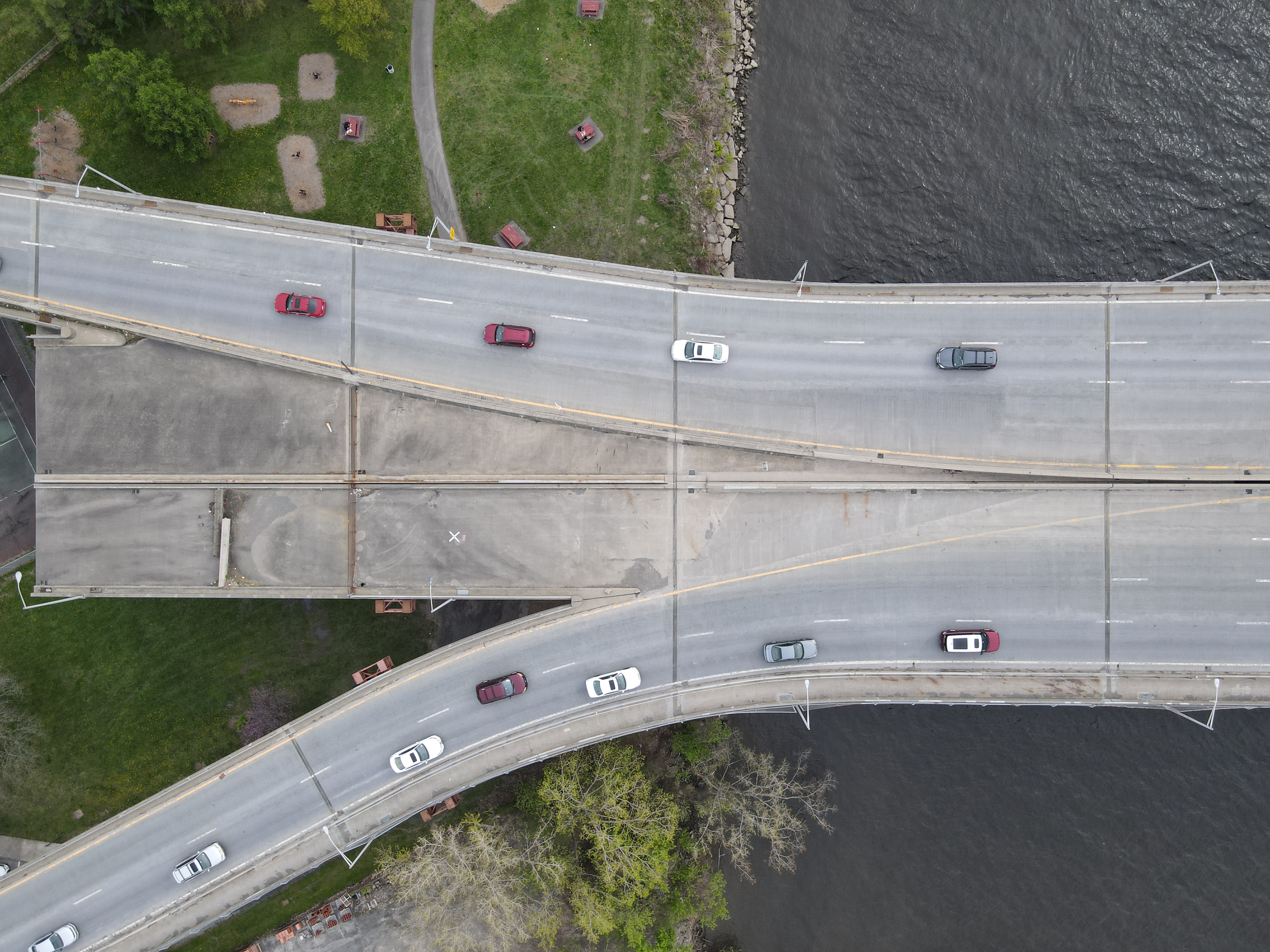

== See also ==
- List of fixed crossings of the Hudson River
