= Shaker High School =

Public high school in Lantham, New York

Location
- 445 Watervliet-Shaker Road; Latham, (Albany County), New York 12110; United States; 42°44′09″N 73°44′51″W

Information
- School type: Public school (government funded), high school
- Motto: Terras Irradiemus (Let us light the Earth)
- Founded: 1958
- School district: North Colonie Central Schools
- NCES District ID: 3621000
- Superintendent: Kathleen Skeals
- CEEB code: 333388
- NCES School ID: 362100002985
- Principal: Crystal Fox
- Teaching staff: 162.75 (FTE)
- Grades: 9–12
- Gender: Coeducational
- Enrollment: 2,018 (2022-23)
- Student to teacher ratio: 12.40
- Colors: Royal blue and white
- Mascot: Bison
- Team name: Blue Bison
- Website: www.northcolonie.org/shaker-high-school/

Shaker High School is a four-year public high school in Latham, New York, United States. It is the only high school operated by the North Colonie Central Schools School District in Albany County, New York.

== History ==
Shaker High School was established in 1958, with its first class graduating in 1960. The school is named after the Shakers, a religious group that once inhabited the area.

== Academics ==
The school offers Advanced Placement (AP) courses, honors courses, and career and technical education (CTE) programs. AP coursework offered covers subjects such as English, mathematics, science, social studies, and world languages, while CTE programs specialize in engineering, culinary arts, computer science, and business.

In 2021, the school was ranked #21 in New York State by U.S. News & World Report. The school has also received recognition from the College Board as an AP Honor Roll school for its high percentage of students who receive a passing score on AP exams.

The school provides academic counseling, peer tutoring, and study groups for students. The school also offers programs for students who need additional support, such as special education services, English as a second language (ESL) support, and academic intervention services.

== Athletics ==
There are 28 interscholastic sports at Shaker. Shaker's "Blue Bison" sports teams include soccer, basketball, track, cross country, golf, ice hockey, wrestling, field hockey, lacrosse, swimming, diving, gymnastics, tennis, cheerleading, softball, volleyball, bowling, football, and baseball. Shaker also has several club teams, including Shaker Crew, the rowing team.

The school is a member of the New York State Public High School Athletic Association (NYSPHSAA) and competes in Section 2 of the organization.

The school's athletic facilities include a gymnasium, a swimming pool, tennis courts, baseball and softball fields, and a track and field complex. The school also has an award-winning strength and conditioning program. In addition to competitive sports, the school offers physical education classes and intramural sports programs.

== Music ==
Shaker High School has curricular band, orchestra, chorus, and wind ensembles. Shaker has four extracurricular vocal performance groups, including Shaker Select and Resolving Suspenders. The school also has select instrumental ensembles, including Pep Band, Marching Band, Jazz Band, and Counterpoint Strings.

The school's music ensembles perform at various events throughout the year, including school concerts, community events, and regional competitions. The school has a strong tradition of excellence in music, with many of its ensembles winning awards and accolades at regional and state competitions.

== Clubs and organizations ==
In addition to athletics, Shaker High School has a range of clubs and organizations for students to participate in. These clubs cover a wide range of interests, including community service, student government, journalism, business, drama, and STEM. The school also has a thriving History Bowl and a robotics team that compete at the national and international level.

=== Robotics ===
Shaker High School's robotics team, known as "Shaker Robotics" or "2791," is one of the school's most successful extracurricular programs. The team competes in the FIRST Robotics Competition, a worldwide competition that challenges students to design, build, and program robots to compete in a series of challenges.

Shaker Robotics has a long history of success in the competition, with multiple regional championships and numerous appearances at the world championship. The team has won numerous awards for its robot designs, programming, and teamwork.

=== History Bowl ===
The school has multiple History Bowl teams, each consisting of 4-6 students. The teams have won multiple regional events and competed in the national championships in Washington, DC. One of the teams was the National Champion of the Spring 2022 National History Bowl Championship.

=== Science Bowl ===
The school's Science Bowl team finished first in their regional competition in 2020, earning trips to the national competition in Washington, DC.

=== Drama ===
The school puts on two annual theatrical shows, a fall play, and a spring musical. Both shows draw large crowds to the school auditorium and receive great remarks for students singing, dancing, and acting abilities.

== Notable alumni ==
- Mike Campese, guitarist and composer who was part of the Trans-Siberian Orchestra
- Leah Dickerman, Curator of Painting and Sculpture at the Museum of Modern Art (MoMA) in New York City
- Paul Elie, former Farrar, Straus & Giroux editor; and author.
- James H. Fallon, neuroscientist, Fulbright, NIH, and Sloan Scholar
- Joseph Finder, thriller author
- Jeff Hoffman, baseball pitcher for the Toronto Blue Jays
- Tommy Kahnle (born 1989), baseball pitcher for the Boston Red Sox
- Sam Perkins, former professional NBA basketball player, NCAA champion and Olympic gold medalist
- Becca Rausch (born 1979), lawyer and member of the Massachusetts State Senate, from the Norfolk, Middlesex, and Bristol districts.
- Marina Shafir (born 1988), Moldovan professional wrestler and mixed martial artist
- Igor Vamos, member of The Yes Men
- Deborah Van Valkenburgh, actress; co-star of the TV sitcom Too Close for Comfort and the film The Warriors, among others
- Madison VanDenburg, finalist in Season 17 of American Idol
- Ron Vawter, actor, Obie Award recipient, and founding member of The Wooster Group
- Kevin M. Warsh (born 1970), 17th Chair of the Federal Reserve, former member of the Federal Reserve Board of Governors, Washington, DC, attorney and financier, and brother of Alexandra Steele (née Kate Warsh)
- Jason West, mayor of New Paltz, New York
- Tony Wise, former NFL assistant coach
