= Guilderland Central School District =

School district in the U.S. state of New York

Location
- Guilderland, New York United States

District information
- Type: Public
- Grades: K-12
- Superintendent: Daniel Mayberry
- Schools: 7
- Budget: ▲$119,772,194

Students and staff
- Students: 4,828
- Teachers: 435

Other information
- Website: www.guilderlandschools.org

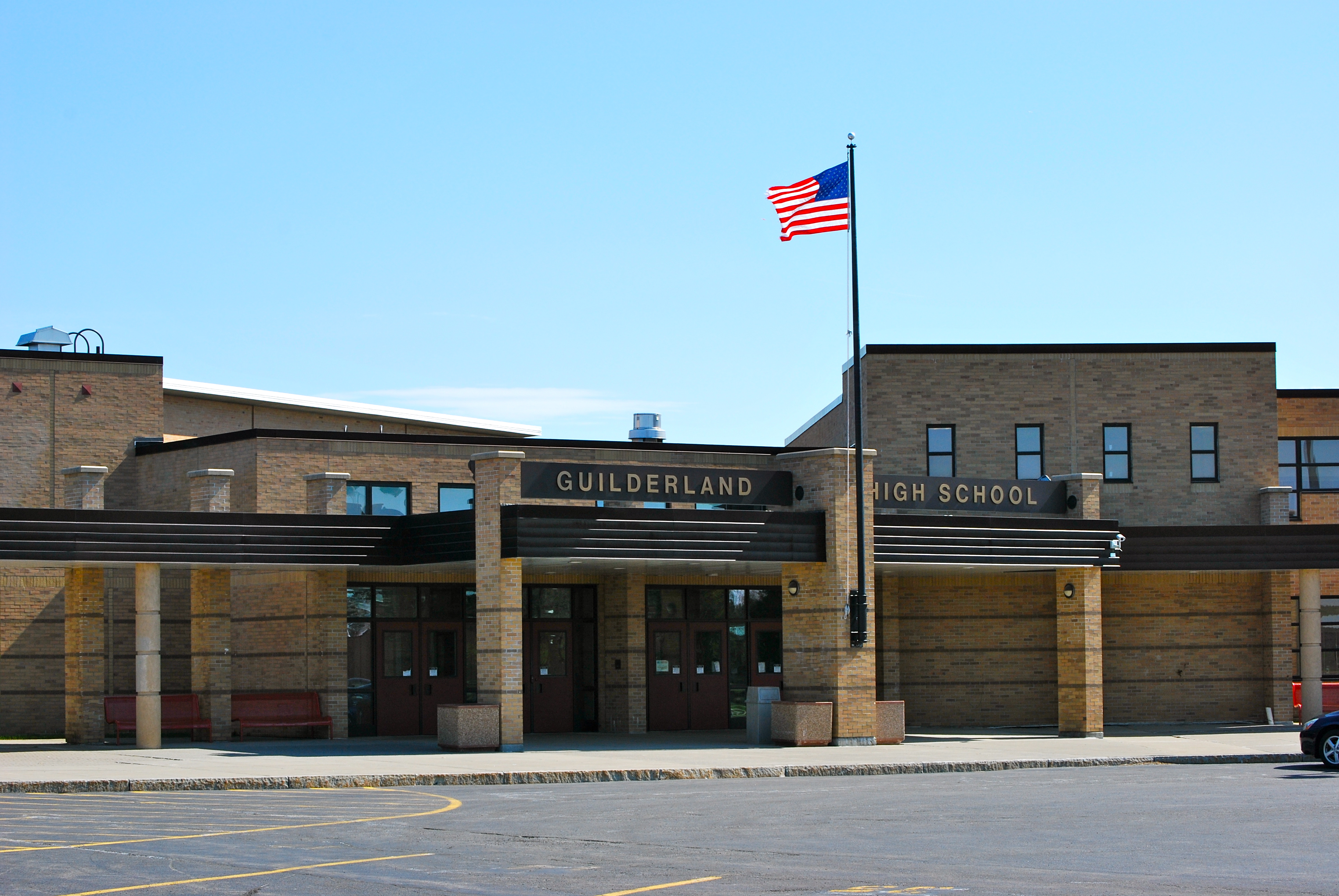
Entrance to Guilderland High School

Guilderland Central School District (GCSD) is a school district encompassing most of the Town of Guilderland and parts of Bethlehem, New Scotland, and Knox. The district serves approximately 4,828 K-12 students across seven school buildings.

== Schools ==
The district consists of five elementary schools, one middle school, and one high school.

- Altamont Elementary School (constructed 1953)
- Guilderland Elementary School (constructed 1955)
- Lynnwood Elementary School (constructed 1968)
- Pine Bush Elementary School (constructed 1994)
- Westmere Elementary School (constructed 1953)
- Farnsworth Middle School (constructed 1970)
- Guilderland High School (constructed 1953)

=== Construction and renovations ===
The Pine Bush Elementary School on Carman Road, Route 146, opened in September 1994. It was approved by the community due to the district's growing enrollment. In 1999, a major expansion and renovation project, supported by a $24 million bond issue, was completed at Guilderland High School. In October 2001, voters approved the expansion and renovation of Farnsworth Middle School—a $19.7 million project which was completed in September 2005. This project included a fourth gym and the entire Seneca House.
