= North Colonie Central Schools =

School district in the U.S. state of New York

Location
- Colonie, New York Albany County, New York, 12110; United States

District information
- Motto: "Terras Irradiemus"
- Grades: K-12
- Superintendent: Kathleen Skeals
- Asst. superintendent(s): Naté Turner-Hassell, Cybil Howard
- Schools: Blue Creek Elementary, Latham Ridge Elementary, Boght Hills Elementary, Loundonville Elementary, Forts Ferry Elementary, Southgate Elementary, Shaker Middle School, Shaker High School
- Budget: $92,928,000

Students and staff
- District mascot: Bison
- Colors: Blue and White

Other information
- Website: northcolonie.org

North Colonie Central Schools is a public school district located in Colonie, New York. It shares Colonie along with the South Colonie Central School District and covers the communities of Latham, Loudonville, and Cohoes. It was ranked the number 4 school district in the Capital District by The Business Review in their 2012 Schools Report. On the official website of North Colonie, it is stated that over 6,000 students attend the school district.

== Schools ==
The district is made up of 6 elementary schools for students in kindergarten through 5th grade. 6th, 7th and 8th grade students attend Shaker Middle School, which feeds Shaker High School for grades 9 through 12.

The district contains the following schools:

- Southgate Elementary School, Loudonville, Principal - Jerri Lynne Dedrick
- Latham Ridge Elementary School, Latham, Principal - Aaron Thiell
- Loudonville Elementary School, Loudonville, Principal - Scott Thompson
- Forts Ferry Elementary School, Latham, Principal - Casey Parker
- Boght Hills Elementary School, Cohoes, Principal - Hilary King
- Blue Creek Elementary School, Latham, Principal - Christopher Turcio
- Shaker Middle School, Latham, Principal - Davis Chamberlain
- Shaker High School, Latham, Principal - Crystal Fox
