= Horace Silliman =

American businessman (1825–1910)

Horace Brinsmade Silliman
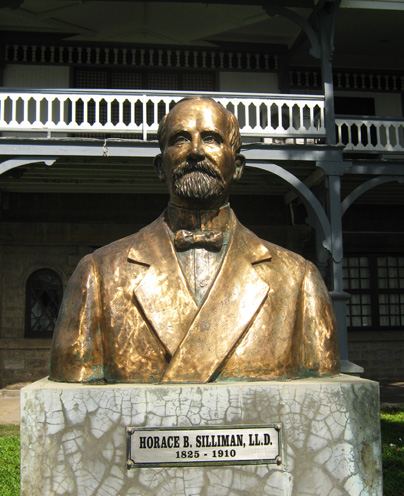
- Philanthropist
- Born: December 3, 1825; Albany, New York
- Died: May 4, 1910 (aged 84); Cohoes, New York
- Monuments: Silliman University, Dumaguete, Philippines
- Education: The Albany Academy; Union College
- Organization(s): Presbyterian Church; YMCA; Phi Beta Kappa Society

Horace Brinsmade Silliman (December 3, 1825 – May 4, 1910) was a businessman and philanthropist from Cohoes, New York and an active layman in the Presbyterian Church. He gave a $10,000 gift to start Silliman Institute, which later became Silliman University, in Dumaguete, Philippines. Silliman was known for his philanthropy and active involvement in the civic community.

== Early life ==
Born on 3 December 1825, Horace B. Silliman was the only one of six children to survive to adulthood. He was educated at The Albany Academy, Albany, New York, and graduated from Union College, in Schenectady, New York in 1846, as a member of Phi Beta Kappa Society. Later, Silliman received honorary degrees from Union College and Hamilton College. Hamilton College, at one time, offered him its presidency, but he declined.

== Career ==
Following graduation from Union College, Silliman became a druggist, opening a shop on Remsen Street in Cohoes. His interest in business was shared by his father whose local business ventures included the Simmons Axe Factory and Rathbone & Silliman, makers of iron furnaces. In 1849, Silliman & Stephen C. Miller purchased a newspaper, and established the Cohoes Cataract; Silliman was publisher until 1851. Silliman accumulated a large fortune in the halcyon days of the Industrial Revolution. He was a stockholder in several mills in Cohoes and served on a committee to consider water usage by the mills, resulting in the construction of a new reservoir in 1857 and a reliable water system.

Throughout his life, Silliman generously gave of his time and wealth to Cohoes. He was a leader in organizing a school district in Cohoes in 1849. He worked to improve the community cemetery grounds and participated in efforts to distribute relief to the poor and establish a soup kitchen. He was elected first president of the Cohoes Chapter of the YMCA in 1858, and later served as vice-president. During the Civil War, Silliman took a prominent role in meetings discussing the community’s contribution to the war effort and in the raising of troops. He was active in the work of soldiers’ relief, during and after the war, and gave the welcome address for volunteers returning from the war.

Silliman worked with the Harmony Company in coordinating the purchase of a fire engine and was chosen as first president of the C. H. Adams Steamer Company. He introduced a bill to obtain water for additional industrial power, and became Trustee of the Waterworks Sinking Fund and one of its first officials in 1870. He served on a committee to establish the Cohoes Hospital, and in later years, his generosity permitted the hospital to construct two large additions. Because of his prominence in the community, Silliman was selected to deliver the address at the dedication of City Hall in 1895.

Like his parents, Silliman was active in the church, and served in 1876 as superintendent of the Presbyterian Church Sunday School. Church services were held in the Silliman home on Saratoga Street until a church was erected on the corner of Remsen and Factory Streets. Silliman helped fund the Silliman Memorial Church, in Cohoes, constructed in 1896 in memory of his parents, Levi and Clarissa. This Romanesque revival church stood on the corner of Mohawk and Ontario Streets for about 100 years.

== Death and legacy ==
Silliman died on May 4, 1910 at 84. His philanthropy included funding additions to Hamilton College, in Clinton, New York, building the Silliman Lodge in New Jersey (a home for invalid girls), and establishing Silliman University in Dumaguete.

On September 23, 2010, Silliman Park (at the corner of Mohawk Street & Ontario Street) in Cohoes was re-dedicated by Mayor John T. McDonald III.
