= William J. Dickey House =

Historic house in New York, United States

- U.S. National Register of Historic Places
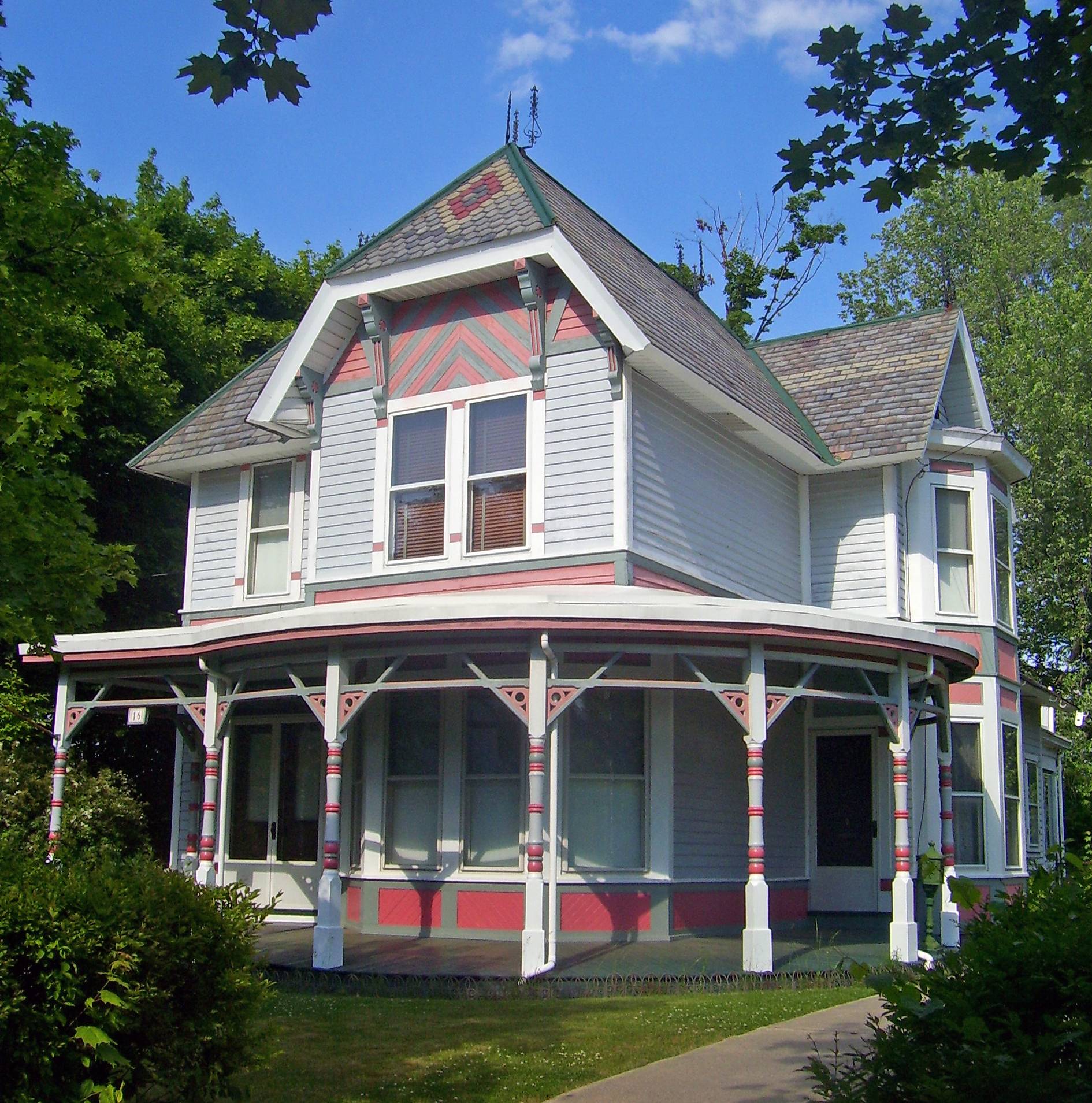
- Front (west) elevation and south profile, 2008
- Location: Cohoes, NY
- Coordinates: 42°46′17″N 73°42′21″W
- Built: 1890
- Architectural style: Stick-Eastlake
- NRHP reference No.: 98000138
- Added to NRHP: 1998

The William J. Dickey House is located on Imperial Avenue in Cohoes, New York, United States. It was built for Dickey, the superintendent of a local textile mill, in 1890, by an unknown architect.

It is a well-preserved example of local Queen Anne-style residential architecture. In 1998 it was added to the National Register of Historic Places.

== Property ==
The house is a frame two-story three-bay home with a cross-gabled roof that comes to a jerkin shape in the front (west) side. A porch wraps around the first story to the south elevation. The south bay on the front side is projecting, with Stick-style decoration between the second-story window and roofline. On the south side is another projecting two-story bay with similarly tall bay window. The north profile features a round-arched stained glass window that illuminates a staircase.

The interior retains much of the original finishing. Most noteworthy among it is the wall plaster, architraves and door surrounds.

In the rear of the property is a small barn with clapboard siding and a gabled roof. It is considered a contributing resource and is now the house's garage.

== History ==
Imperial Avenue was one of the first streets laid out after Cohoes reincorporated as a city in 1869 and extended the municipal boundary to the west, opening up possibilities for new homes for the city's managerial class. It runs across the top of a sharp rise a mile west of downtown. Dickey's house is at the highest point on the street.

The Cohoes Daily News of March 1, 1890, reported on Dickey's move into his new house. He and his wife, having taken up residence a few days previously, received a surprise visit from their friends, who gave them a hanging lamp as a housewarming gift.

Ten years later, in the early 20th century, the stained glass window was put in. There have been no other significant alterations to the house since then. It remains a private residence today.
