= J. Leonard Lackman House =

Historic house in New York, United States

- U.S. National Register of Historic Places
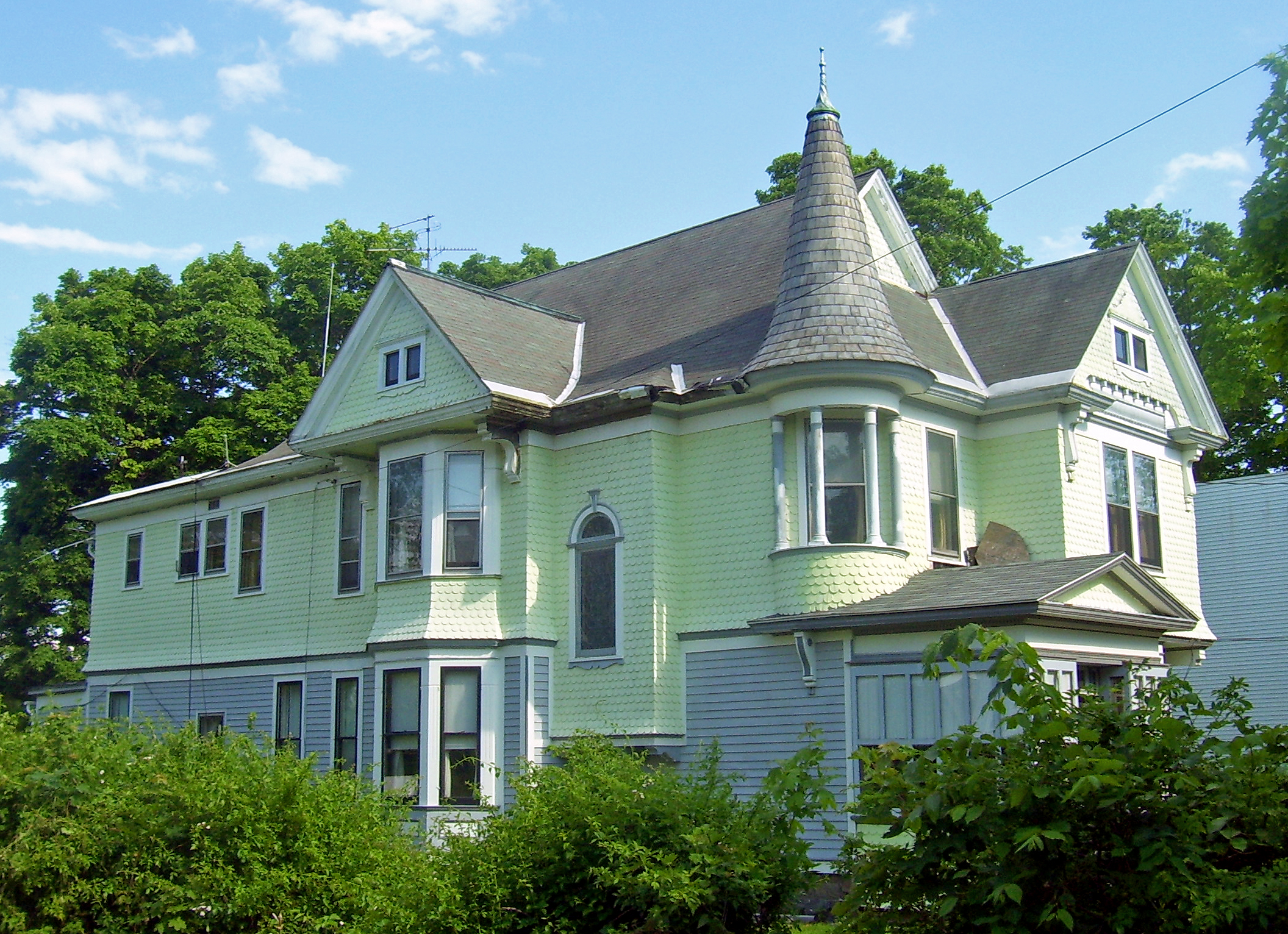
- North profile and west (front) elevation, 2008
- Location: Cohoes, NY
- Coordinates: 42°46′16″N 73°42′21″W
- Built: 1895
- Architectural style: Queen Anne
- NRHP reference No.: 98000136
- Added to NRHP: 1998

The J. Leonard Lackman House is located on Imperial Avenue in Cohoes, New York, United States. Lackman was a local gunsmith and locksmith. His descendants still own and reside in the house as of 2009.

It was built in the late 19th century in the then-popular Queen Anne architectural style. In 1998 it was added to the National Register of Historic Places.

== Building ==
The house is a two-story, two-bay wood frame dwelling on a stone foundation. The first story is sided in clapboard; the second in imbricate shingle, flaring out at the floor line slightly. Both are currently painted different colors. The roof is steeply pitched and gabled.

The mass of the house is broken up on every side in different ways, most noticeably at the front. The facade there, facing the street to the west, features the entrance's double wooden doors inside an enclosed porch on the north bay. It in turn has a pedimented roof. Above it rises a small turret with a window in the chamfered north and west and columns that rise to support a steep conical spirelet. To the south of the porch is a large, projecting bay window. This is topped with an overhanging bay on the second story and then the overhanging gabled dormer above it, bracketed by carved swags.

On the north, the profile is broken by a projecting bay as well, on both stories, supporting another gable with carved swag brackets. A nearby stair bay is lit by a round-topped stained glass window. The south elevation features an enclosed brick porch with corbeled columns supporting a frieze at the flared roofline. Another porch, this time wooden, is on the east (rear) facade, which offers a view over downtown Cohoes and the Hudson River.

The interior has seen little change. Many of its decorative features survive, such as the wall plaster, door surrounds, architraves, patterned metal ceilings and mantels. The entry hall, its newel-posted stairway lit by the stained-glass window on the north profile, has an inlaid parquet floor, delicate fireplace and mantel.
