= Olmstead Street Historic District =

Historic district in New York, United States

- U.S. National Register of Historic Places
- U.S. Historic district
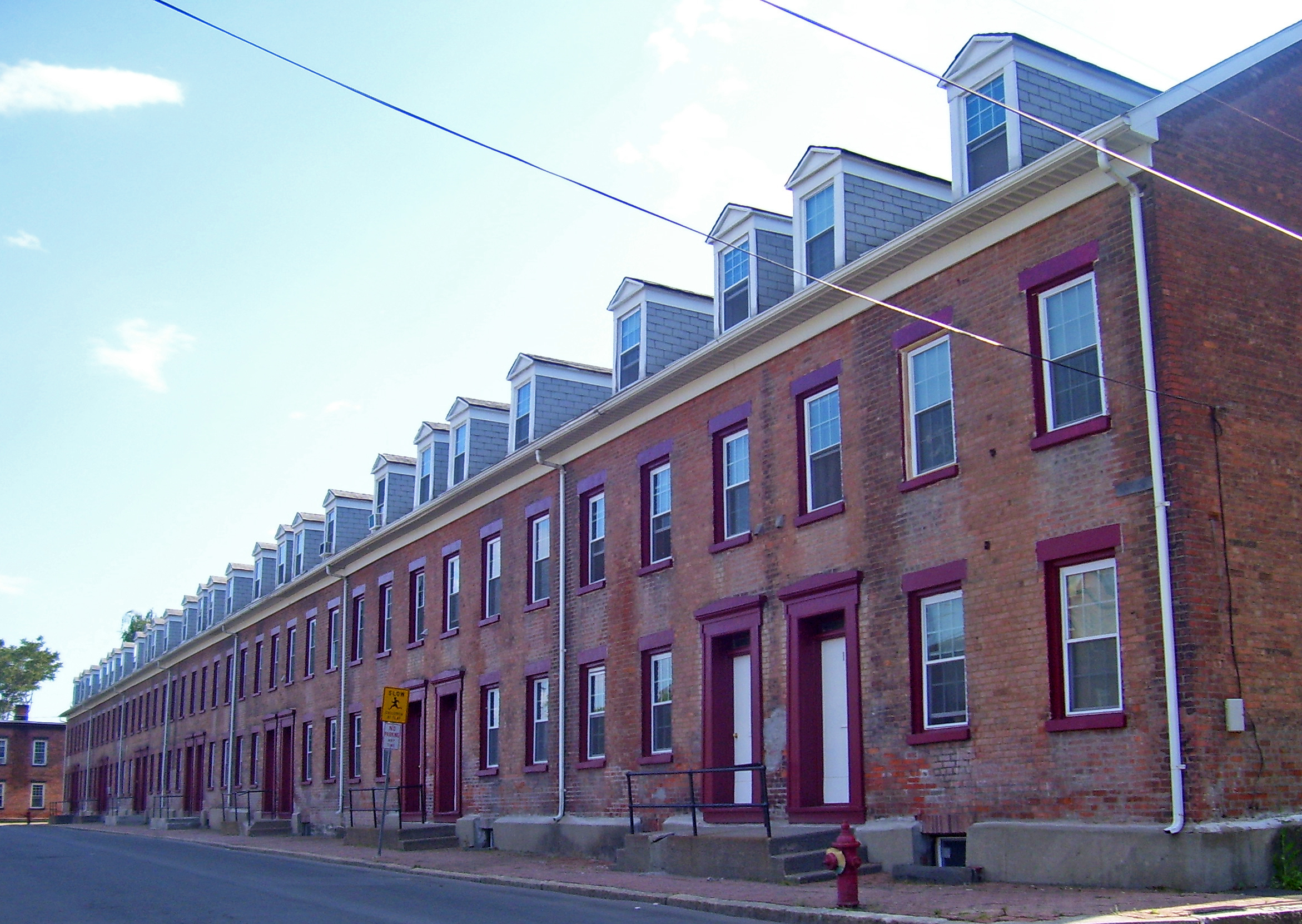
- Southerly view along west side of Olmstead Street from Cayuga Street, 2008

- Location within New York Location within the United States
- Location: Cohoes, NY
- Coordinates: 42°46′29″N 73°42′10″W
- Area: 10 acres (4 ha)
- Built: 1840s
- NRHP reference No.: 73001159
- Added to NRHP: 1973

The Olmstead Street Historic District is located along two blocks of that street in Cohoes, New York, United States. It is a microcosm of the city's economy at its peak in the mid- to late 19th century, consisting of a former textile mill complex, a filled-in section of the original Erie Canal, and three long blocks of row houses built for the millworkers.

It was added to the National Register of Historic Places in 1973. Today the row houses still serve as affordable housing.

== Properties ==
The district is defined as both sides of Olmstead Street between Cayuga and Ontario (also NY 470) streets. This area is just to the northwest of the larger Downtown Cohoes Historic District.

The 18 buildings included in this 10-acre (4 ha) area are the houses and the former Ogden Mills complex, with its own parking lot, known as Ogden Mills Plaza. Between the street and the plaza is a grassy strip that was part of the original alignment of the Erie Canal. Today it has been made into a park, with playgrounds and other facilities.

The mill complex consists of three sections. The north and south wings are both three and a half stories tall with gabled roofs, corbeled cornices and a square tower rising from their 24-bay west facades. The seven-bay central section, built later, comes to a full four stories. Both of its facades project slightly. It has a low-pitched gable roof and a modillioned cornice. There are two outbuildings.

The rowhouses across the street are in three blocks. All are three stories high and built of brick on rubblestone foundations, but there are some differences. The longest is the northernmost, at 42 bays. It has dormer windows and stone-trimmed windows. It extends from Cayuga to Van Vechten Street, where the 15-bay middle block begins on the opposite corner. Its buildings are flat-roofed and have wood-trimmed windows. Connected to it at its south end is the 18-bay south block, with gabled roofs, seven chimneys and a corbeled cornice.

== History ==
In the late 1830s, the Erie Canal (built two decades earlier) had become so successful that its management found it necessary to build the Enlarged Erie Canal to handle larger vessels. They abandoned the original route for one that ran to the west of the present-day city. The Cohoes Company, which operated a smaller, local canal system that provided water power to the industry attracted to the area by the canal, took over the former route.

The company built the north and south sections of the mill first, in 1844 and 1846 respectively. The houses were built across a new street named for company agent Charles A. Olmstead, who had supervised the original power canal construction. By 1847 the Ogden Mills were the city's leading producer of woven cotton.

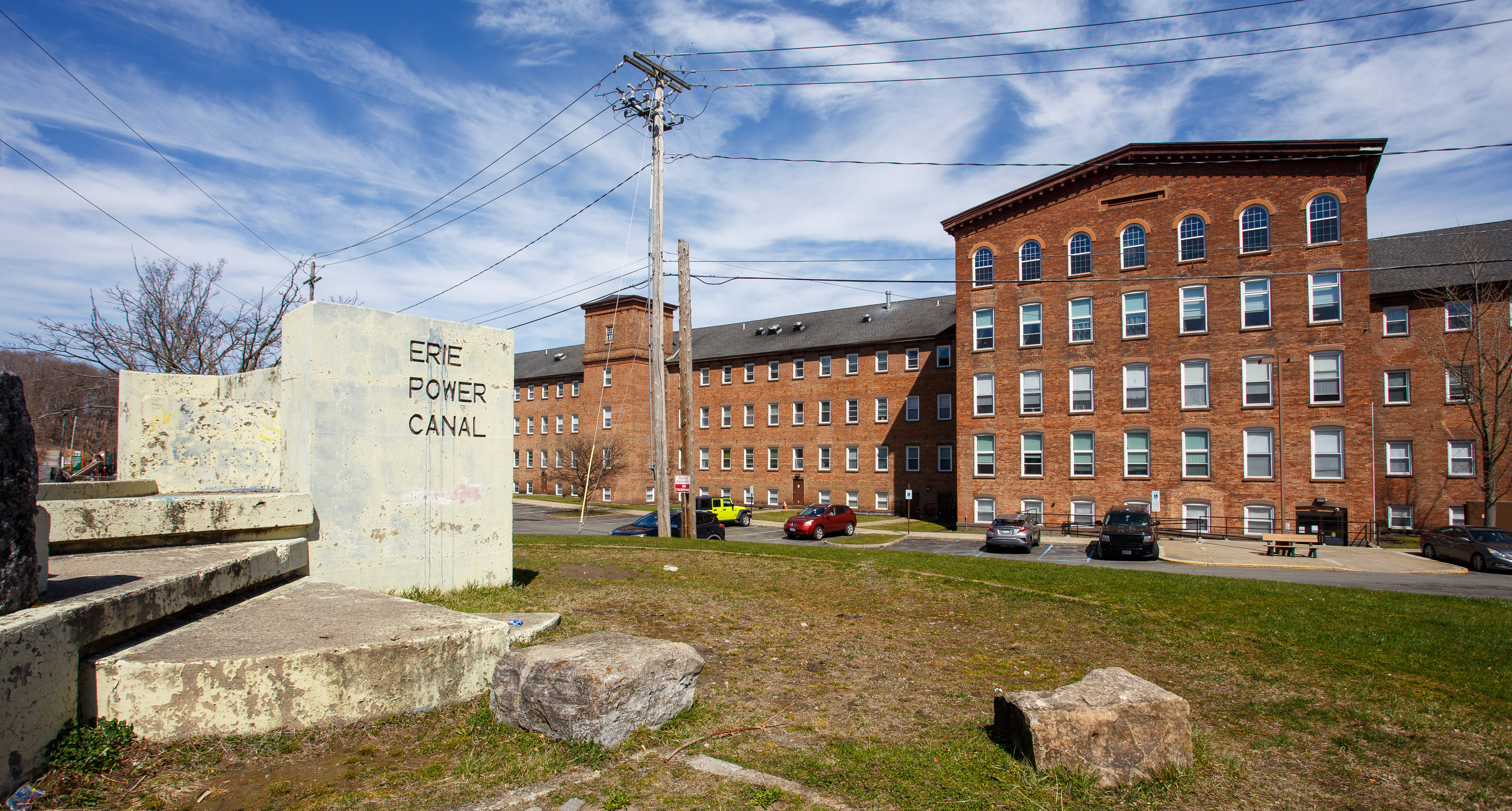
Ogden Mill

That changed quickly. An 1849 strike over a 15% wage cut ended after three weeks when workers feared losing their jobs to replacements that Olmstead had advertised for, but the company failed in 1851. Harmony Mills bought the plant and expanded it in 1859 with the middle section. By the later years of the century it was part of one of the largest cotton-production actions in the country.

The mill continued to be used for clothing manufacture until the late 20th century. Today it has been converted into a mixed-use complex with apartments, retail and office space. The house blocks are now Section 8 affordable housing.
