= Cohoes City Hall =

Municipal building in New York, United States

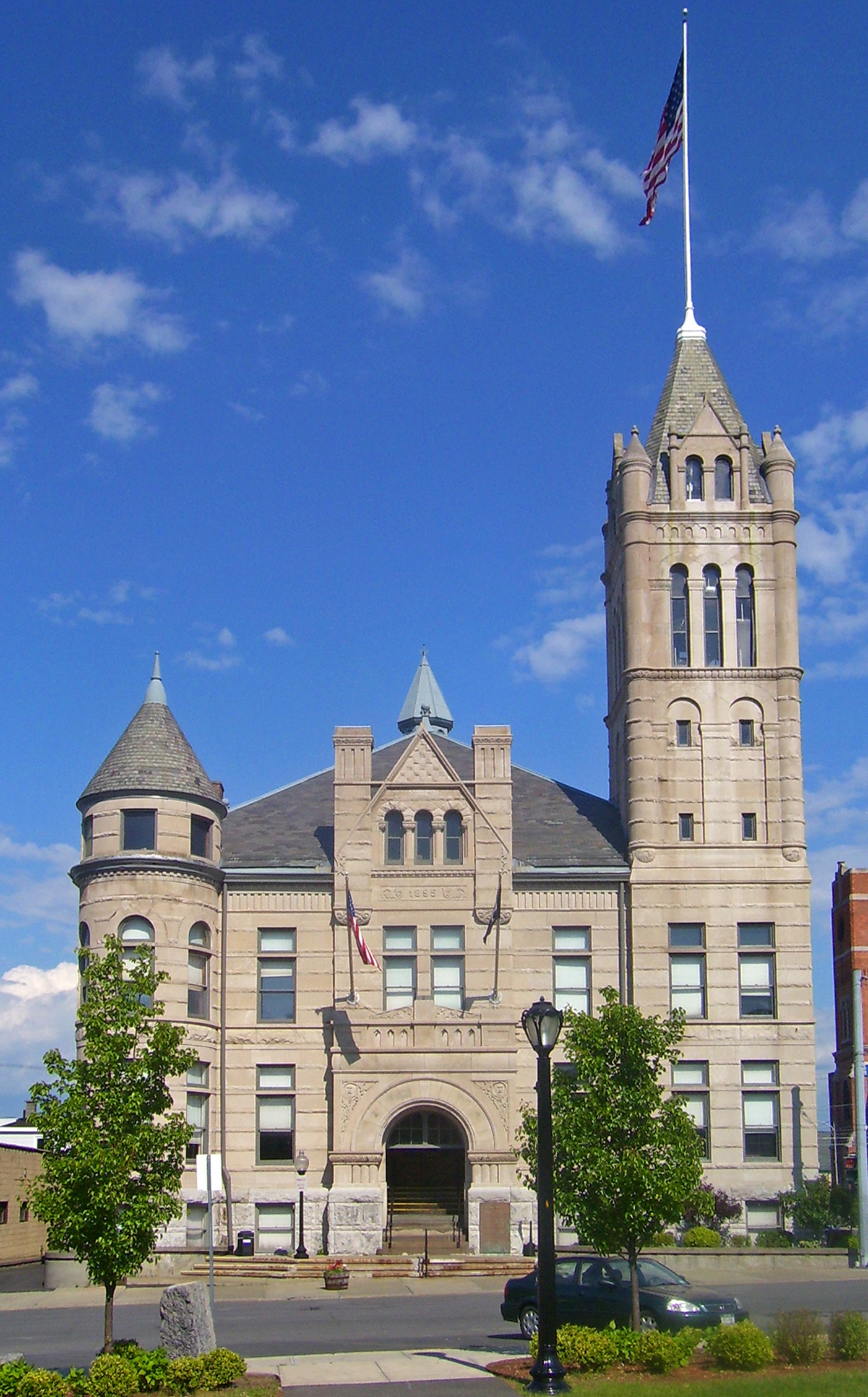
- Front elevation, 2008
- Interactive map of the Cohoes City Hall area

General information
- Type: Municipal
- Architectural style: Chateauesque/Romanesque Revival
- Location: 97 Mohawk St., Cohoes, NY, United States
- Coordinates: 42.774598°N 73.699615°W
- Completed: 1896
- Cost: $63,000
- Owner: City of Cohoes

Design and construction
- Architect: J.C. Holland

Cohoes City Hall is located at 97 Mohawk Street in the city of Cohoes, New York, United States. It combines elements of the Chateauesque and Romanesque Revival architectural styles popular when it was built in 1896. J.C. Fuller, the Kansas state architect at the time, was chosen for his experience in designing public buildings.

It is a contributing property to the Downtown Cohoes Historic District, listed on the National Register of Historic Places in 1984. It is symbolic of the city within the Capital District, and is used in Cohoes' current seal. The city government and police department are based in it.

It is faced in smooth ashlar limestone with alternating bands of rough stone. Its Chateauesque aspects, such as the stonework, irregular silhouette, conical-roofed towers, wall dormers and ornamental cresting with finials. The main entrance's rounded arch with support from thick, foliated columns is a distinct Romanesque touch, however.

In recent years its age has made it a difficult building to keep warm in the wintertime. Even with the windows closed, City Hall has been drafty. The city installed Cellular Shades, and later window insulating panels, to keep it warm.
