= Godfrey Farmhouse =

Historic house in New York, United States

- U.S. National Register of Historic Places
- Location within New York Location within the United States
- Nearest city: Cohoes, New York
- Coordinates: 42°48′28″N 73°44′5″W
- Area: 1 acre (0.40 ha)
- Built: 1836
- Architectural style: Greek Revival
- MPS: New York State Route 9, Town of Colonie MRA
- NRHP reference No.: 79003240
- Added to NRHP: October 4, 1979

Godfrey Farmhouse is a historic home located at Cohoes in Albany County, New York. It was built about 1836 and is a 1 1/2-story Greek Revival temple form dwelling. It features an impressive portico with fluted columns.

It was listed on the National Register of Historic Places in 1979.
