= Cohoes Music Hall =

- U.S. National Register of Historic Places
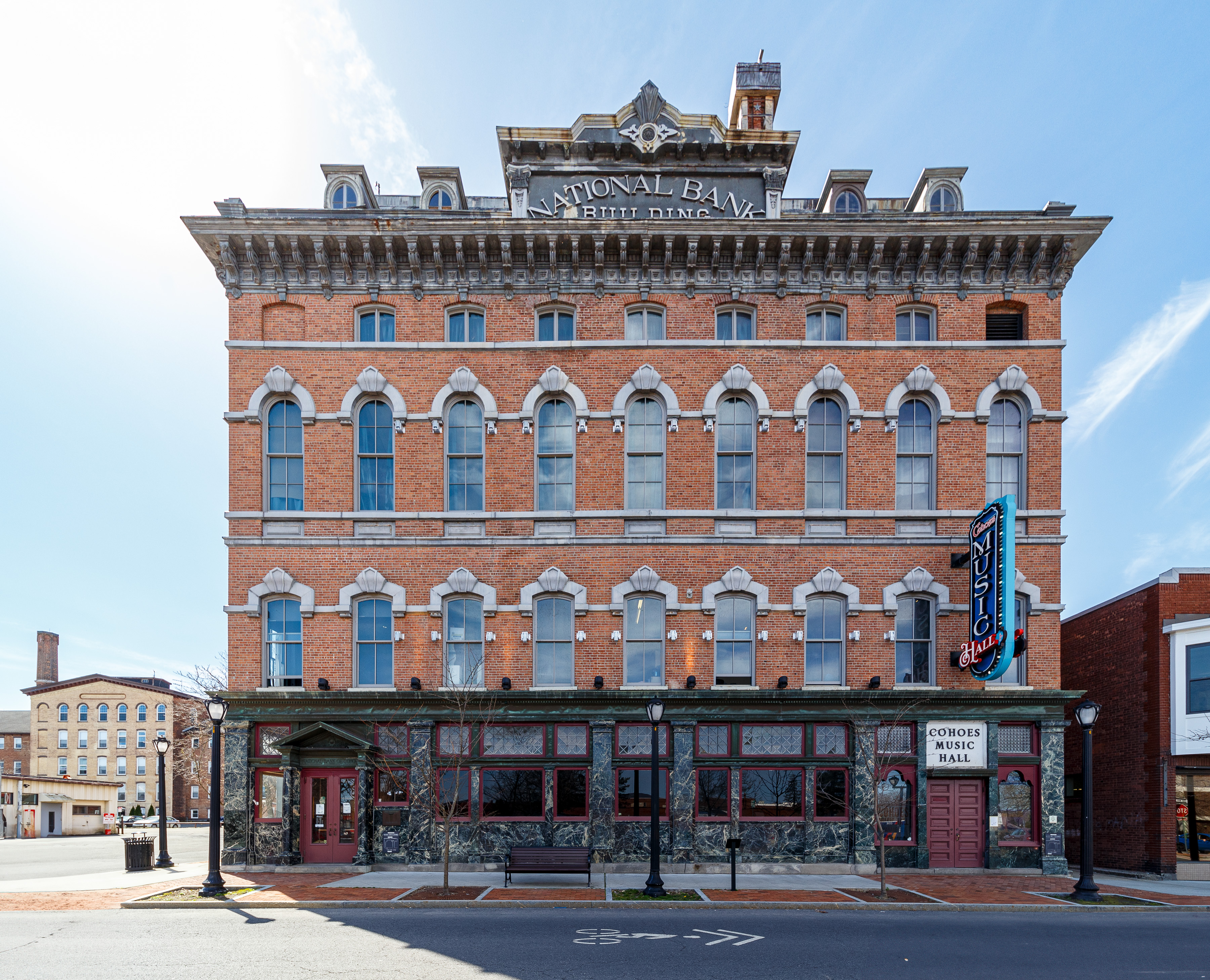
- Location: 58 Remsen Street; Cohoes, NY
- Coordinates: 42°46′32″N 73°42′06″W
- Built: 1874
- Architectural style: Second Empire
- NRHP reference No.: 71000527
- Added to NRHP: 1971

Cohoes Music Hall is a vintage music hall located at 58 Remsen Street in Cohoes, New York, United States. It is a four-story brick building in the Second Empire architectural style. Built in 1874, it is considered the best example of that style in the city, with an unusually decorative front facade.

== Register of Historical Place designation ==
In 1971, it was added to the National Register of Historic Places. 13 years later, when the Downtown Cohoes Historic District was added to the Register, the Music Hall was listed as a contributing property. After a restoration it began putting on performances again in the 1970s. It is the fourth-oldest music hall currently in use in the country, and also serves as the city's visitor center.

== Building ==
The Music Hall is nine bays wide by six deep. It is made of brick with alternating courses of limestone, a material also used for the hooded trim on the windows. The mansard roof found on many Second Empire buildings is pierced by several decorative corbeled brick chimneys. Below it is a bracketed cornice. The east (front) facade is faced in green marble at street level, making it unusually decorative for a Second Empire building and one of the most ornate in Cohoes.

Inside, the third and fourth stories host a 375-seat auditorium, with a balcony on the upper level. Much of the original interior furnishings and decor remains.

== History ==
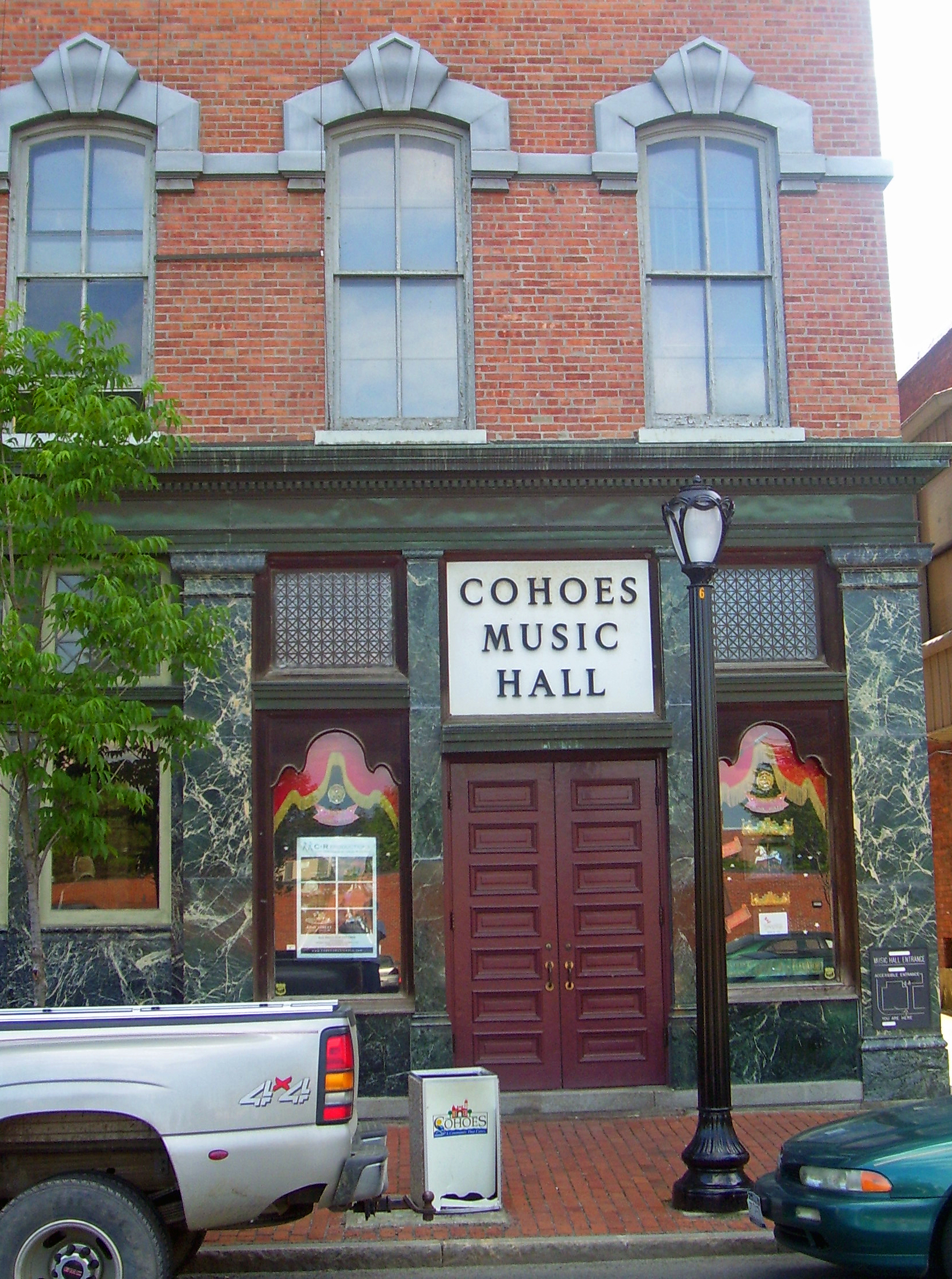
Entrance

Two local businessmen, newspaper owner James Masten and miller William Acheson, partnered to build the Music Hall in 1874. Nichols and Halcott of nearby Albany designed and built it for a cost of $60,000. It opened with a performance of Dion Boucicault's London Assurance.

They leased the space on the ground floors to stores and other businesses to provide extra income, starting with the local post office. Two years later the city's library rented some space on the second story. In 1878 Masten sold his interest to Mary Acheson for 25 cents, because he felt the local market was oversaturated. Performers who played the building over the years included Sarah Bernhardt, Buffalo Bill Cody, George M. Cohan, Jimmy Durante, Lillian Russell, John Philip Sousa, General Tom Thumb and then-Cohoes native Eva Tanguay (supposedly booed on her first appearance).

In 1880 the First National Bank moved into the first floor. By 1905, it had taken over ownership of the building, putting its name on the entablature at the roofline. They closed the theater after discovering one of the roof trusses was sagging.

By the middle of the 20th century, as the city declined along with its textile industries and the Erie Canal, the Music Hall had begun to deteriorate and fall into disuse. It became city property for $1 in 1969, and was in danger of being demolished just before it was added to the Register. An extensive restoration allowed to reopen a year after its centenary, with another production of London Assurance.

The Music Hall has been managed by a number of organizations throughout the early 21st Century, including CR Productions and Albany's Palace Performing Arts Center.

Currently, the street-level area serves as the city's visitor center, with displays on the history of the textile industry in the city and information about historic sites and other local attractions.

Cohoes Music Hall is now managed by Playhouse Stage Company (Park Playhouse, Inc.). The venue plays host to Playhouse Stage musical theatre productions, as well as a wide variety of live music, stand-up comedy and other performing arts and civic events.
