= Fonda House =

Historic house in New York, United States

- U.S. National Register of Historic Places
- Location within New York Location within the United States
- Location: 55 Western Ave., Cohoes, New York
- Coordinates: 42°46′9″N 73°43′41″W
- Area: 1 acre (0.40 ha)
- Built: 1727
- Architectural style: Colonial
- NRHP reference No.: 04000351
- Added to NRHP: April 21, 2004

Fonda House is a historic home located at Cohoes in Albany County, New York. It was built about 1727 and is a rectangular 1 1/2-story, three-by-two-bay center entrance brick dwelling with a gambrel roof. It features a single-story wraparound porch.

It was listed on the National Register of Historic Places in 2004.
