= Cohoes, New York =

Cohoes, New York Kahón:ios
- City
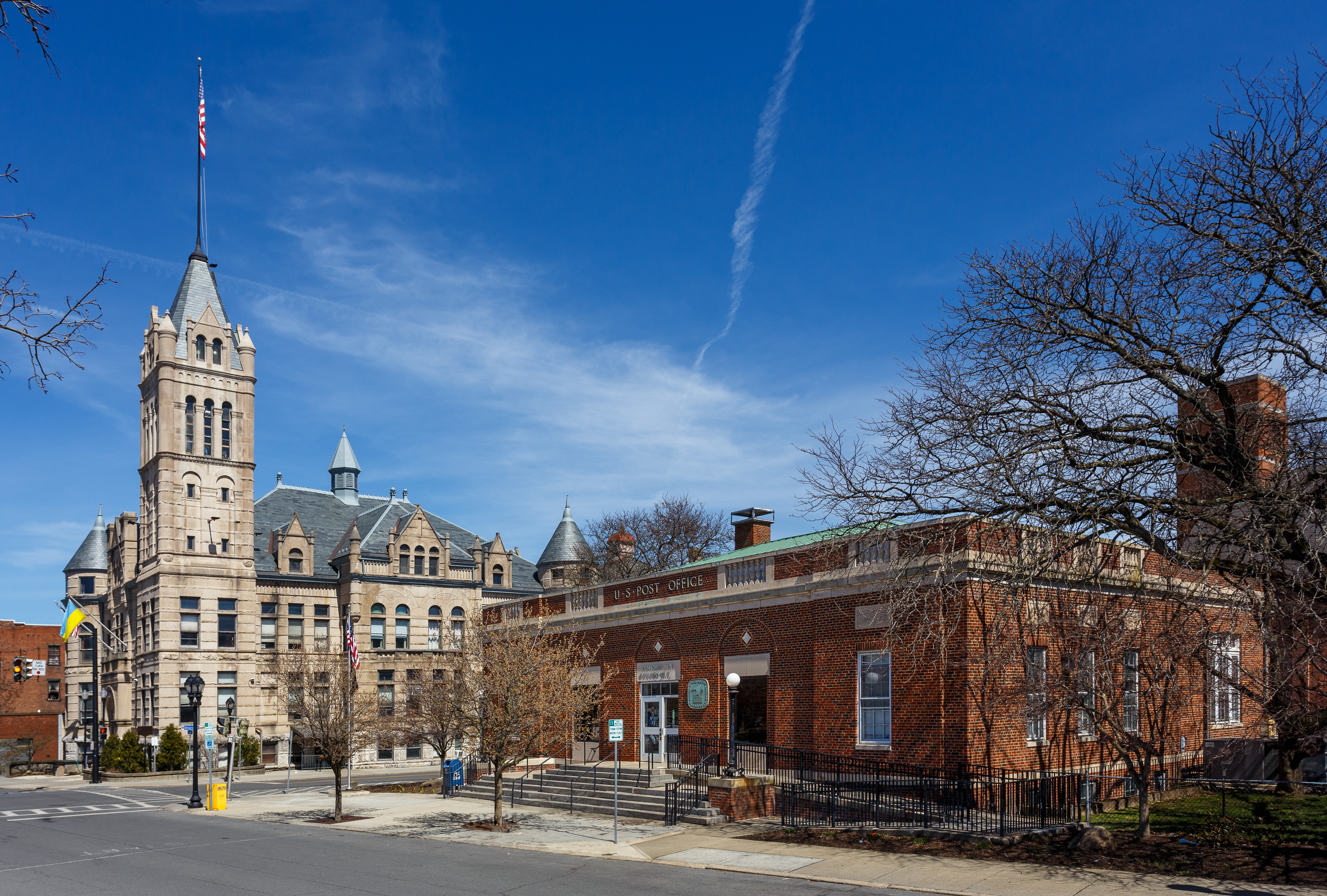
- City Hall and Post Office

- Seal Logo
- Etymology: Dutch adaptation of Mohawk Ga-ha-oose for 'place of the falling canoe'
- Nickname: Spindle City
- Motto: A Community That Cares
- Location in Albany County and the state of New York.

- Location of New York in the United States
- Coordinates: 42°46′45″N 73°42′46″W
- Country: United States
- State: New York
- County: Albany
- Incorporation as village: 1848
- Incorporation as city: 1869

Government
  - Type: City Hall
  - Mayor: Bill Keeler (D) Common Council: W1: Nicholas Izzo; W2: Shawn Higgins; W3: George Soloyna; W4: William McCarthy; W5: Adam Biggs (Council President); W6: April Trudeau

Area
  - Total: 4.24 sq mi (10.97 km^{2})
  - Land: 3.77 sq mi (9.77 km^{2})
  - Water: 0.46 sq mi (1.20 km^{2})
- Elevation: 80 ft (24 m)
- Highest elevation (Elizabeth Court): 310 ft (94 m)
- Lowest elevation (Hudson River): 10 ft (3.0 m)

Population (2020)
  - Total: 18,147
  - Density: 4,810.1/sq mi (1,857.18/km^{2})
- Demonym: Cohoesier
- Time zone: UTC-5 (Eastern (EST))
  - Summer (DST): UTC-4 (EDT)
- ZIP Code: 12047
- Area code: 518
- FIPS code: 36-16749
- GNIS feature ID: 0947009
- Wikimedia Commons: Cohoes, New York
- Website: City of Cohoes

Cohoes (/kəˈhoʊz/ kə-HOHZ) is an incorporated city located in the northeast corner of Albany County in the U.S. state of New York. It is called the "Spindle City" because of the importance of textile manufacturing to its growth in the 19th century. The city's factories processed cotton from the Deep South. Like other major textile manufacturing centers in the Northeast United States, the labor needs of the city's textile mills were supplied by immigrants, especially French Canadians from Québec, who made up more than 30% of its total population by 1881. French remained widely spoken as a native language in Cohoes until the late 20th century.

As of the 2020 census, the city population was 18,174. The name Cohoes is believed to be derived from a Mohawk term, Kahón:ios, referring to the Cohoes Falls and meaning 'Place of the Falling Canoe', an interpretation noted by Horatio Gates Spafford in his 1823 publication "A Gazetteer of the State of New York". Later historians posited that the name is derived from the Algonquian Cohoes, a place name based on a word meaning 'pine tree'.

== History ==
In the early years of Dutch colonial settlement, the majority of the city's territory was once part of the area of Manor of Rensselaerswyck, a feudal-style manor or patroonship. The land north of a line crossing the Cohoes Falls (today Manor Avenue) was outside the Manor and was owned by the Van Olohde family between 1725 and 1750. Rensselaerswyck was established by Killiaen Van Rensselaer, the patroon and a Dutch merchant. In 1632, he had an agent pace off an enormous triangle-shaped area around the confluence of the Mohawk and Hudson rivers, from the Peebles Island northwest to the Cohoes Falls and south to today's Watervliet; this area was the core of the future city of Cohoes. Starting in the 1690s the Patroon began to issue leases for the area of Cohoes, reserving for himself a strip below the Cohoes Falls for the future site of mills powered by water.

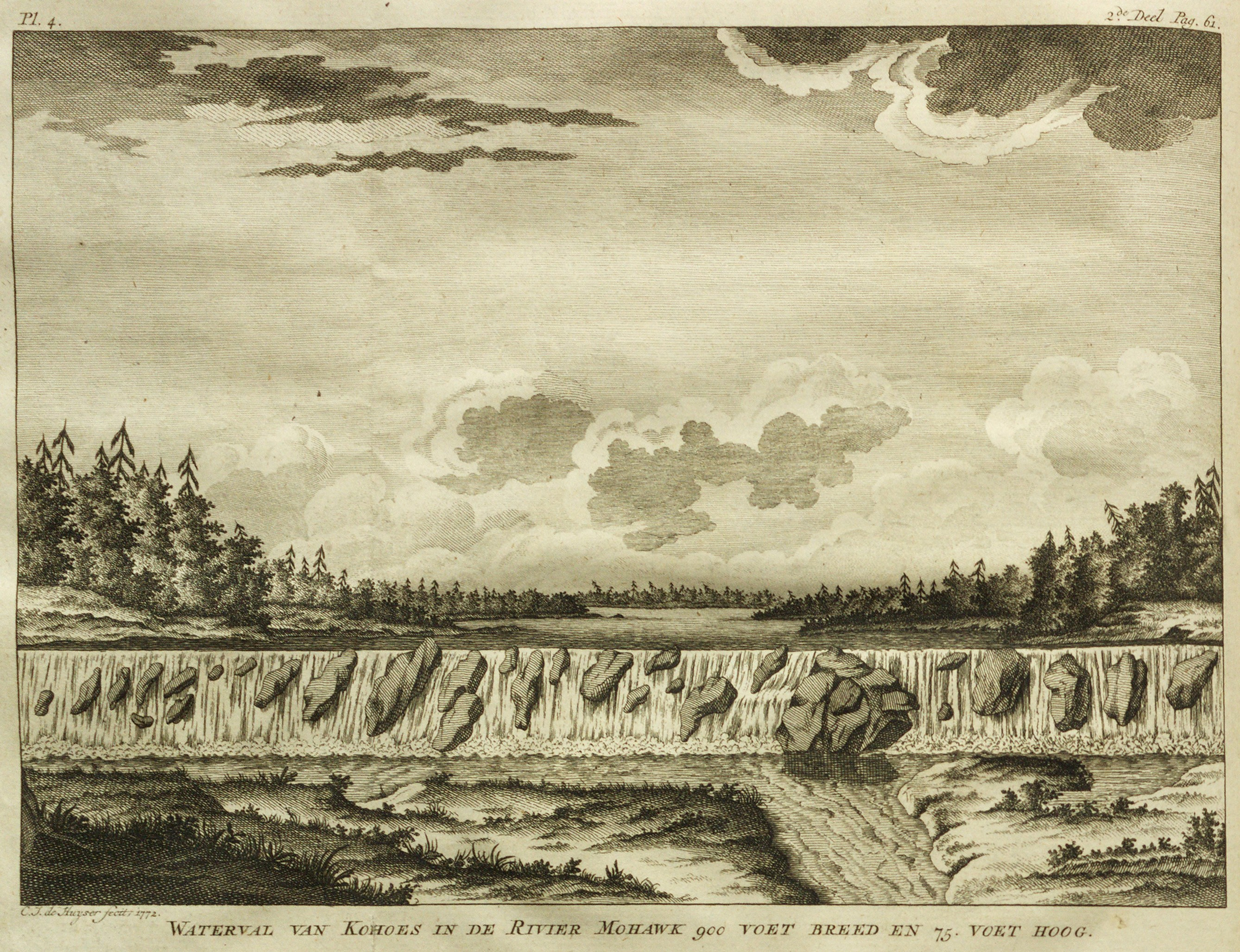
Kohoes Falls, 1772

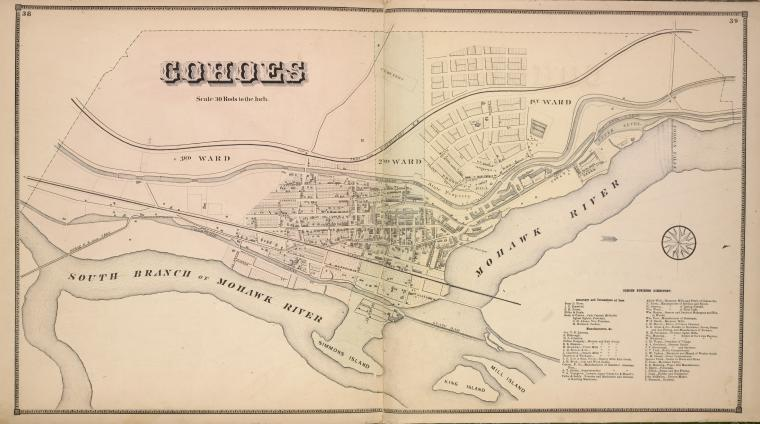
Map of the village of Cohoes in 1866. North is to the right.

Though the area was not much settled for a time, it was known for the Cohoes Falls. One of the earliest descriptions of the falls was in 1642 by Johannes Megapolensis, the first dominie (Dutch Reformed pastor) of Beverwyck. Another early description was in 1656 by Adriaen van der Donck in his Description of New Netherland. In the early-to-mid 17th century, a whale swam upriver in the Hudson, becoming stranded in the Mohawk River on an island just below the Cohoes Falls. The Dutch settlers could not easily get to the large carcass to remove it. As it rotted, the river became slick for three weeks. A settler commented that "the air was infected with its stench... perceptible for two miles to leeward." Beginning about 1646, settlers called this land Whale Island.

During the various French and Indian Wars of the mid-18th century, Van Schaick Island was developed as part of a military road that came from Albany north along the islands at the mouth of the Mohawk River. These islands allowed for easier fords across the various mouths of the Mohawk and access to Waterford and points north. The islands were used for numerous military encampments during both the French and Indian Wars and the American Revolutionary War.

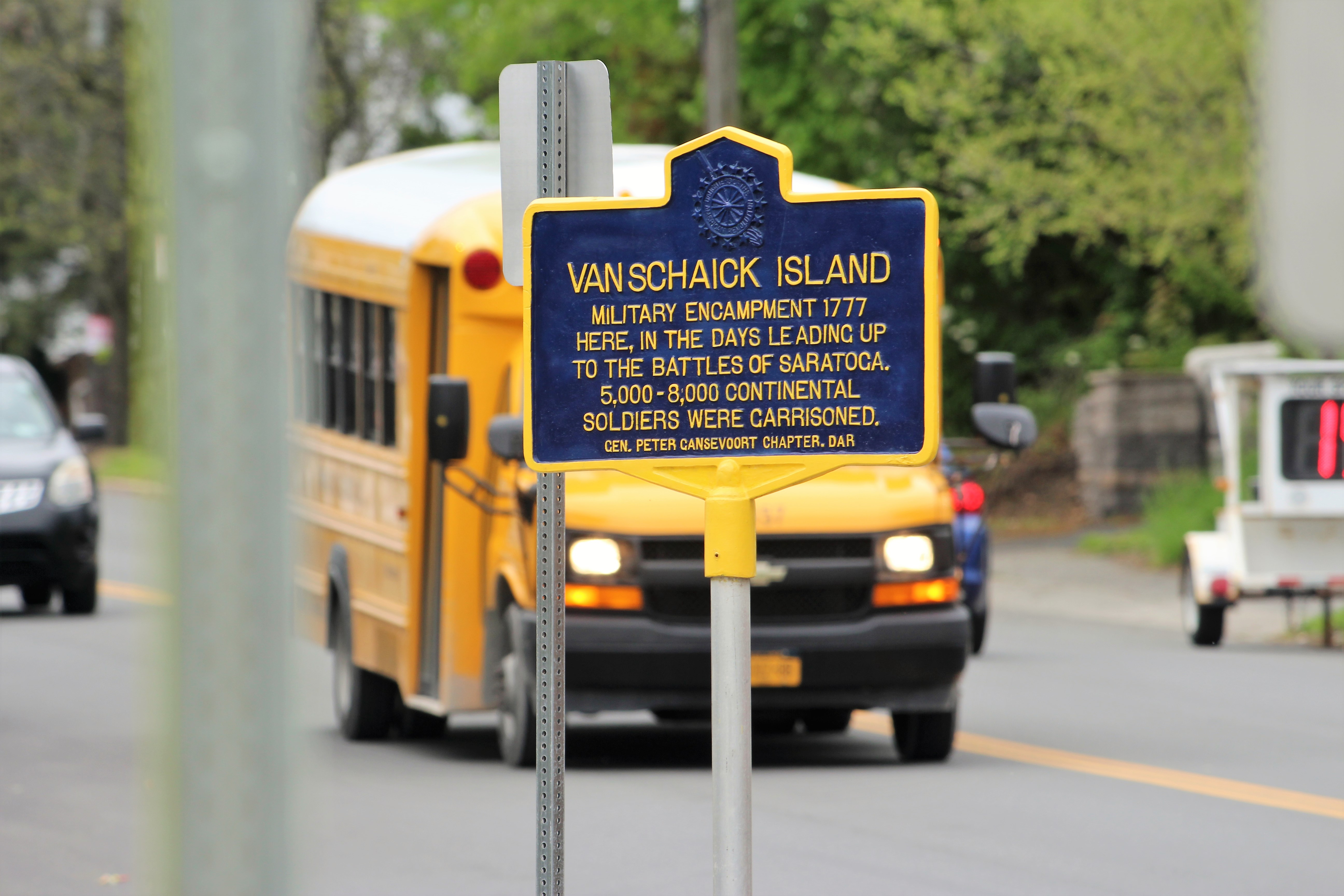
A New York State historical marker for Van Schaick Island, part of the city of Cohoes. The marker is located near the intersection of Delaware Avenue and Ontario Street.

The Van Schaick Mansion on Van Schaick Island was built in the 1730s; it was one of the sites used as a military headquarters during the Revolution by the Americans under Major Generals Philip Schuyler and Horatio Gates. Van Schaick Island was the first part of Cohoes to be settled and farmed; it was formerly known as Cohoes Island and Anthony's Island.

=== Growth ===
Until after the Revolutionary War, Cohoes was a small quiet hamlet with isolated farms. After the Mohawk and other Iroquois allies of the British were forced to cede their territory, New York encouraged new settlement. Thousands of Yankee settlers came from New England. Cohoes was linked to the larger settlements of Lansingburg and Albany. In 1795 the first bridge across the Mohawk River was constructed at Cohoes. It was 900 feet long, 24 feet wide, 15 feet high, and was based on 13 stone piers. It cost $12,000 to build and was a toll bridge. This bridge provided access to Cohoes as one of the main routes north. The bridge was rebuilt in 1806 by the Cohoes Bridge Company, which raised the tolls to cover the cost.

Another major transportation improvement, construction of the Erie and Champlain canals were begun in 1817. The section in Cohoes was finished in 1823, stimulating trade for the city. Cohoes was known as Juncta because of being served by the two canals, which improved water traffic north to Lake Champlain and west through the Mohawk Valley. One or both of the canals crossed every farm in Cohoes. Even with the canals and the bridge bringing easier access to larger markets, Cohoes was a sleepy place prior to 1831. The nearest post office was at Waterford; fresh meat and produce were available mostly by residents raising their own. A United States post office was built in Cohoes in 1831.

=== Industrial age ===
In 1811 the Cohoes Manufacturing Company, owned entirely by men from Lansingburg, was incorporated and began a factory for making screws. This was the first large industry in Cohoes to use the power of the Mohawk River and Cohoes Falls.

In 1831, a new Cohoes Company constructed a dam on the Mohawk River above the city's waterfall in order to better regulate water flow for industrial use. It was soon swept away by ice at the break-up in spring, and a new dam was built the following year. Two canals extended from the dam to provide water power for industry. Ironworks were the first main industry in Cohoes, as it was in Troy, Menands, and West Troy. Daniel Simmons' Simmons Axe Company was famous throughout the United States, and the Cohoes Iron Foundry was a large business enterprise in the 1830s.

=== Textile industry ===
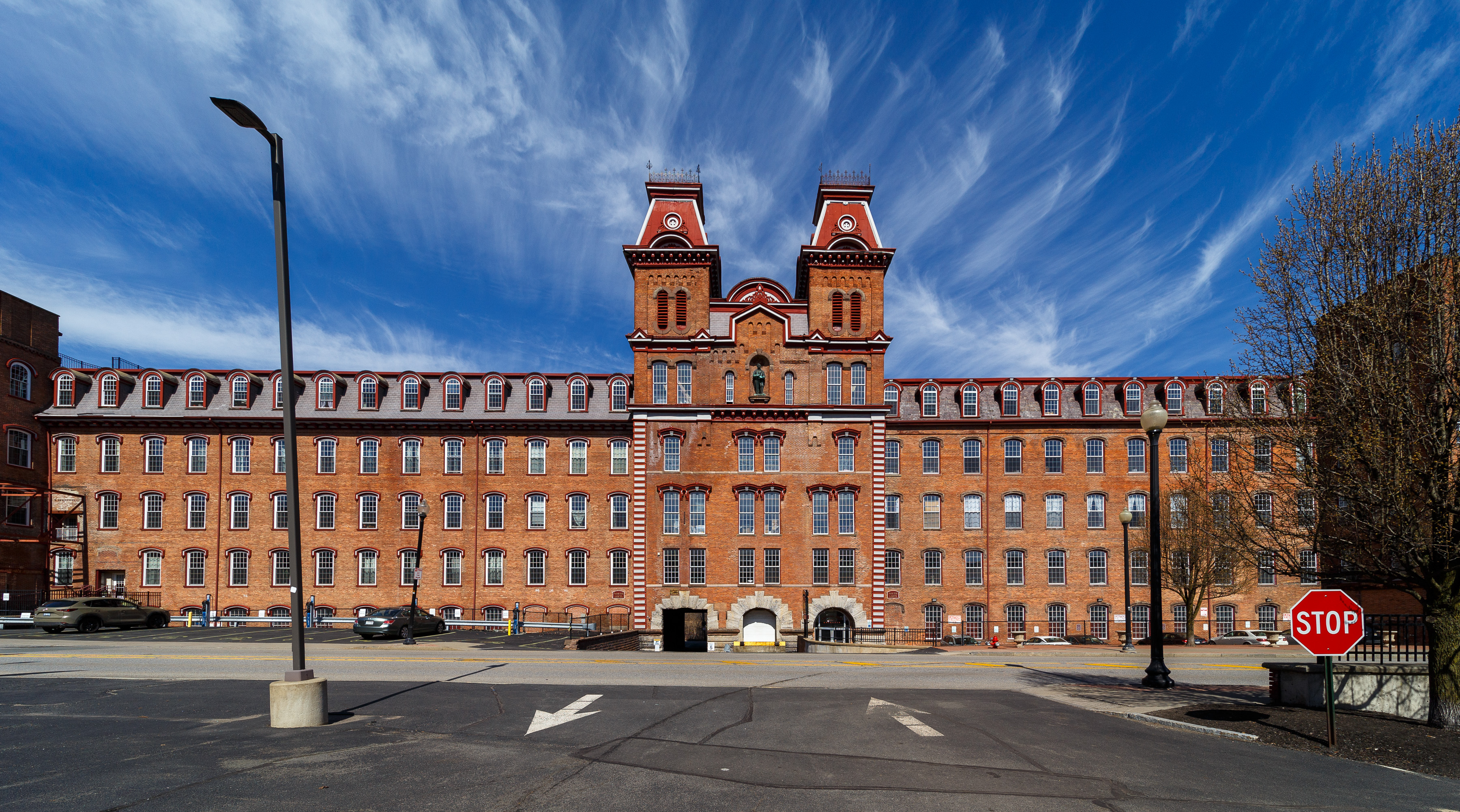
Harmony Mill No. 3 was the largest individual cotton factory in the world when it opened in 1872

In the 1820s, the first cotton mill in Albany County was built in Cohoes. Egberts and Bailey was the first factory to use knitting machinery run by power, based on the Cohoes Company's power canals.

The community became a center of textile manufacturing; in 1836 the Harmony Manufacturing Company was founded, later famous as Harmony Mills. Cohoes became a mill town, and to an extent a company town. During the 1870s the mills were enormously profitable because of the Erie Canal, which flowed past them at that time. Mill #3, at over 1,000 feet (300 m) long, has been considered the longest continuous textile mill in the country at the time. Cotton textiles were shipped to New York City, England and Europe, where demand was high.

In 1848, Cohoes was incorporated as a village within the town of Watervliet. In 1869, it was chartered as a city.

==== Mastodon discovery ====
Mastodon discovery

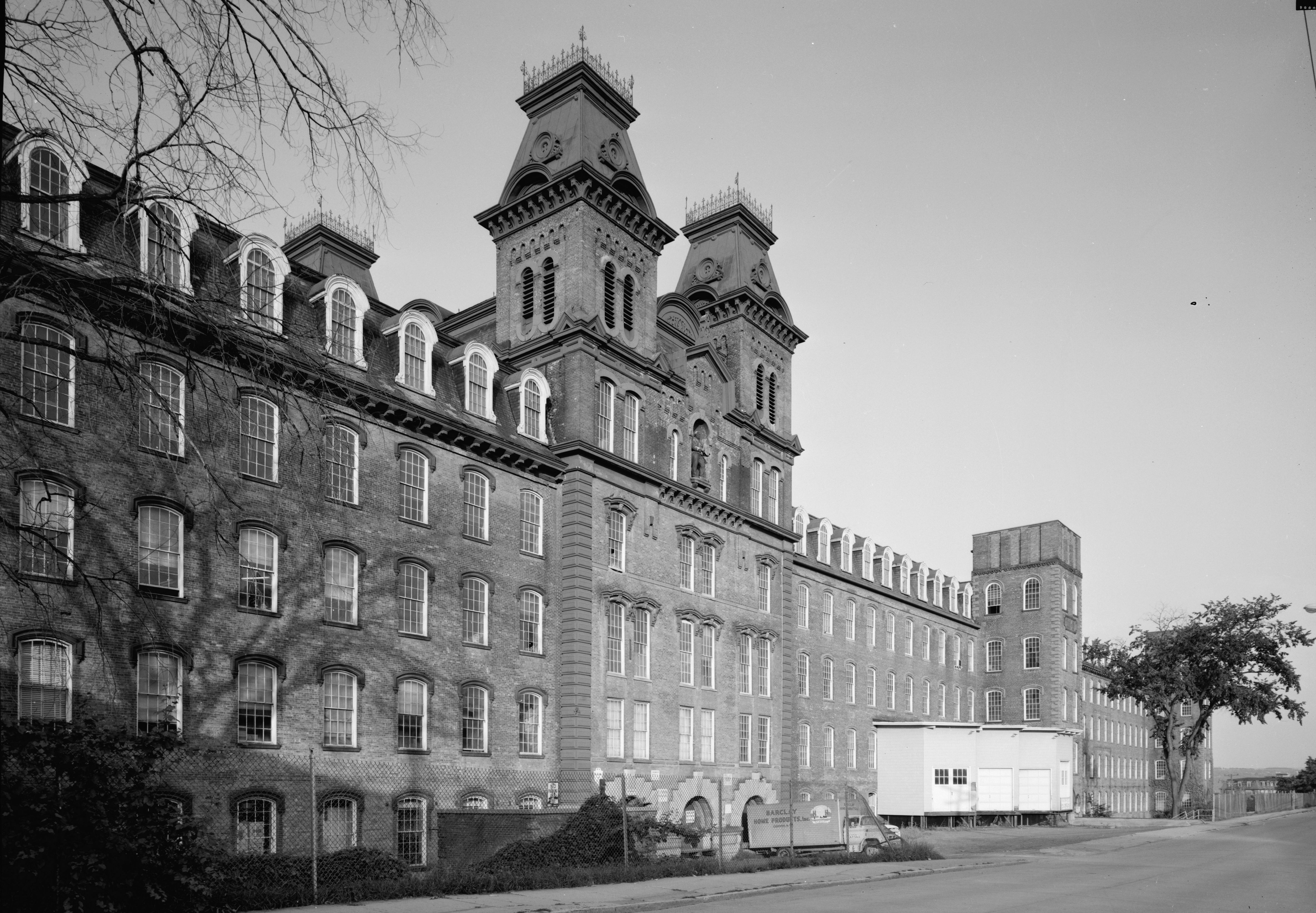
Harmony Mill No. 3, in 1969

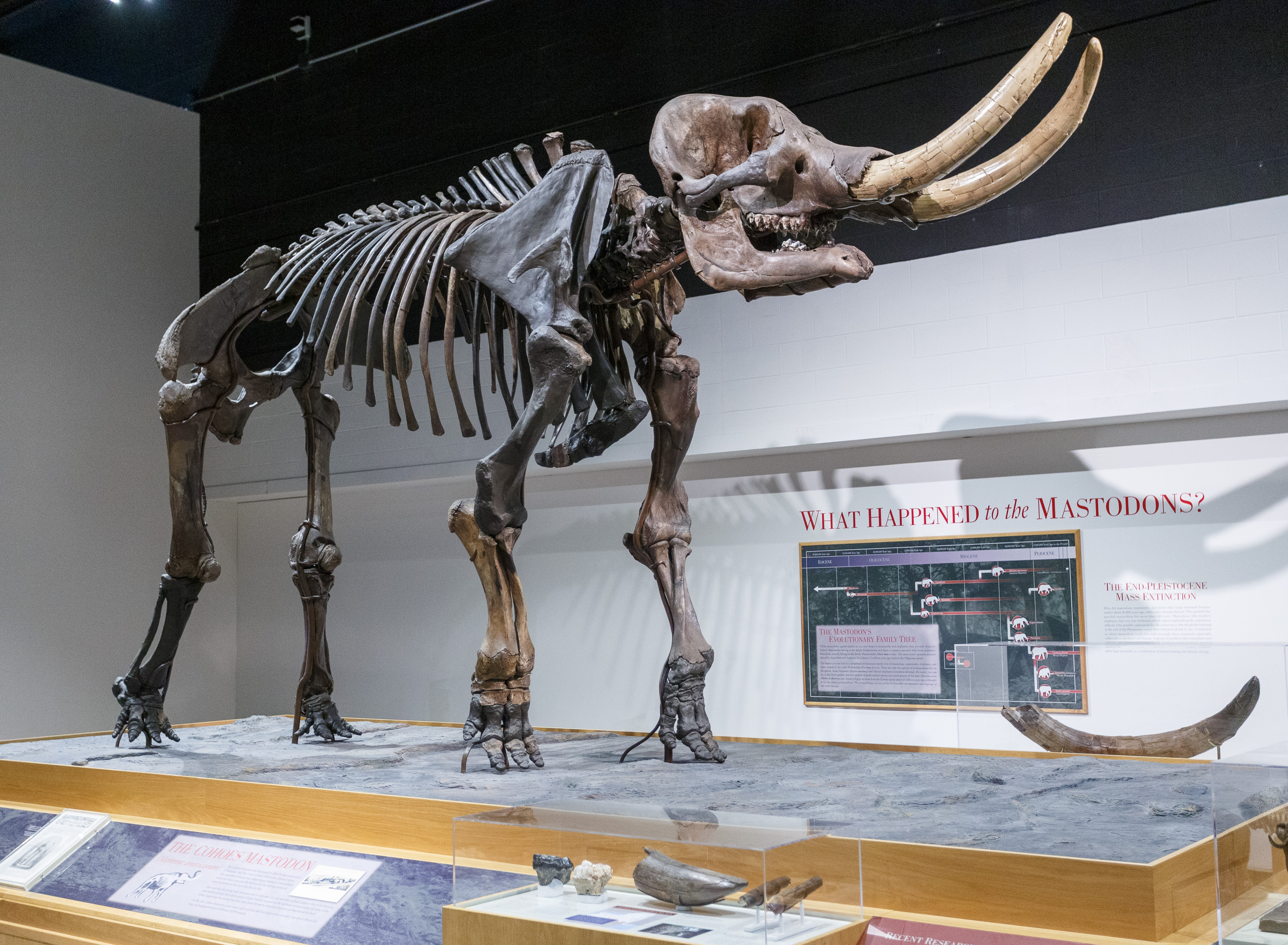
Cohoes Mastodon in the New York State Museum

In 1866, during excavation work for construction of Mill #3 of the Harmony Mills, the bones of a mastodon were unearthed over a period of several weeks. This mammal ranged in this territory when humans were first settling here.

The Cohoes Mastodon skeleton was long on display in the lobby of the New York State Museum in Albany, New York. Since the early 21st century, the skeleton has been moved to a new location away from the windows, where temperature and humidity fluctuations risked damaging the skeleton. A replica complete with fur is on display at the Cohoes Public Library.

Upon their completion, in 1872, the Harmony Mills were the largest cotton mill complex in the world. The Harmony Mills are an excellent example of 19th-century mill architecture. During the 19th century, numerous immigrants came to Cohoes to work in the mills, particularly French Canadians from Quebec and Irish, who first arrived as refugees in the 1840s from the Great Famine. The Harmony Mills Historic District was listed on the National Register of Historic Places in the late 20th century.

Around the start of the 20th century, daredevil Bobby Leach practiced going over the Cohoes Falls in a barrel before he performed the same stunt at Niagara. Cohoes residents watched this feat from the lawn or the porch of The Cataract House, the Victorian hotel at the corner of North Mohawk and School streets. This site was later developed as the present School Street Power Station.

=== 21st Century ===
Town buildings

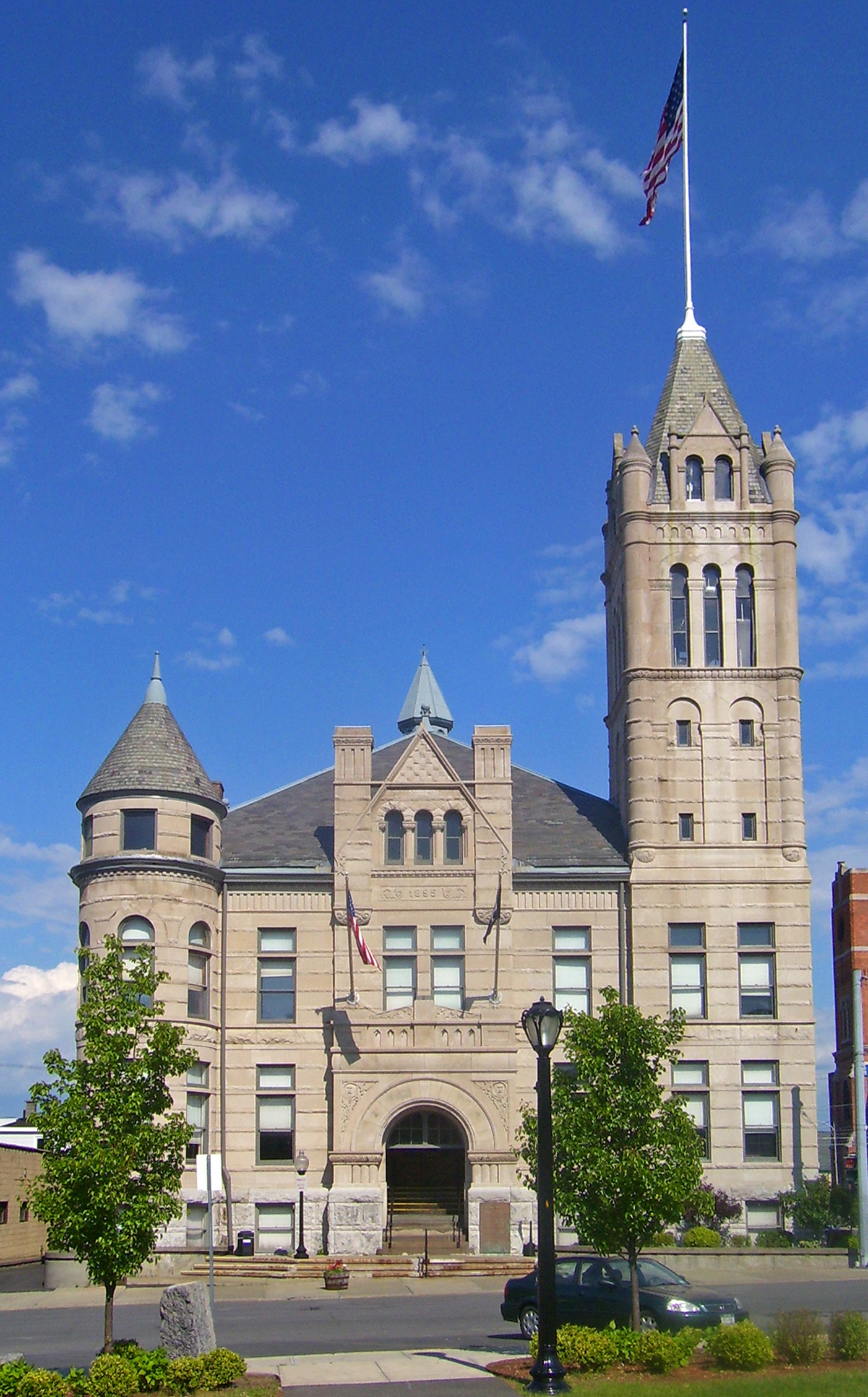
City Hall

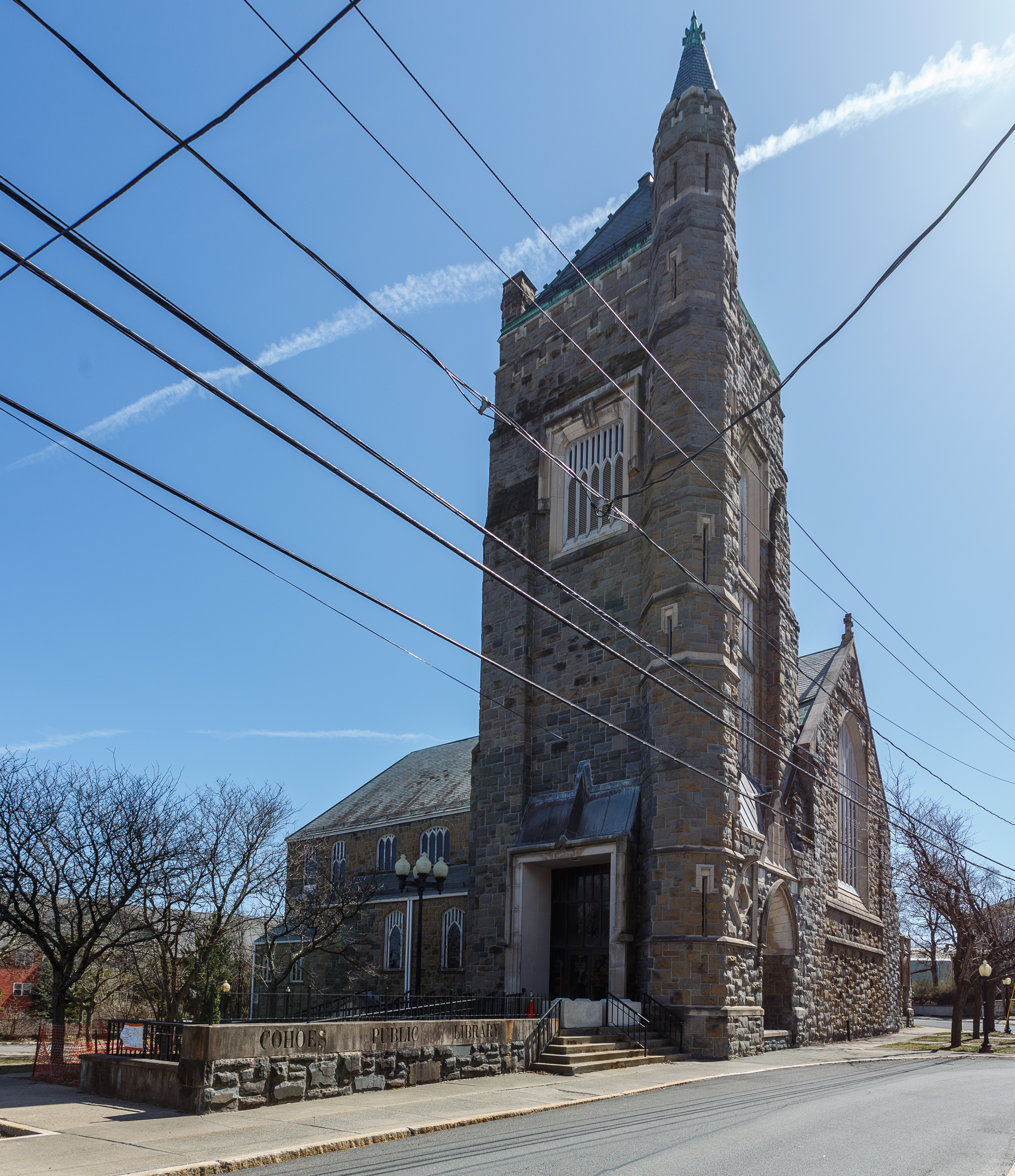
The Public Library is housed in a former church

From 2005 to 2013, the Harmony Mills were redeveloped and restored by real estate developer Uri Kaufman. Kaufman converted the Mills to luxury loft apartments, sparking a revival in the heart of the city.

On November 30, 2017, there was a massive fire that destroyed and damaged 21 buildings that caught the attention of national media. An amateur blacksmith, attempting to mimic the show Forged in Fire, started a barrel fire to forge with before losing control of it. High winds stoked the flames which spread over the course of six hours. At one point smoke and fire collectively consumed three blocks of the downtown district, and a plume of smoke rose over the city large enough to be detected by weather radar. Twenty-one buildings were heavily damaged or destroyed, with two businesses and a garage being completely leveled.

=== Improvements ===
Starting around 2020 to 2023, Cohoes embarked on a citywide revitalization project focused on improving infrastructure, restoring historic buildings, and environmental sustainability. The city invested $35 million in infrastructure improvements, including improving sidewalks, planting street trees, redesigning city parks, installing public charging stations for electric vehicles, and creating a new waterfront park.

In 2017, West End Park was redesigned to become a memorial park honoring veterans. In 2020, historic Canal Square Park in downtown Cohoes was redesigned to host Farmer’s Markets, outdoor concerts, and receptions and other events.

== Geography ==
Parks

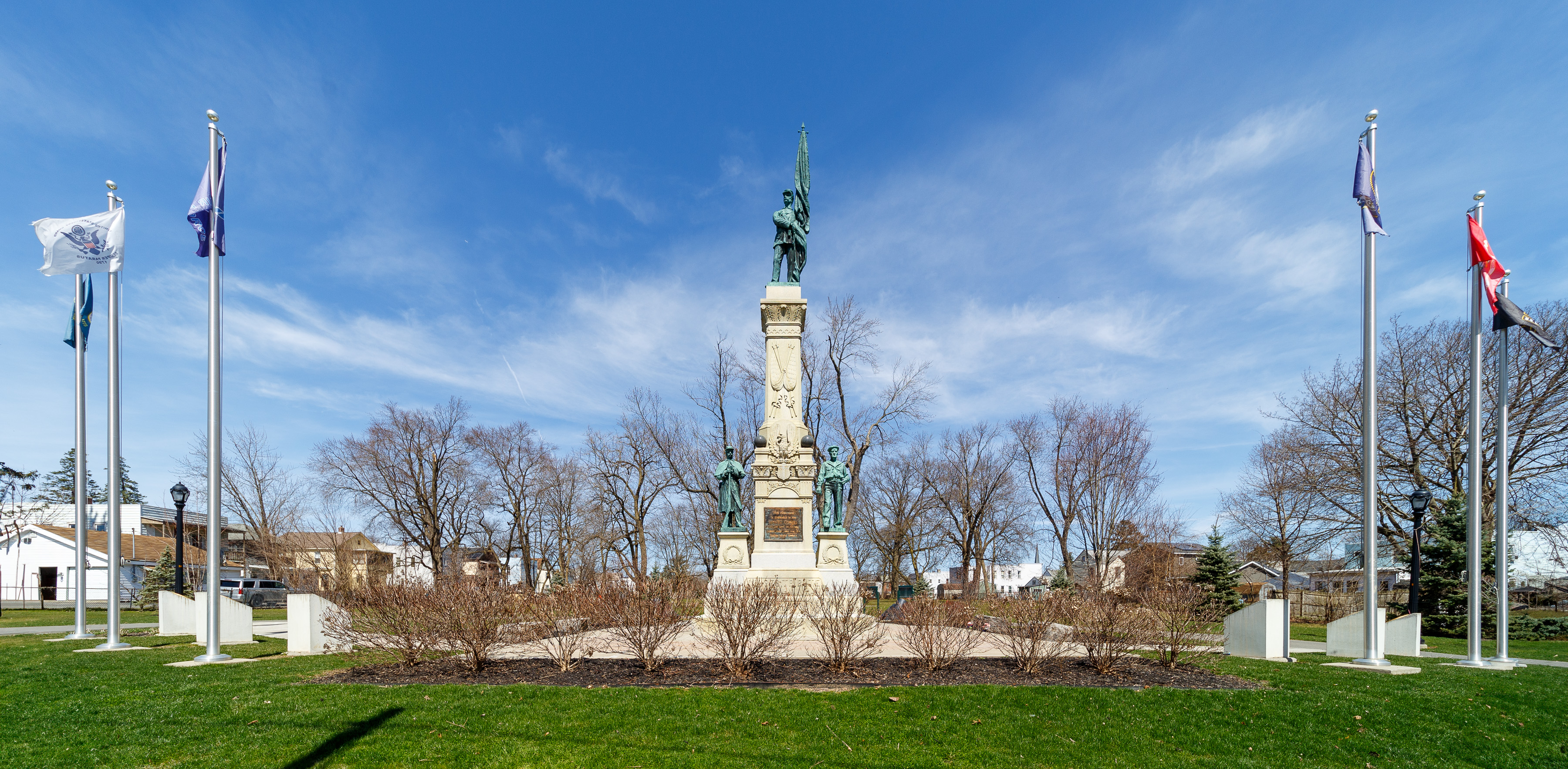
West End Park

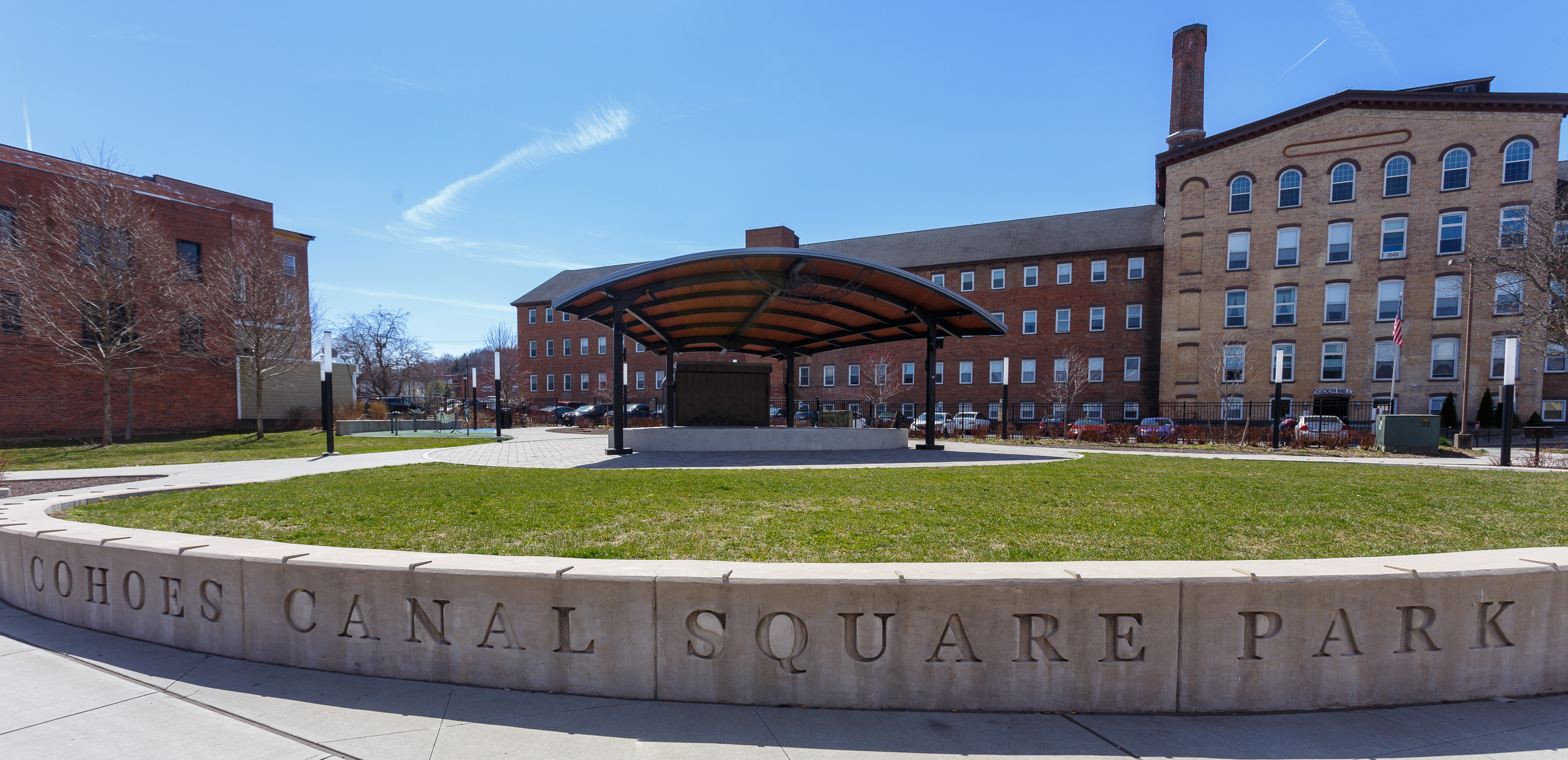
Canal Square

Town parks were redesigned in the early 21st Century as part of a town revitalization project.

According to the United States Census Bureau, the city has a total area of 4.2 square miles (11 km^{2}), of which 3.7 square miles (9.6 km^{2}) is land and 0.5 square miles (1.3 km^{2}) (11.79%) is water.

Cohoes is situated at the confluence of the Mohawk with the Hudson River, where the Mohawk forms several channels and islands. Cohoes is named for its most famous landmark, the Cohoes Falls, a majestic waterfall first seen by the area's successive generations of indigenous peoples. In the historic era, these were the Mohawk Nation. The city includes Van Schaick Island, where the historic Van Schaick Mansion is located, and Simmons Island.

Within Albany County, the city has the town of Colonie to its northwest, west, and south; with the town and village of Green Island to the south of Van Schaick Island. To the north across the Mohawk River is Saratoga County and the town of Waterford's hamlet of Northside. A bridge connects Cohoes to Waterford. To the east of Van Schaick Island across the Hudson River is Rensselaer County and the city of Troy's Lansingburg neighborhood. The 112th Street Bridge connects Van Schaick Island to Troy.

== Demographics ==
Historical population
Census	Pop.	Note	%±
1850	4,229		—
1860	8,800		108.1%
1870	15,357		74.5%
1880	19,416		26.4%
1890	22,509		15.9%
1900	23,910		6.2%
1910	24,709		3.3%
1920	22,987		−7.0%
1930	23,226		1.0%
1940	21,955		−5.5%
1950	21,272		−3.1%
1960	20,129		−5.4%
1970	18,653		−7.3%
1980	18,144		−2.7%
1990	16,825		−7.3%
2000	15,521		−7.8%
2010	16,168		4.2%
2020	18,147		12.2%
U.S. Decennial Census

=== 2020 census ===
As of the 2020 census, Cohoes had a population of 18,147. The median age was 40.1 years. 17.8% of residents were under the age of 18 and 18.0% of residents were 65 years of age or older. For every 100 females there were 87.8 males, and for every 100 females age 18 and over there were 85.4 males age 18 and over.

100.0% of residents lived in urban areas, while 0.0% lived in rural areas.

There were 8,739 households in Cohoes, of which 20.7% had children under the age of 18 living in them. Of all households, 27.5% were married-couple households, 24.0% were households with a male householder and no spouse or partner present, and 36.8% were households with a female householder and no spouse or partner present. About 42.2% of all households were made up of individuals and 13.1% had someone living alone who was 65 years of age or older.

There were 9,752 housing units, of which 10.4% were vacant. The homeowner vacancy rate was 1.9% and the rental vacancy rate was 7.5%.

Racial composition as of the 2020 census
Race	Number	Percent
White	14,327	78.9%
Black or African American	1,507	8.3%
American Indian and Alaska Native	51	0.3%
Asian	423	2.3%
Native Hawaiian and Other Pacific Islander	2	0.0%
Some other race	379	2.1%
Two or more races	1,458	8.0%
Hispanic or Latino (of any race)	1,093	6.0%

=== 2010 census ===
As of the 2010 census, there were 16,168 people (677 more than the 2000 census), 7,001 households, and 3,902 families residing in the city. The population density was 4,145.8 inhabitants per square mile (1,600.7/km^{2}). There were 7,689 housing units at an average density of 2,053.8 per square mile (793.0/km^{2}).

There were 6,932 households, out of which 25.9% had children under the age of 18 living with them, 36.4% were married couples living together, 15.3% had a female householder with no husband present, and 44.3% were non-families. 38.0% of all households were made up of individuals, and 15.6% had someone living alone who was 65 years of age or older. The average household size was 2.20 and the average family size was 2.91.

In the city, the population was spread out, with 22.4% under the age of 18, 8.5% from 18 to 24, 29.3% from 25 to 44, 22.5% from 45 to 64, and 17.3% who were 65 years of age or older. The median age was 38 years. For every 100 females, there were 86.1 males. For every 100 females age 18 and over, there were 81.6 males.

The median income for a household in the city was $32,856, and the median income for a family was $42,054. Males had a median income of $31,972 versus $25,845 for females. The per capita income for the city was $18,416. About 11.2% of families and 13.3% of the population were below the poverty line, including 22.9% of those under age 18 and 6.3% of those age 65 or over.

== Arts and culture ==
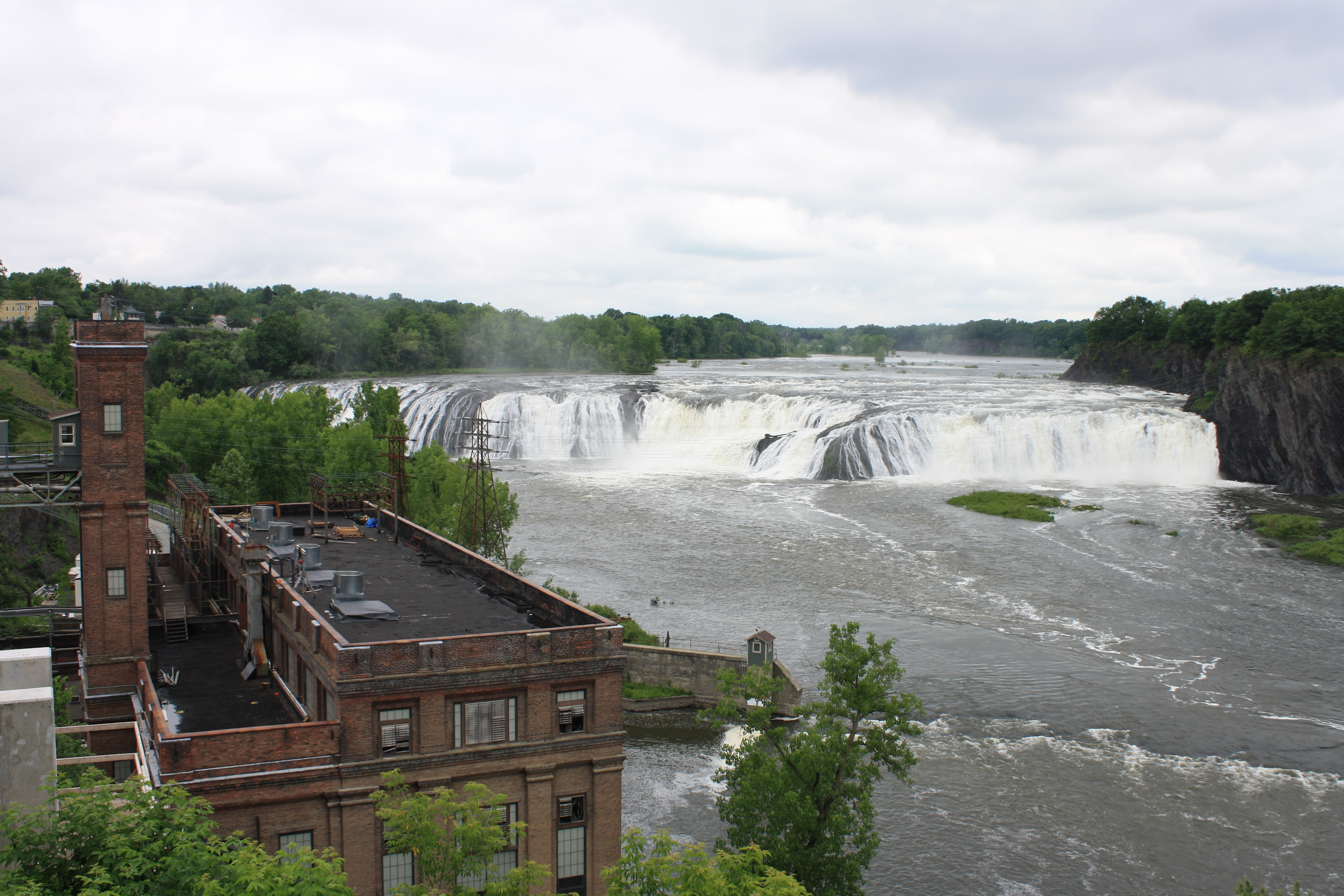
Cohoes Falls, from Overlook Park

=== Historic sites ===
A number of sites in Cohoes are included on the U.S. National Register of Historic Places, including -

- Cohoes Music Hall
- Delaware and Hudson Railroad Freight House
- William J. Dickey House
- Downtown Cohoes Historic District
- Enlarged Erie Canal Historic District (Discontiguous)
- Fonda House
- Godfrey Farmhouse
- Harmony Mill No. 3
- Harmony Mills Historic District
- J. Leonard Lackman House
- Lock 18 of Enlarged Erie Canal
- Matton Shipyard
- Olmstead Street Historic District
- Silliman Memorial Presbyterian Church
- Van Schaick House

== Infrastructure ==
=== Transportation ===
New York State Route 787 has its northern terminus in Cohoes. New York State Route 32 runs north–south through Cohoes. New York State Route 470 crosses east–west through the city and goes over the Hudson River to the northern parts of Troy.

Until the mid-1950s, the Delaware and Hudson Railroad ran the Laurentian train (New York - Montreal), making a stop at its station in Cohoes. Until the early 1960s, the D&H ran trains from Albany to Saratoga Springs that made stops in Cohoes.

== Notable people ==
- Charles H. Adams, U.S. representative for New York
- Chester A. Arthur, president of the United States
- Ben Beaury, soccer player
- Ronald Canestrari, mayor of Cohoes and New York state politician
- George Davis, Major League Baseball (MLB) player and coach and inductee to the National Baseball Hall of Fame
- James Lafferty, Wisconsin state politician
- Zach Remillard, MLB player
- Harold E. Rosecrans, brigadier general in the Marines Corps

== In popular culture ==
Author Kurt Vonnegut's character, writer Kilgore Trout, was said to have been a resident of Cohoes in his story, "Requiem for a Dreamer".
