= Downtown Cohoes Historic District =

Historic district in New York, United States

- U.S. National Register of Historic Places
- U.S. Historic district
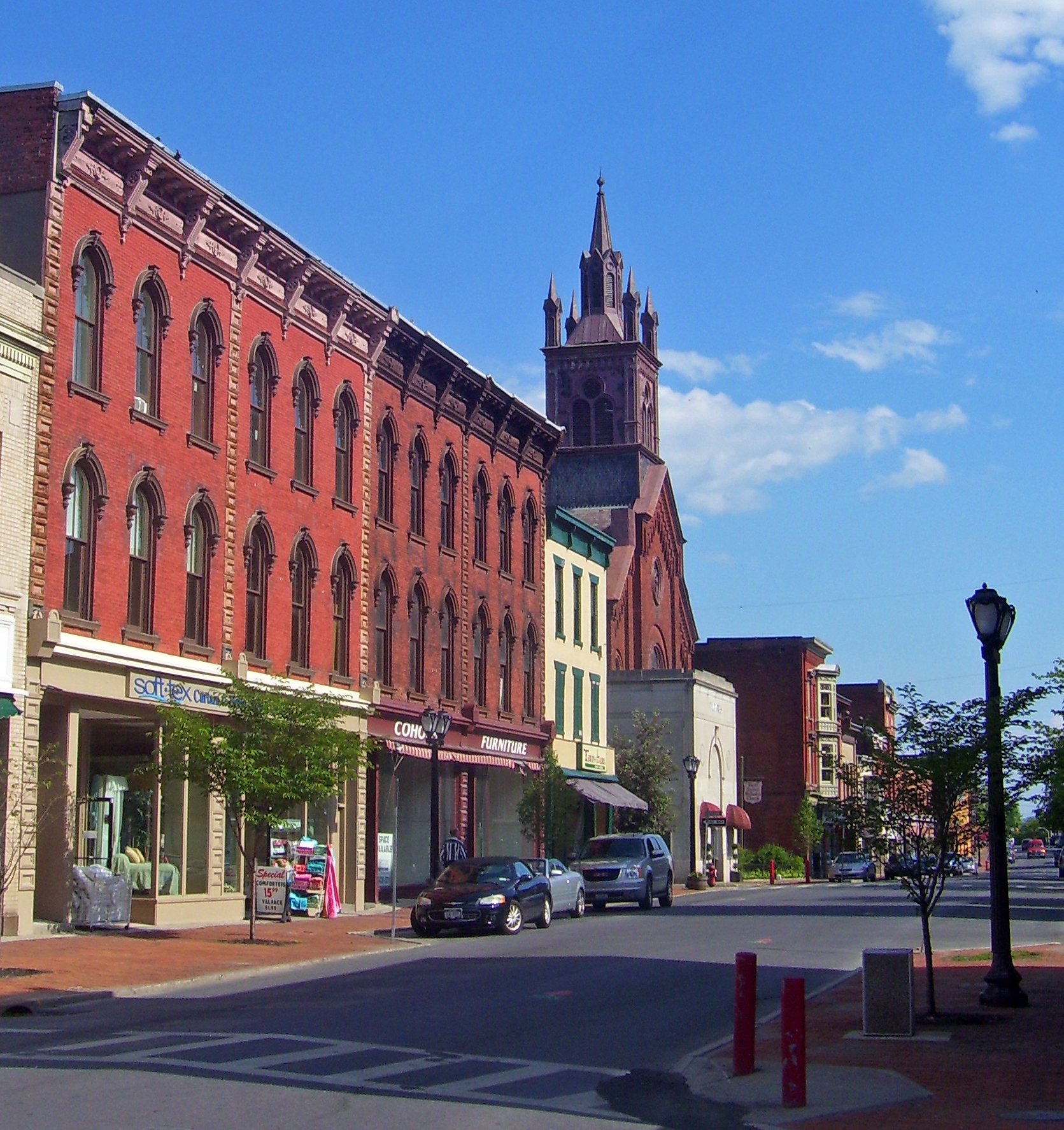
- View south down Remsen Street from Ontario Street, 2008

- Location within New York Location within the United States

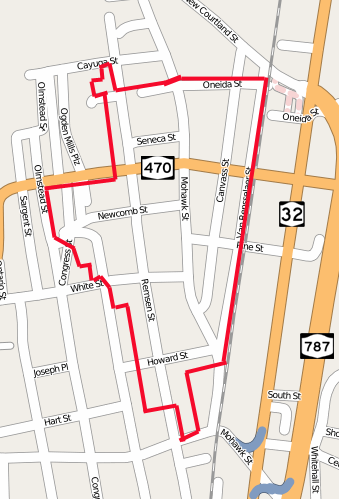
- Map of district
- Interactive map showing Downtown Cohoes Historic District
- Location: Cohoes, NY
- Coordinates: 42°46′27″N 73°42′04″W
- Area: 35 acres (14 ha)
- Built: 1820-1930
- Architect: multiple
- Architectural style: Italianate, Greek Revival, Second Empire
- NRHP reference No.: 84002060
- Added to NRHP: 1984

The Downtown Cohoes Historic District takes up 35 acres (14 ha) of the city of Cohoes, New York, United States. Many of the 165 contributing properties date from the 1820-1930 period when the Erie Canal and Harmony Mills were the mainstay of the city's economy. It was recognized as a historic district and added to the National Register of Historic Places in 1984. After years of neglect and decline, it has recently started to see an upswing in business activity due to its historic character and the city's efforts to protect it.

It is a roughly triangular area encompassing most of the city's business district, along the axes of Ontario and Remsen streets. Most of its buildings are contributing properties, with only a few late 20th-century intrusions; most of those are residential or commercial and in-use but they also include several churches, factories, a train station and the city hall. They range in architectural styles from Federal to Art Moderne.

One building within the district, Cohoes Music Hall, was listed on the National Register before the creation of the district. Another National Register listing, the Silliman Memorial Presbyterian Church, was demolished in 1998. A similar fate befell a church building designed by Richard Upjohn after it burned in 1894, but its rectory survives.

== Geography ==
The district is bounded by Oneida Street on the north and the former Delaware and Hudson Railroad (now CP Rail) tracks on the east. On the west it takes the form of an irregular diagonal beginning at the intersection of Columbia and Remsen streets at the southeast, cutting through the middle of several blocks, and ending at Ontario and Olmstead streets in the northeast.

Directly adjacent to this northeastern corner is the separately-designated Olmstead Street Historic District, which includes the Ogden Mill and row houses built for textile workers, a short distance to the northeast. To the north and east flow the Mohawk and Hudson rivers, respectively.

Most of the land in the district is developed in the form of commercial and industrial buildings, with a few churches and Cohoes's city hall. There are some vacant lots on the edges, most notably the former canal bed at the northeast corner. The land is relatively level, reflecting the nearby river confluence.

The main route through the district is NY 470, which follows Ontario Street. It leads east to Troy across the river via the 112th Street Bridge and west to Colonie. The north-south routes 32 and 787 are located along the Hudson, just to the immediate east of the district.

== History ==
From its settlement in the 17th century through the years after independence, Cohoes was a quiet farming community inhabited by a few families of Dutch descent. When outsiders came to Cohoes, it was to see the Cohoes Falls along the Mohawk, the source of the town's name.

The construction of the canal from 1817 to 1832 changed that. There were less than 25 buildings in the current district before 1831, but industrialization had already begun with some mills along the Mohawk. One, the Cohoes Company, began building the smaller local canal system that would provide power to many of the early businesses.

By 1837 the canal had been so successful that the company spent five years acquiring land for and then building the newer Enlarged Erie Canal, to handle larger shipping. The route, and several locks, can still be seen and followed from the northeast corner of the district to Lock 18 near the western city limit. Main Street today follows the original canal bed. In the northern part of the city, former land of the original Erie Canal was reacquired in 1846 by the Cohoes Company for its local power canal system.

The canal's success led to the population of the town doubling in the 1840s, and a corresponding building boom. As a result, the town incorporated as a village, electing its first board in 1848. At this time most of today's streets were mapped and laid out. The district was the only developed area of town; it was surrounded by farmland. The railroad was built, further extending the reach of local industry and creating more jobs.

In the second half of the century, particularly once the Civil War had ended, the textile industry's growth in the town fueled another boom. The first mill, the Troy Manufacturing Co., was opened on Ontario Street in 1843. It was thought to be the first in the country devoted to manufacturing hosiery and knit products. It failed within a decade, but a new owner took over and Cohoes went from three mills in 1852 to 27 by 1886, employing 4,000 people. The thousand-foot (300 m) Harmony Mills complex was the world's largest cotton processing facility when it opened in 1872, and later came to be identified with the town.

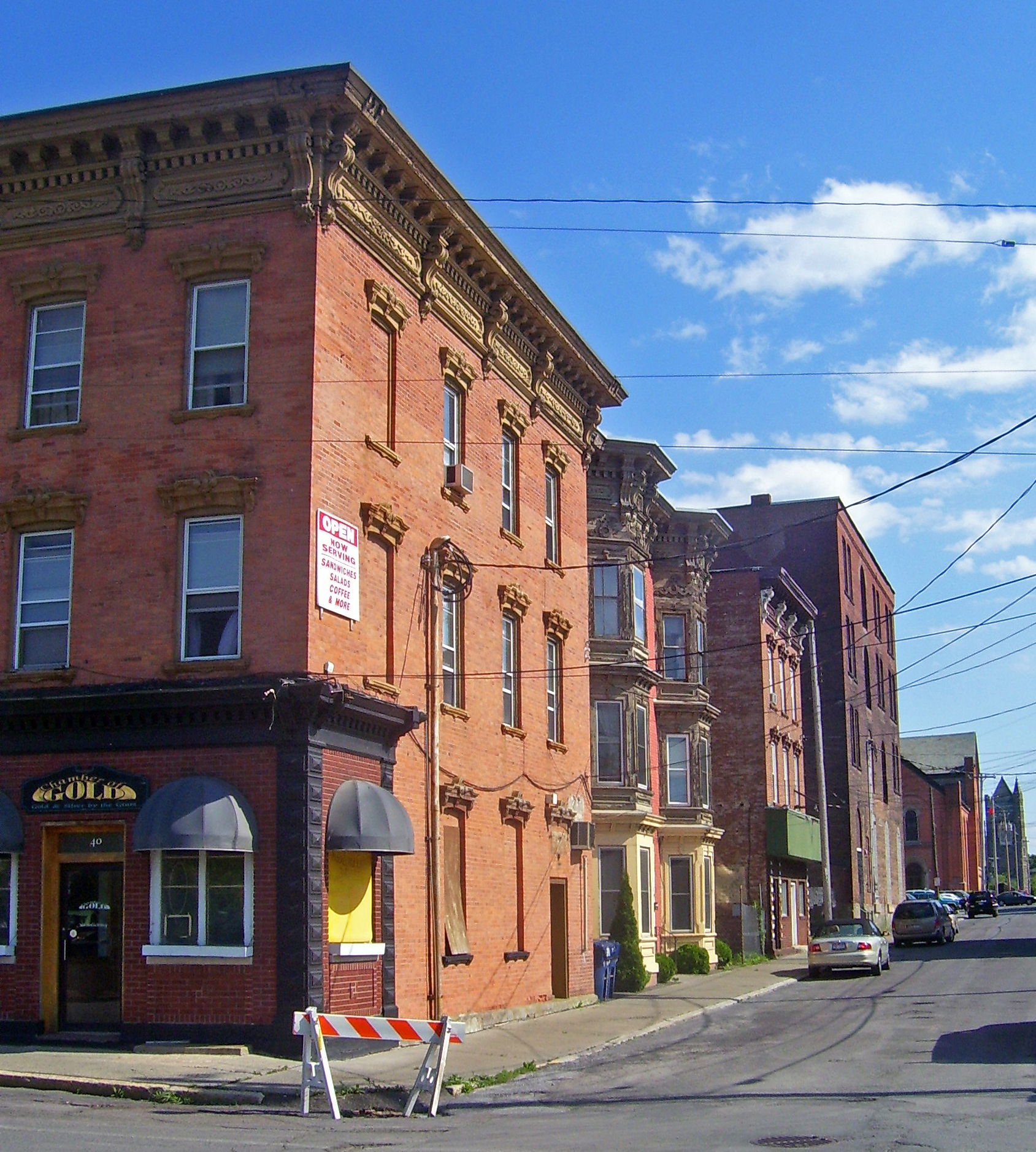
Housing along Canvass Street, built during the late 19th century

The earlier growth expanded, and by 1870 11,100 had settled in the village. That year it reincorporated as a city. The new construction, and reconstruction and expansion of existing properties, brought new homes and churches to the downtown area. One of the latter, St. John's Episcopal Church, was designed by Richard Upjohn, the architect of many of America's notable churches from that era, and built in 1870. It was destroyed by fire a quarter-century later, and replaced by a newer building but its rectory remains in use. The Music Hall, the district's best Second Empire-style building, was opened in 1874.

Kansas state architect J.C. Holland designed the Romanesque/Chateauesque City Hall in 1896. It was complemented by the Romanesque Silliman Memorial Presbyterian Church (since demolished), named by local benefactor Horace Silliman for his parents and opened the same year just across the street.

Downtown was mostly built out by the start of the 20th century, but there are still some notable bank buildings from that period in the contemporary Classical Revival style. Construction slowed after World War I, reflecting the decline of the industries that had fueled the city's growth in the previous century. The Mechanics' Bank and Cohoes Theatre, the latter designed and built in the 1930s (although not opened until 1941), are the only buildings downtown in the Moderne style.

The onset of the Great Depression in the 1930s halted all construction and put an end to Cohoes' days as an industrial center. At the same time, it meant that no alterations would take place to existing buildings, leaving them intact (if often vacant and neglected) for when the district was added to the Register 50 years later. A planned revitalization in the 1970s and '80s to create an urban mall similar to those in Amsterdam and Batavia, which would have meant demolishing or altering many of the older buildings, was never fully implemented.

== Significant contributing properties ==
All but ten of the 175 properties within the district are considered sufficiently historic to be contributing to its overall character. They include residences, commercial buildings (including some factories) churches, the city hall, post office and former train station.

=== Residential ===
- 2-4 White Street, an 1820s Federal style frame house, is one of the few pre-industrial buildings in the district and among the oldest houses in Cohoes.
- Van Auken House, 115 Mohawk Street. This was the home of textile executive David Van Auken, a brick Second Empire home with exceptional Eastlake detail, a touch rare in Cohoes, built in 1873.
- St. John's Episcopal Church Rectory, 169 Mohawk Street. A brick and stone hipped-roofed building designed in 1870 by Richard Upjohn's firm in the Victorian Gothic style, it survives the parent church, destroyed in an 1894 fire.

=== Commercial/Industrial ===
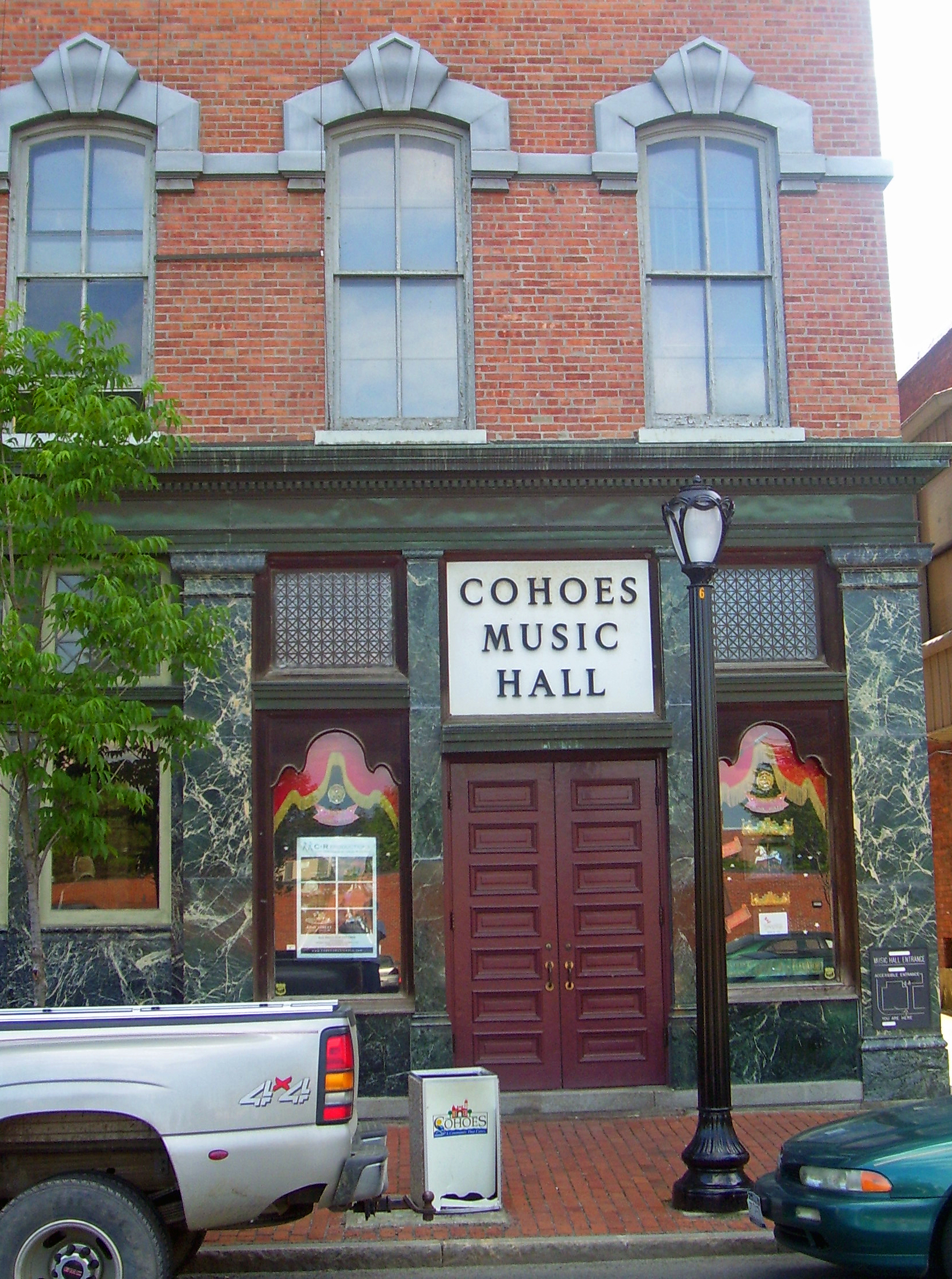
Music Hall main entrance

- 205 Remsen Street. Three-story, six-bay building with dentil molding erected in the 1840s during canal boom is the largest Federal-style building remaining in the district.
- Carter Block, 57-63 Remsen Street. 1850 building with square pilasters, frieze, modillioned cornice and parapet railing is the best Greek Revival building in district.
- Cohoes Savings Bank, 75 Remsen Street. Well-developed Beaux-Arts bank building built in 1904 and expanded 19 years later.
- Cohoes Music Hall, 58 Remsen Street. The one outstanding Second Empire building in the district, dating to 1874 and listed on the National Register in its own right in 1971. Four-story brick building with mansard roof, hood moldings, stone courses and marble storefront is one of the most ornate and best-preserved commercial facades in the district.
- Cohoes Theatre, White and Remsen streets. Only major building in district in [[Streamline Moderne|Art Moderne]] style, with typical overhanging multiple hipped roof.
- Delaware and Hudson Railroad Station, 127 Canvass Street. Well-preserved 1883 Queen Anne building
- Troy Manufacturing Mill, 302 Ontario Street. Four-story gabled mill was the first textile mill in the city when built in 1843 and possibly the first mill in the country that manufactured hosiery and knit products.

=== Institutional ===
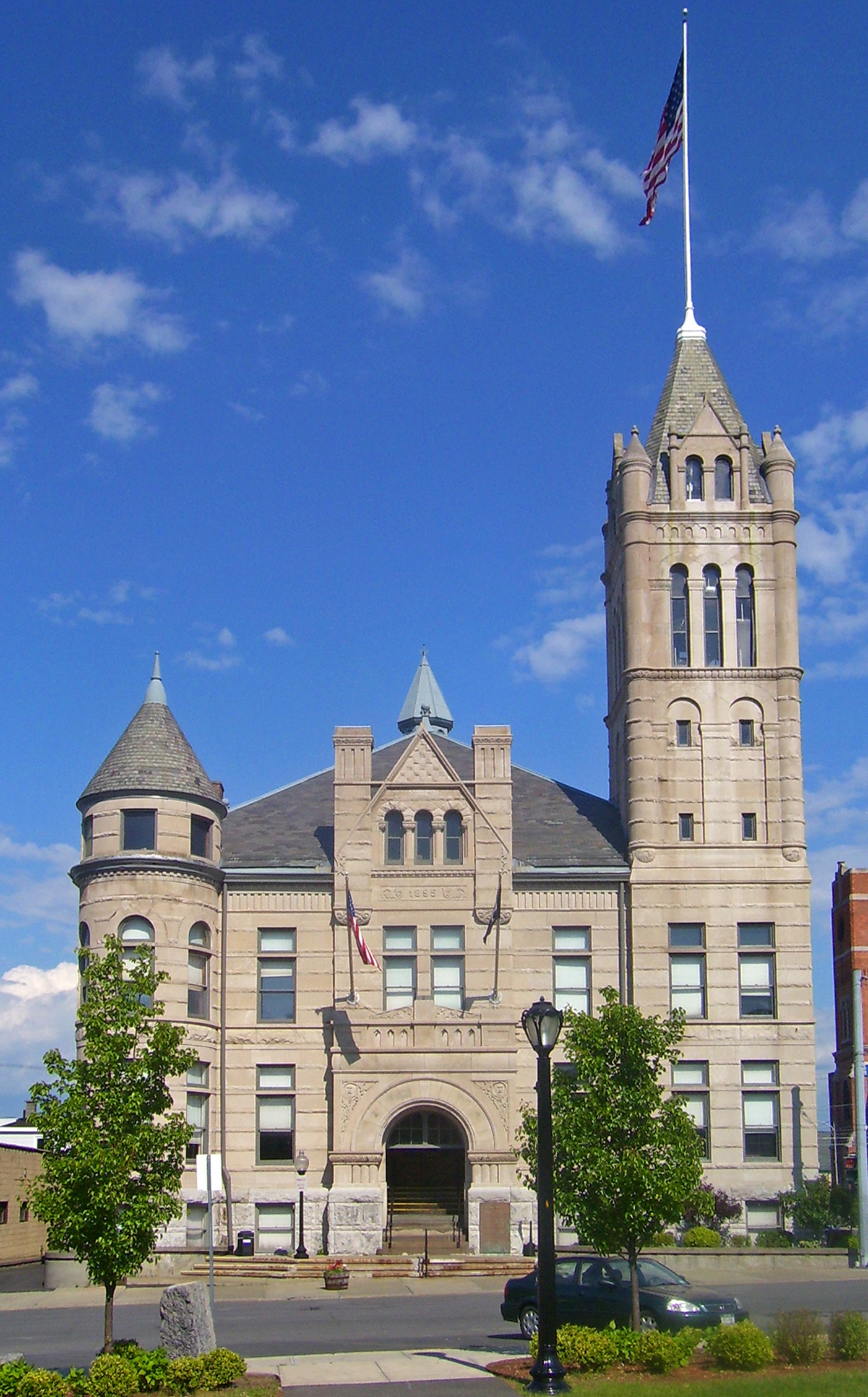
City Hall

- City Hall, Ontario and Mohawk streets.Romanesque/Chateauesque building designed by J.C. Holland in 1895 has long been a city landmark. Features grey limestone in smooth-coursed ashlar alternating with bands of more rougher facing, conical-roofed round towers and ornamental crests and finials.
- St. Bernard's Roman Catholic Church, 107 Ontario Street. Large brick Romanesque church, built in the 1860s, has an enclosed garden. Originally had a 200-foot (61 m) spire that collapsed during an 1875 storm.
- St. John's Episcopal Church, now the Cohoes Public Library, 169 Mohawk Street. Incorporates remaining manse from destroyed Richard Upjohn design.

=== Demolished ===
- Silliman Memorial Presbyterian Church, Ontario and Mohawk streets. Facing city hall and built the same year, this Romanesque Revival sandstone structure was an excellent example of the style. It was listed on the National Register in 1971 but was demolished in 1998.

== Preservation and renewal ==
The historic buildings have been attractive to some redevelopers as the city continues efforts to recover from the decline of its major industries and redefine itself as a bedroom community for Albany. "The revitalization of Remsen Street is the keystone to the City's future success", said a 2002 city plan for improving and revitalizing downtown. It recommended a $3.1 million plan to improve the streets and lighting in the district, with an emphasis on preserving or restoring its historic character.

The city has made some grants available for facade restoration and improvements to the rental properties above the storefronts with the goal of promoting a mix of uses among office, residential and retail. The Capital District Transportation Committee did a study that used the downtown historic district in its "Linkage" program as one of three "corridors" in Cohoes in which it recommended changes that could be made to stimulate redevelopment.

Within three years during the 2000s the value of construction projects with city issued building permits increased almost fivefold. Many of the businesses that have located in the city have been niche and specialty retailers. By 2006, there was over a million dollars in private investment downtown. A Rite Aid was built on the lot at the west edge of the district known as Bush's Block, on the site of the former Victor Carrybag building. In 2007 the city began hosting a farmers' market on Remsen Street during growing season.

To ensure that new construction preserves the character of the historic district, the city has enacted a "historic overlay district" within its zoning code which includes all the city's historic areas. The code requires that any new construction or redevelopment affecting an exterior or interior space visible from outside be approved by the city's Historic Preservation and Architectural Review Board, to ensure that contributing properties '"historic features [will be] altered as little as possible."
