= Silliman Memorial Presbyterian Church =

Historic church in New York, United States

- U.S. National Register of Historic Places
- Location within New York Location within the United States
- Location: Mohawk and Seneca Sts., Cohoes, New York
- Coordinates: 42°46′28″N 73°42′2″W
- Area: 1.4 acres (0.57 ha)
- Built: 1897
- Architect: Fuller & Wheeler
- Architectural style: Romanesque, Richardsonian Romanesque
- NRHP reference No.: 79001565
- Added to NRHP: August 1, 1979

Silliman Memorial Presbyterian Church was a historic Presbyterian church located at Cohoes in Albany County, New York. The complex was built in 1896–1897 and consisted of a church, a church house, and a manse. The Romanesque style church was a square structure constructed of brownstone and brick with an engaged tower at each corner. It featured various gables and turrets on the roof covered in slate. The church house was a 2 1/2-story, Richardsonian Romanesque–style building. The manse was a 2-story stone residence with a Tudor arch doorway. The complex was demolished in 1998.

It was listed on the National Register of Historic Places in 1979, and it remains listed on the National Register despite no longer being in existence.
