= AIY =

AIY or aiy may refer to:

- Bader Field, a defunct airport in Atlantic City, New Jersey, U.S., from 1919 to 2006, by former IATA code
- Aiy, the benevolent spirits in the mythology of the Yakut people of the Republic of Sakha (Yakutia), Russia
- Ali language, a language spoken in the Central African Republic, by ISO 639 code
- Adana İdman Yurdu, a women's association football team based in Adana, Turkey, from 1993 to 2022
- Apollo Investment Corporation, an American company, by stock ticker; see Companies listed on the New York Stock Exchange (A)
- Aircrew Check and Training Australia, an Australian airline, by ICAO code; see List of airline codes (A)

== See also ==
- Google AIY Projects, an app in the List of Android apps by Google
- AI (disambiguation)
- Ay (disambiguation)
- AIYF (disambiguation)
