= Albany Felt Company Complex =

Former industrial site on north edge of New York state capital city

- U.S. National Register of Historic Places
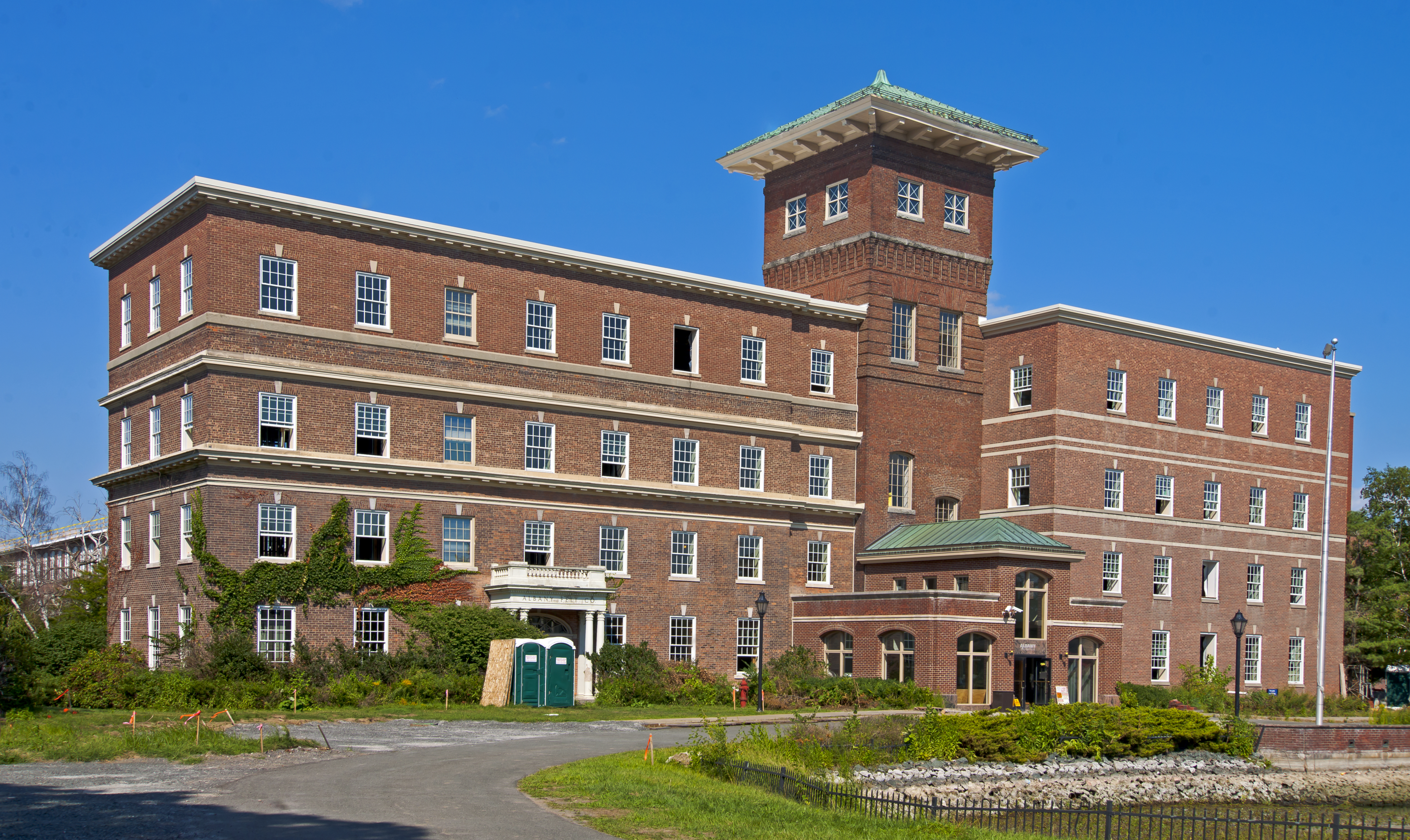
- Main building, south elevation, 2015

- Location within New York Location within the United States
- Location: Menands and Albany, New York
- Coordinates: 42°40′38″N 73°44′0″W
- Area: 14.45 acres (5.85 ha)
- Built: 1902, 1910, 1920s, 1938, 1941, 1954.
- Architect: Lockwood, Greene and Company
- Architectural style: Neoclassical, Colonial Revival
- NRHP reference No.: 14000001
- Added to NRHP: February 14, 2014

The former Albany Felt Company Complex, now The Lofts at One Broadway, is located along Broadway (partly New York State Route 32) in eastern Albany County, New York, United States. It is mostly within the village of Menands, with a small portion at its southern end within the city of Albany. In 2014 it was listed on the National Register of Historic Places.

In 1902 the Albany Felt Company built the first of several buildings on the site to manufacture industrial felt for the region's paper industry. Soon that building became its corporate headquarters; it expanded regularly over the first half of the 20th century to the complex's present size. Two ponds on the property were originally created as reservoirs for fire suppression, since the factory was at the time it was built a considerable distance from the nearest firehouse.

Over the later half of the 20th century, the company continued to prosper and expanded both its geographical reach and its product line, changing its name to Albany International in the process. By the early 21st century, its product line had largely evolved from felts to composites. In the 2010s, shortly before the property was listed on the Register, it moved its headquarters to New Hampshire and sold the Albany buildings. Part has been used by a self-storage business; the main office building is currently being remodeled into apartments.

== Buildings and grounds ==
The factory complex is located on a 14.45-acre (5.85 ha) lot primarily in Menands, with its southern portion in Albany's North Albany neighborhood. It is the northernmost property listed on the National Register in the city of Albvany, as a result. The area is primarily urban, transitioning from densely developed mixed commercial and residential use in a loose grid pattern of streets on the west to larger industrial facilities with undeveloped buffer to the east. The terrain rises to the west but is level on the east, reflecting the presence of the Hudson River a half-mile (800 m) in that direction.

The lot is rectangular, with the long axis running generally north–south parallel to Broadway on its west, which at the Wolfert Avenue intersection midway alongside becomes part of New York State Route 32. On the north are two vacant lots. East of the factory, past a small wooded buffer area, is a rail line paralleled by Canal Road, the former route of the Erie Canal. Albany County's sewage treatment plant is on the other side. To the south of the complex is another, smaller industrial complex.

An original decorative cast iron fence with brick poles runs along all the property lines save the east, which uses a modern chainlink fence. It is accompanied by regularly spaced mature trees along the Broadway side. There are entrances from Broadway near the north and south ends of the property. The latter has a small gatehouse.

Within the fence are three buildings. The large main building, with several wings, runs from the north to south along the length of the property. To its east, in the southeast of the property, are two smaller warehouses, the northern one larger than the other.

South of the main building, within Albany rather than Menands, is a small pond about the width of that end of the building. It is landscaped and surrounded with several concrete paths; a driveway curves around it from the parking lot to the main entrance and back. To its south is an unpaved parking lot. Roadways leading east from it circle the east side of the property, passing the warehouses and leading to other parking lots and eventually the lot near the entrance at the north end. Another pond, mostly rectangular in shape with an additional fence around it, is located in the southern portion of the space on the main building's west amidst the lawns around it.

=== Main building ===
The main building extends 602 feet (183 m) to the north from the south wing. Its main block was built at different times of three separate similarly sized sections; they appear as one single section today. The earliest is the largest, just north of the southern section and perpendicular to it. It is a three-story structure of load-bearing brick walls, 2 feet (61 cm) thick at the base and narrowing to 16 inches (41 cm) at the third story, with a flat roof covered in polyvinyl chloride, 85 feet (26 m) wide at the south end and 170 feet (52 m) at the north. In addition to the southern wing, there is a small L-shaped addition on the east side just north of it.

On both east and west side, its fenestration consists of regularly spaced gently arched windows in every bay. All are 6–8 feet (1.8–2.4 m) wide, separated by only half that distance, with a central mullion separating nine panes on either side; the windows on the east elevation of the eastern face of the extension on the north side are even larger. Some have hopper windows in their bottom panes. The window arches are topped by splayed bricks; at the roofline is a wooden eave supported by brackets. Along the ground level regularly planted shrubs and decorative trees screen many of the windows. The western elevation has two four-bay, one-story additions on the first floor.

The southern wing is centered on a five-story stair tower, 22 feet (6.7 m) square. An entrance pavilion of later construction projects south from the two bottom stories of the south elevation, the only one not connected to another wing. Above it, at the third story, are two offset windows similar in shape and surround to those on the main block but set with 20-pane casement. At a point on the tower equal to about midway along the windows every fifth course of bricks is recessed. The fourth story windows, now on all faces, begin with a rusticated stone sill at the third recessed course; the 20-pane rectangular casement rises past the next five recessed courses to a large splayed brick lintel that itself rises through two more recessed courses.

At the top of the windows' splayed brick, a series of brick corbels rise to a rusticated stone course that sets off the fifth story. Above them on each face are two square windows with mullions forming an "X". They, two, have rusticated stone sills and lintels of splayed brick, albeit more restrained than that on the fourth story. Above them in turn is a brick cornice and frieze. The peaked roof has bracketed eaves wider than those on the main block; it is sheathed in metallic tile topped with a blunt finial.

The entrance pavilion has three bays. A central section with a metallic hipped roof rises from the otherwise flat roof. All its facades are brick laid in stretcher bond.

Entrance is provided by modern glass and steel doors located in the center of the first floor's south elevation. Above it is a marble entablature with "Albany International" engraved on it. The same brown marble serves as a water table around the base of the pavilion.

Windows are the same shape and size as those on the main block but with just four panes; a cast stone stringcourse separates the two stories. Two large security cameras are mounted on it just west of the entrance. A similar window rises from the entablature above the front entrance; on the sides of the second story section are single-pane casement. The roof is surrounded otherwise by a parapet with stone coping.

The south wing itself consists of two slightly offset wings. On the west is the larger one, extending eight bays from the stair tower toward Broadway and topped with a flat roof. Some portions are overgrown with ivy. In the fifth bay west from the tower is an older wooden main entrance portico.

On either side of a low stone porch, two smooth columns with Corinthian capitals are topped by a molded cornice below a frieze with "Albany Felt Co." in the entablature. Above it is a dentilled cornice, overhanging eave and balustraded balcony. The entrance is a pair of doors flanked by sidelights and topped with a fanlight.

All other bays on the first floor are set with 12-over-12 double-hung sash windows with stone sills and splayed brick lintels with keystones. The second story has eight-over-eight double-hung sash in every bay. Above it is a cast stone stringcourse, frieze and modillioned stone cornice which serves as the sill line for the third story.

Windows on the third story have the same treatment as those below. A plain stone cornice divides them from the similarly treated fourth-story windows, which rise from a plain stone course, the coping that once topped the parapet before the story was built.

The three-bay west elevation continues the same window treatments seen on the south. On the north, a framed bay window is along the first floor opposite the entrance portico. The four bays to its west have two larger windows flanking two smaller ones. Window spacing on the two floors above is similarly irregular; the bay east of center on the second story has a window with sidelights.

On the east, the wing is five bays wide. It also projects a bay out from the tower. Treatments on this wing are identical to those on the west, with the exception of the stone courses on the upper stories, all of which are plain and flush with the facade.

External image
- Photo of east wing, south facade

The southeast addition is also three stories high, although not to the height of the main block. It similarly has a flat roof. The main entrance is in the third bay from the east on the six-bay southern facade. It is a modern steel and glass door sheltered by a front-gabled metal roof supported by two square brick pillars.

Fenestration on the first story otherwise consists of 18-pane rectangular casement in the bays on the first floor east of the entrance, and double versions of those windows with the lower 12 panes opening hopper style on the west. The second story has 12-over-12 double-hung sash with four-pane transoms; above it the third story has 8-over-12 double-hung sash with four-pane transoms. At the roofline is another eave with brackets.

==== Interior ====
The south wing contains former offices, now being converted into apartments, on both sides of both wings with a central hallway, on all floors. The sections to the north have open interiors with 15-foot (4.6 m) ceilings. They are floored with 4–6-inch-thick (10–15 cm) tongue and groove thin strip wooden planks. From them three rows of wooden pillars (two rows in the northeast section), divide the section into four internal bays, connecting to exposed wooden joists on the ceiling.

=== Warehouses ===
External images
- Older warehouse
- Newer warehouse

There are two warehouses on the east side of the building, near the southeast corner of the main building. The more southerly, and older, is a one-story brick rectangular front-gabled structure with a full-length brick addition on the side, just southeast of the main building's east wing. The main entrance on the north side is an overhead garage door with a normal one next to it. To their east are three oversized glass block windows. A former window in the gable peak has been bricked in. Inside the building is open, with an timber floor and exposed wooden trusses.

Just to its north is a flat-roofed square five-story brick structure, the other warehouse. It has entrances, both overhead and normal, on all its facades. On the north elevation two vertical bays of windows rise the full height, complemented on the south by two large loading dock doors. A stone course separates the first floor from those above. Inside it has concrete floors with mushroom columns.

=== Other structures and objects ===
At the south entrance is a gatehouse. It is an octagonal one-story brick structure with a metallic roof. Since it was built in the later 20th century, it is the only one of the four buildings on the property considered non-contributing to the National Register listing.

There are also four small pumphouses on the west side of the mill, surrounding the fire hydrants built there at the same time as the factory. They are considered contributing structures to the listing, as are the ponds on the south (the only significant resource on the property in the city of Albany) and west of the building. The fence around the western pond is, however, of more modern construction, and is the only other non-contributing resource on the property besides the gatehouse.

== History ==
For most of its existence, the history of the complex has been the history of the Albany Felt Company.

=== 1895–1901: Founding ===
Three partners, including Parker Corning, later a U.S. Congressman and uncle of Albany's long-serving 20th-century mayor Erastus Corning, started the Albany Felt Company in 1895 when the services of one of the industry's best felt makers, Duncan Fuller, became available after the plant he had been working at burned down. Felt was a thriving industry in Albany at the time since the city was a center of papermaking in late 19th century America due to the proximity of the Adirondack Mountains and their expanses of evergreen softwood forests. The textile material was necessary to clothe the Fourdrinier machines that had dominated industrial papermaking since the middle of the century, bracing the paper rolls and helping to dry them.

With an initial investment of $40,000, the partners hired Fuller and leased space on Thacher Street in North Albany, almost a mile (1.6 km), south of the current buildings' location. Fuller had recently patented a new method of making felt, and within a year the company had 36 employees. While there were several other industrial felt makers in the country providing product to paper mills at the time, Albany Felt had the advantage of a location close to a major source of wood, deep cash reserves, and a skilled superintendent. Before the turn of the century it had done well enough to hire a salesman who visited mills all over the Northeast.

Along with the paper industry as a whole, the company grew. By 1901 its sales had increased fourfold. The company realized it had to expand its facilities to keep up with demand. Albany Felt bought five acres (2.0 ha) just north of the city line in what was then part of the town of Watervliet.

=== 1902–1920: Construction of plant ===
The new site was, like the original one, close to major transportation routes such as the Watervliet Turnpike, complete with trolley lines, the Erie Canal and the Hudson River. The Albany Northern Railroad's tracks ran just east of the site; it built a siding to accommodate construction of the building designed by the firm of Lockwood, Greene and Company. The smaller of the two warehouses, originally sided in clapboard, was also constructed at the same time to store building materials after they were unloaded from the trains. When the new building, designed to withstand the vibrations of the heavy machinery and consisting of the stair tower and the first section of the main plant, opened in 1902, the company had reached 150 employees. A small dye house was built for that part of the process north of the warehouse, on the site of the current larger warehouse.

There was one problem, however. At the time Watervliet had no fire department, and the nearest one was in downtown Albany, several miles to the south. Such a slow response time in the event of a fire such as the one that had destroyed Fuller's previous place of employment was not a risk the Felt Company's management could retain, and so they created their own fire department for the plant. To provide water to douse any flames, they diverted Rendert's Stream, a small tributary of the Hudson that flowed through the site, into a 390,000-US-gallon (1,500 m^{3}) reservoir with fire hydrants to be used in such an event.

Later this was supplemented by the one on the south end. There were sometimes dryer fires to put out, but no major conflagrations since those could be extinguished before they spread far. The ponds were converted into decorative ponds in later years when the installation of a sprinkler system made them unnecessary.

By 1910 it was necessary to add more production space, so Albany Felt bought more land and commissioned Lockwood to design the first extension, a northern wing that doubled the available space. In 1918 the company's executives decided to move their offices to the new plant from the original Thacher Street location. They commissioned from Lockwood, Greene a design for an architecturally sympathetic administrative wing, on the southwest corner of the plant. At the time only two stories were needed.

The rapid growth of the paper industry had led to mergers and consolidations during the 1910s. At the outset of the 1920s, two of these larger companies, International Paper and American Writing Paper, came to dominate the industry. Albany Felt, now with 223 employees, had become the second largest company in its industry, and sold to both International and American. But Corning, who took over as company president in 1920, saw the need to have a wide range of customers, and began to look to markets abroad. That year, the size of the plant was tripled with the extension to the northeast, using more modern window designs and steel framing as its structural system in order to better withstand the vibrations of the machines.

=== 1920–1941: Consolidation to Menands ===
The economic prosperity of the Roaring Twenties boosted demand for disposable paper products even higher, further spurring Albany Felt's growth. By 1925 it was reporting $2.5 million in annual sales. Even then, Corning was anticipating that the explosive growth of the era would not persist, and made sure the company was operating at peak efficiency so as to better weather the inevitable recession. His concerns did not prevent the company from adding the two upper stories to the administrative wing in 1927, adding some ornamentation in the process.

When the Great Depression did finally come with the 1929 stock market crash, Corning's preparations proved prudent. Albany Felt recovered quickly, and not only continued to be profitable but even grew. By 1937 it had reached $3 million in annual sales, and expanded the main building yet again to triple its original size, adding the wing at the southeast. A boardroom, whose original woodwork remains, was also created in the first floor of the administrative wing, with the bay window added on the north facade.

In 1941, the U.S. entered World War II, increasing demand for paper products. Albany Felt had reached a valuation of $5 million. Corning, in his last years as president, had a new five-story warehouse built on the site of the old dye house to store raw materials.

=== 1942–1954: Completion of facility ===
Corning died two years later, and his cousin Lewis Parker took over as company president. He oversaw continued growth and investment after the war. In 1948, another two-story office wing was built on the southeast of the building, complementing the administrative wing opposite.

By 1950, the company was worth $14 million. Two years later, it established a Canadian subsidiary to handle its increasing international growth. The last major addition to the facility came in 1954, when the southeast wing was topped off with two stories, bringing it even with the southwest wing and giving the building its present form.

=== 1955–present: Departure of Albany Felt and remodeling ===
After that, the company's expansions and new construction would take place elsewhere as it increased its presence both in other regions of the United States and overseas. In 1969, reflecting its acquisition of the Wisconsin-based Appleton Wire Works and Swedish felt maker Nordiska Maskinfilt, the company changed its name to Albany International and began diversifying, producing other materials for industrial use besides felt. Its headquarters remained in Albany, however, and some improvements were made to the interior, from adding a research laboratory in 1966 to an additional stair a decade later. In the late 1970s, the headquarters functions were moved to space in an office park nearby

During the 1980s the boiler rooms were added to the west facade, with additional space for equipment storage. Inside, the second floor was remodeled, with a new HVAC system installed. In 1988, the newest building in the complex, the gatehouse at the south entrance, was added. The entrance pavilion and a parking lot were built.

Following those renovations, most production operations were moved out to a new plant in East Greenbush starting in 1988. This allowed the building to once again be used as the company's headquarters. Most later renovations to the building focused on optimizing its use as office space.

By the early 21st century, with the company's operations increasingly international and concerned with materials besides industrial felt, even the need for headquarters staff was less evident. PrimaLoft, a division that made insulation for use in outdoor clothing, established its own headquarters in the southeast wing after being spun off.

In the early 2010s, all associations between the building and the company that had occupied it for over a century ended. The last felts were produced there in 2011. Albany International moved its headquarters to Rochester, New Hampshire, where its growing aerospace composites division was already based, in 2013. PrimaLoft, too, moved to larger headquarters in nearby Latham, that same year.

A local developer, Uri Kaufman, who had already converted Harmony Mills, a former textile mill in nearby Cohoes that has been designated a National Historic Landmark, bought the property for $30 million. He rented part of it to a self-storage business. In 2015 he announced plans to convert the building into 145-unit luxury apartments, and add amenities such as a preschool, outdoor pool, tennis courts and golf simulator.

== See also ==
- Architecture of Albany, New York
- National Register of Historic Places listings in Albany, New York
- National Register of Historic Places listings in Albany County, New York
