= Albany International =

Felt manufacturer based in the U.S. state of New Hampshire

Albany International Corp.
- Formerly: Albany Felt Company
- Type: Public
- Traded as: NYSE: AIN (Class A): S&P 600 component; Russell 2000 component
- Industry: Industrial goods
- Founded: March 8, 1895; 131 years ago in Albany, New York, United States
- Founders: Parker Corning; Duncan Fuller; Selden Marvin; James W. Cox
- Headquarters: 216 Airport Drive, Rochester, New Hampshire, US
- Number of locations: 19
- Area served: Worldwide
- Key people: Gunnar Kleveland (president and CEO); Joseph M. Gaug (general counsel and company secretary)Will Station (CFO)
- Products: Machine clothing; Composite materials
- Revenue: ▲US$ 863.7 million (Net sales) (2017)
- Operating income: ▲US$76.2 million
- Net income: ▲US$ 295.8 million (2017)
- Number of employees: 4,400 (2017)
- Divisions: Albany Engineered Composites; Machine Clothing
- Website: albint.com

Albany International Corp., originally the Albany Felt Company, is an industrial-goods company based in Rochester, New Hampshire, United States. It makes two different lines of products: machine clothing, in particular, felts for use in paper manufacturing and textile processing; and composites used in the aerospace industry. Its shares trade on the New York Stock Exchange under the ticker symbol AIN. It is included in both the S&P 600 and the Russell 2000 stock indices.

The company was founded in Albany, New York, in 1895 to make felts, serving the many paper mills in the region. It grew and prospered throughout the early 20th century, even during the Great Depression. In the later half of the 20th century, it began acquiring overseas firms and expanding into the composites sector. In 2013 it moved its headquarters to New Hampshire to better serve its aerospace customers.

== Overview ==
Albany International has two divisions: Albany Engineered Composites and Machine Clothing. The former is primarily used in aerospace applications to help make craft lighter, such as the main brace on the landing gear assembled by Messier-Bugatti-Dowty for the 787 Dreamliner, the first use of structural composites in that part of a commercial airliner. Machine Clothing, headquartered in Neuhausen, Switzerland, is the company's traditional core business, descending from the felts used in early paper machines, still accounting for 68% of its sales in 2017. Specialized textiles that brace and dry paper as it travels through the machines that make it still makes up the majority of the Machine Clothing product line. Other customers for these engineered fabrics include makers of building products, such as flooring, shingles, and carpet, and tanners (the company claims to be the largest manufacturer of felts for leather manufacture in the world). Its competitors include one other American company, Xerium Technologies, and two privately held foreign concerns, Valmet Fabrics Oy and Asahi Kasei Spandex Europe GmbH.

Corporate headquarters is outside the city of Rochester, New Hampshire, near Skyhaven Airport, along with Albany Engineered Composites' main plant and a research and development center. The company operates 18 other facilities in nine other countries. The Machine Clothing division's plants account for most of these; its textiles are made in Brazil Canada, China, Mexico, South Korea, and several European countries as well as at several locations in the United States. Composites are also made in Salt Lake City Utah, Boerne Texas, and Commercy France. The company also operates research centers in Sélestat, France, and Halmstad, Sweden.

== History ==
Albany International has grown steadily since its founding. For over a century, it was based in the city from which it takes its name.

=== 19th-century American paper industry ===
In the late 19th century, much of the growing American paper industry was based along the Hudson River in and around the cities of Albany and Troy, due to the cities' proximity to the ample softwood forests of the nearby Adirondack Mountains, the major raw material for papermaking. To make paper, manufacturers used the Fourdrinier paper machine developed early in the century, which could make continuous paper rolls. In order to do so, its belts needed to be clothed in special felts that could both brace paper and help dry it.

A dozen companies were already providing felt for Albany's paper mills in the early 1890s when one of them, the Albany Huyck felt mill, burned down in 1894. This left its talented superintendent, Duncan Fuller, who had patented a new weaving method, jobless. He was soon re-employed by the three founding partners of the newly formed Albany Felt Company.

=== 1895–1901: Startup years ===
The company was incorporated on March 8, 1895. It had several advantages that gave it the confidence to enter a crowded market—an ideal location near many potential customers and Fuller's proven expertise. Most significant were the partners themselves–Selden Marvin, a local bank president who served as the company's first secretary; James Cox, its first president, and Parker Corning, vice president.

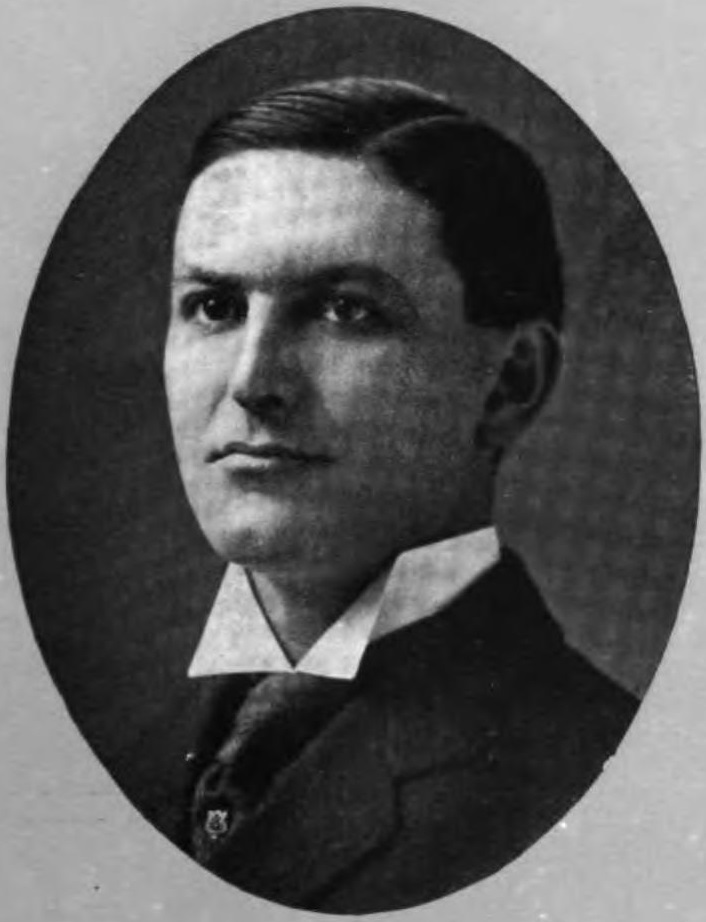
Corning, ca. 1910

Corning was a member of a family prominent in Albany business and politics—his nephew, Erastus, later served as the city's mayor for four decades—and had just graduated from Yale. The family provided most of the company's initial capital. His father put up most of the company's initial $40,000 in cash, and the family's prize-winning herd of Southdown sheep were fleeced for most of the company's wool.

The new company needed to first set up a plant, and space was found on Thacher Street in northern Albany, at the corner of the Cornings' 700-acre (280 ha) family farm. By the summer of 1895, 36 workers were using seven rented looms on the property. In 1896 the company recorded $27,000 in sales.

=== 1902–1946: Rapid growth ===
Within five years that number had more than quadrupled, following continued growth in the paper industry. Albany Felt was selling its products to paper makers all over the Northeast. The Thacher Street plant was at maximum capacity. Management decided to expand and purchased five acres (2.0 ha) straddling the boundary between Albany and what was at the time the town of Colonie to its north. The new facility was completed in 1902.

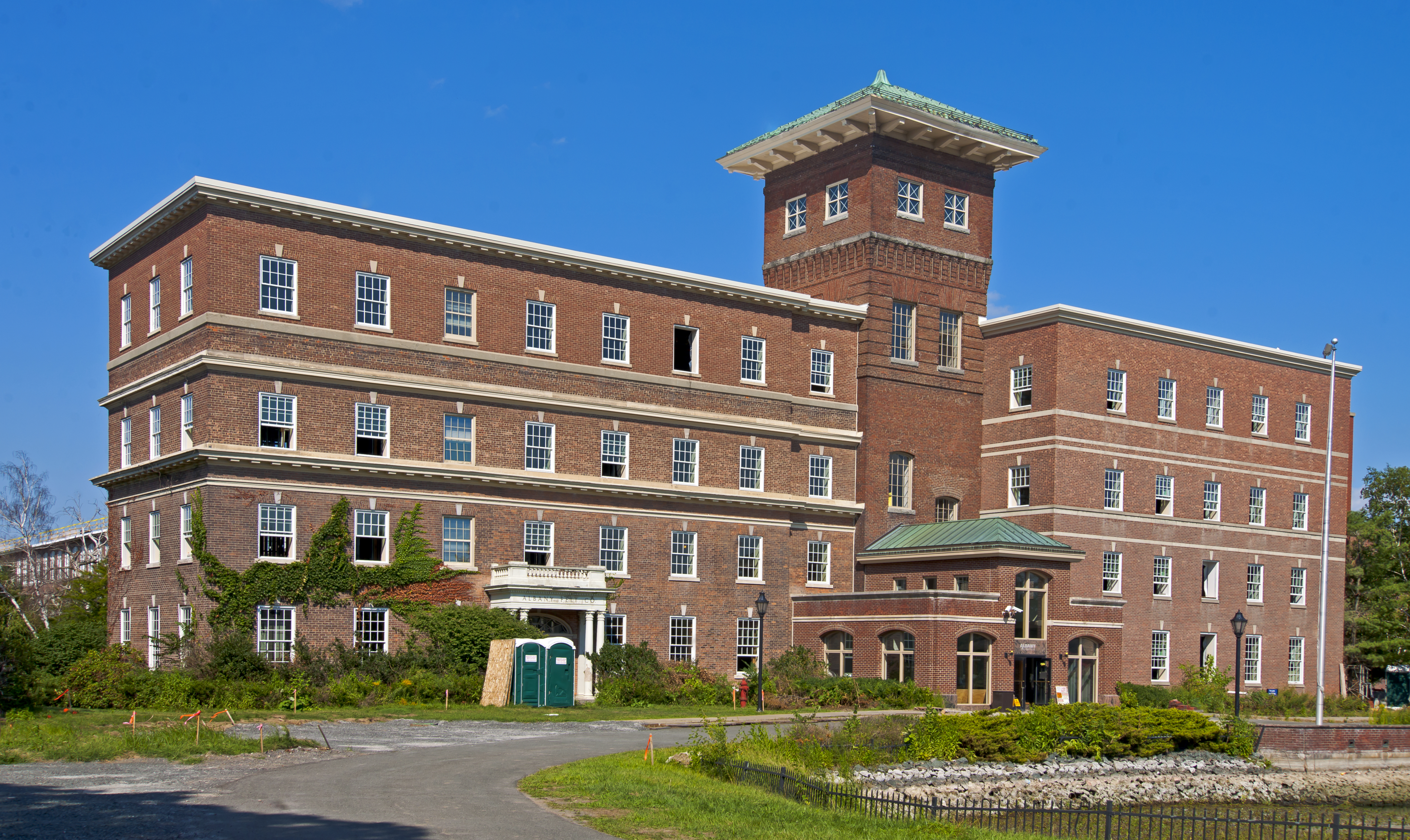
The 1902 headquarters building, now listed on the National Register of Historic Places

By 1920 sales had increased to $2 million annually, making the company the second largest in the industry, as Albany Felt continued to serve the rapidly consolidating American paper industry. The new plant, now corporate headquarters as well, had been expanded more than once to accommodate the company's 223 employees. In 1923, the same year Corning, who had replaced Cox as president in 1918, stepped away from the company to serve the first of six terms in the U.S. House of Representatives, he began implementing his plans to sell to customers outside the U.S. as well.

The following year the village of Menands was incorporated in the area around the plant, giving the company the address it would be known by for decades afterward. By 1925 sales had reached $2.5 million with the growth of the Roaring Twenties economy, leading to another expansion of the plant which doubled its size. Corning's focus on efficiency and expanding markets made it very easy for the company to not only survive but prosper when the Great Depression began in 1929. Within three years sales had again reached $2 million; in 1937 they reached $3 million, prompting another expansion of the plant.

Corning, the only founder still alive by that time, had returned from Congress to take a more active role in the company. U.S. entry into World War II in 1941 again increased demand as paper suppliers sought to meet new defense contracts. After Corning's death two years later, control of the company passed to his cousin Lewis Parker.

=== 1947–1969: International expansion ===
The end of the war and the return to prosperity opened up new economic possibilities for many American firms, and Albany Felt was no exception. Parker realized that the company would need to start producing its fabrics closer to its increasingly distant customers. By 1947 extra production capacity was opened up in Albany, and the main building was expanded yet again to increase office space the next year. Four years later, with the company having built up a large enough customer base in Canada, it created a Canadian subsidiary and built a 90,000-square-foot (8,400 m^{2}) plant in Cowansville, Quebec, its first expansion outside the Capital District.

It was soon followed by a plant in the Southeast and, in 1954, the last expansion of the Menands corporate headquarters building. During the next two decades, Albany Felt entered even more foreign markets in a production capacity. Joint ventures brought the company to Latin America, Scandinavia, France, the Netherlands, and Australia, as well as into product lines beyond industrial felt.

This growth led to a major turning point in the company's history. In 1969 management found itself confronted with a hostile takeover attempt. To fend it off, Albany Felt merged with Wisconsin's Appleton Wire Works, another manufacturer of paper machine clothing, and Swedish feltmaker Nordiska Maskinfilt. The new company was renamed Albany International. It had 6,242 employees, twice as many as Albany Felt had had before, and became the world's first company that provided fabrics for all stages of the papermaking process worldwide.

=== 1970–1988: Going public ===
In 1972, Albany International introduced its current logo. This coincided with another momentous event in the company's history—later that year, it went public. In July 1974 its shares began trading on the New York Stock Exchange (NYSE).

During the 1970s the company continued to grow through further acquisitions. Among these were machine-clothing companies in England, Brazil, and Norway, as well as a Boston-area research firm. Reflecting its widening focus, in 1976 management moved the company's headquarters to the nearby, recently renovated Henry M. Sage Estate, nearby in Menands. Production and lower-level management activities continued at the original building.

These acquisitions came with an increasing debt load. In 1983, at the behest of the largest group of shareholders, management took the company private again via a leveraged buyout. To make that work, Albany International focused on its core business, selling many of the acquisitions it had made not directly related to papermaking. At the same time, it modernized production within that area and increased its efficiency. Four years after going private, the shareholders voted to take the company public again. Shares traded first on the NASDAQ in 1987 and were once again listed on the NYSE in 1988.

At the same time, the company moved its headquarters back to the original building. To make room for upper management again, most production that had been going on there was instead moved to a plant across the Hudson in East Greenbush. Some renovations were made to the building to accommodate this change.

=== 1989–present: Composites and move from Albany ===
The 1990s posed new challenges for the newly republicized Albany International. A worldwide recession in the early years of the decade squeezed customers, while the end of the Cold War opened up new markets. The company continued its strategy of acquisitions and aggressively entering new markets while increasing its own efficiency wherever possible.

Asia, where the company had no previous presence, was the first target. Albany International opened a plant in Chungju, South Korea. It entered the potentially vast Chinese market by first purchasing an existing machine-clothing manufacturer in Guangzhou's Panyu District. These were accompanied by new plants in Europe.

The next year the company acquired Techniweave, a maker of aerospace composites in Rochester, New Hampshire. It was merged with a Texas-based composite manufacturer in 2006. The combined companies formed the basis of Albany Engineered Composites, a growing part of the company's sales and profits today.

In 2007 Albany International built its first plant in China, in the coastal city of Hangzhou. That same year the company began a multiyear restructuring process aimed at remaining competitive in the long term. It sold noncore businesses such as its filtration division and Albany Door Systems, a maker of high-speed industrial doors, acquired by Swedish lockmaker Assa Abloy in 2011. PrimaLoft, an insulating fabric developed by the company for the U.S. military, was spun off.

The company implemented Six Sigma and lean manufacturing processes to improve its efficiency at all levels. It was thus able to weather the Great Recession of 2008 and improve its performance afterward, as it had 80 years earlier when the Depression struck. Growth, particularly in the composites business, led management to move the company's headquarters out of the Albany area.

At the beginning of 2011, the company officially made Rochester its headquarters. The last production in the Menands building ended that same year. However, it took two more years for all remaining operations to be removed to Rochester. In 2012 the building was sold to a developer who has since converted it into apartments; the company moved its remaining operations out the year afterward. The complex was listed on the National Register of Historic Places in 2014, recognizing the fact that despite expansions it had remained unchanged architecturally since the early 20th century.

== Future ==
The company describes its current strategy as "focus and lead". In more specific terms, it means making sure the cash flow from its Machine Clothing division remains steady while working, through a joint venture with Safran, to complete its contribution to the CFM International LEAP aircraft engine under development. This will in turn further increase Albany Engineered Composites' position within its market. In his 2015 letter to shareholders, Chief Executive Officer Joseph Morone pointed to General Electric's recent choice of Albany as the supplier of the fan case for its GE9X engines as a step toward this goal.

Despite recent declines in sales, management sees the company as progressing toward those goals. In his letter, Morone points to an increase in adjusted EBITDA despite increased spending on research and development. At the same time, the company was able to pay down $32 million in debt, and fully fund its pension plans in the U.S., U.K., and Canada.

Strategic acquisitions are also a continuing part of the company's growth strategy. In February 2016 Albany agreed to acquire Harris Corp.'s aero-structures division, itself bought from Exelis just the year before, which makes composites used primarily in airframes, for a total consideration of $210 million, paid for partially out of the company's cash on hand, with the rest coming from an increase to its revolving credit facility. Morone said that while the division had growth opportunities, the company saw "complementarity" between it and Albany Engineered Composites that could further increase earnings in the medium term.

== See also ==
- Companies listed on the New York Stock Exchange (A)
- Economy of New Hampshire
- List of S&P 600 companies
