= Harmony Mill No. 3 =

- U.S. National Register of Historic Places
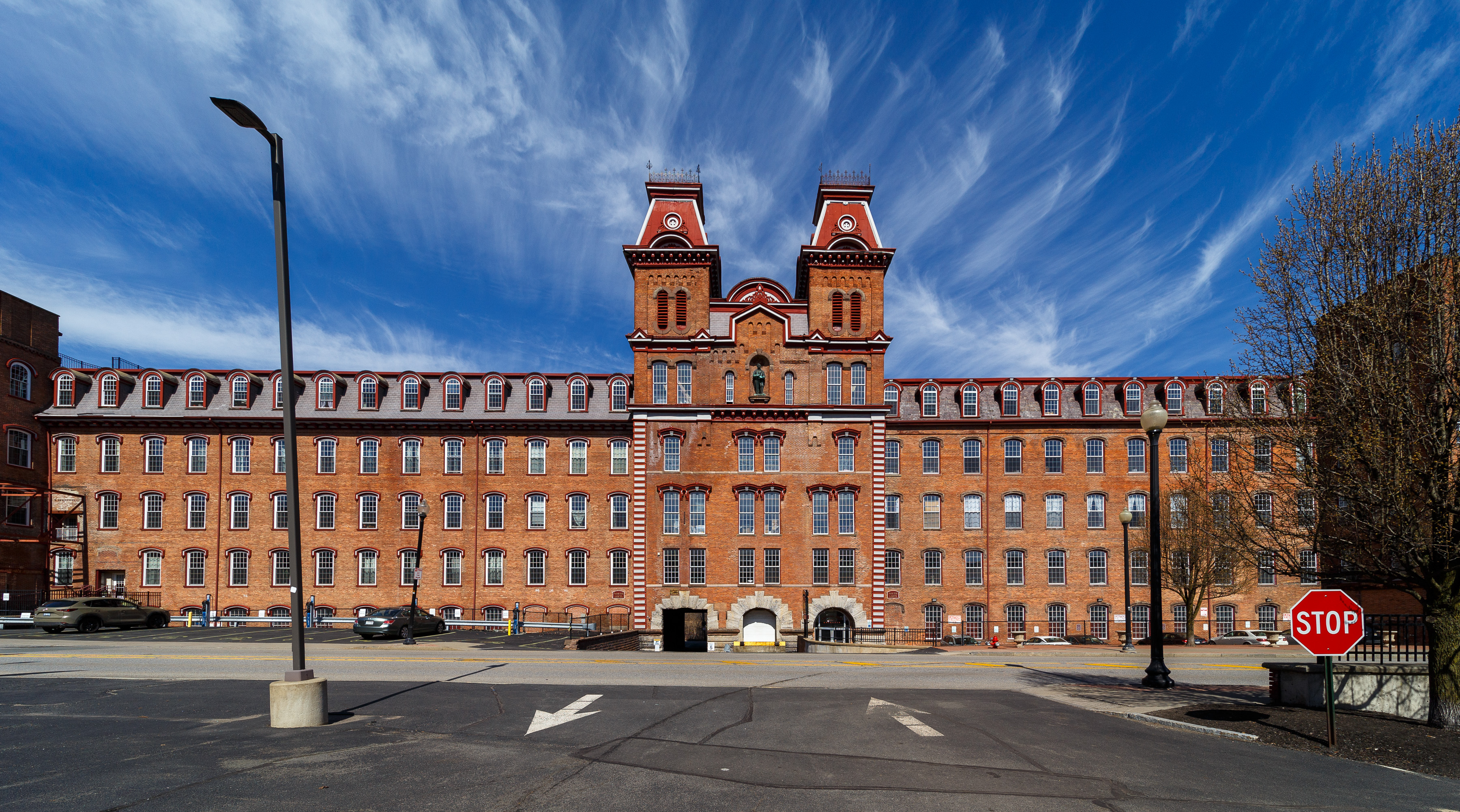
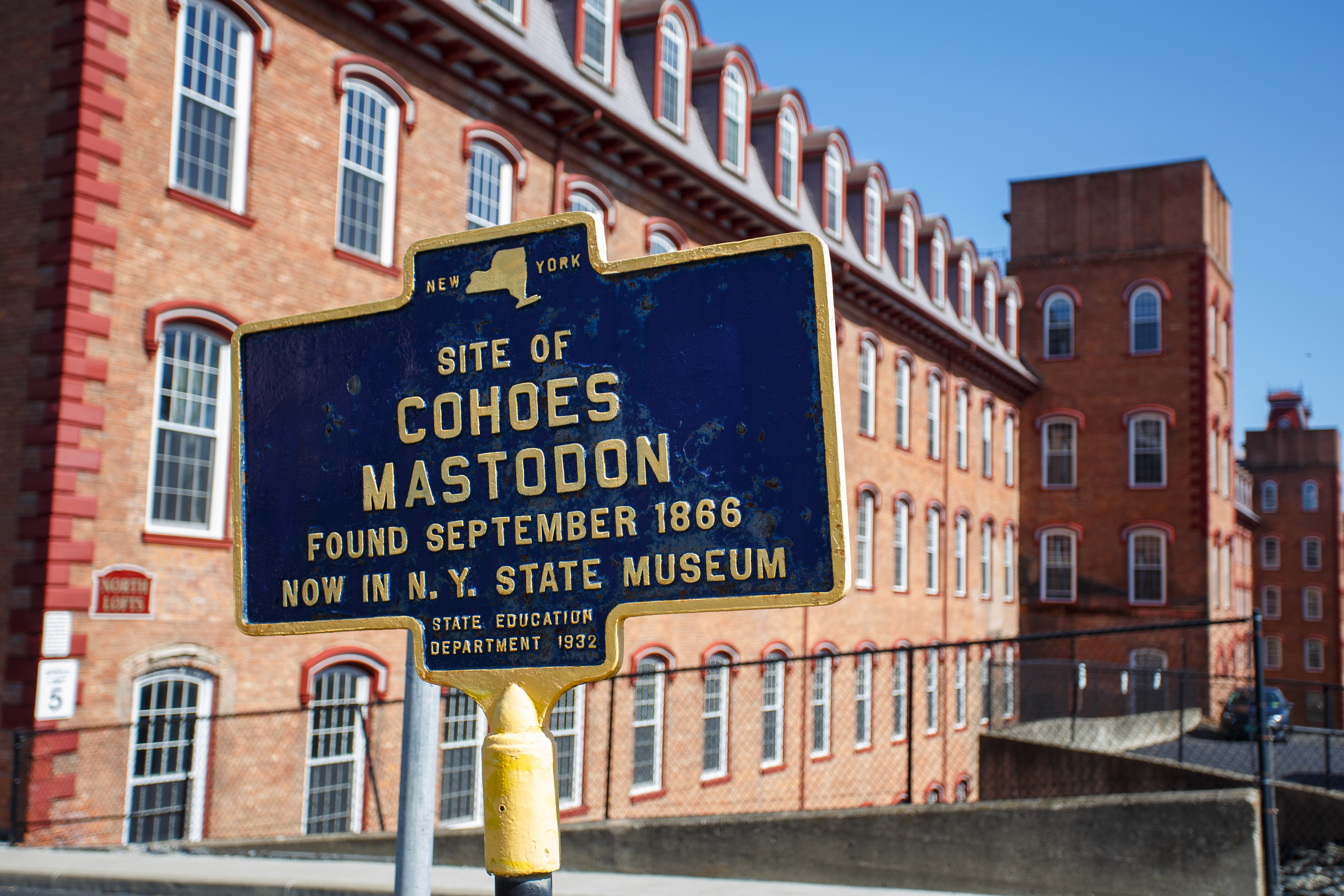
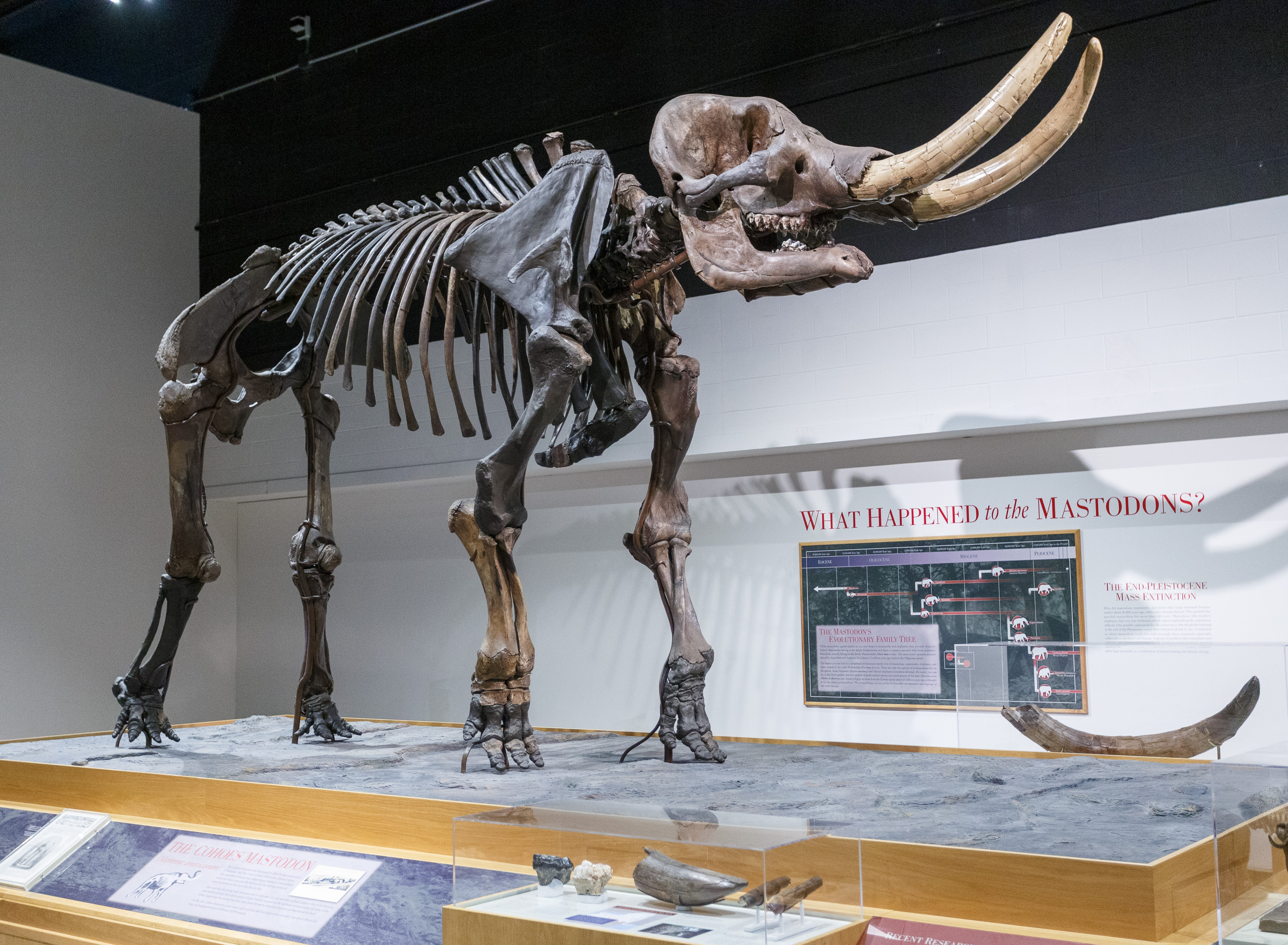
- Mill No. 3 Mastodon plaque Mastodon in the New York State Museum

- Location within New York Location within the United States
- Location: 100 N. Mohawk St., Cohoes, New York
- Coordinates: 42°46′54″N 73°42′19″W
- Area: 0 acres (0 ha)
- Built: 1866-1868
- Architect: Van Auken, D.H.
- NRHP reference No.: 71000525
- Added to NRHP: February 18, 1971

Harmony Mill No. 3, also known as the "Mastodon Mill", is a historic mill located at Cohoes in Albany County, New York. It was built in 1866–1868 and expanded 1871–1872. It is a four-story red brick structure on a stone foundation, with an additional story under the distinctive mansard roof. It features twin six story towers topped by mansard roofs and cast iron grillwork. It was known as the "Mastodon Mill" for the skeleton of a mastodon found while excavating the north section. It is the centerpiece of the Harmony Mills Historic District.

It was listed on the National Register of Historic Places in 1971.
