= Harmony Mills =

- Harmony Mills Historic District
- U.S. National Register of Historic Places
- U.S. National Historic Landmark District
- New York State Register of Historic Places
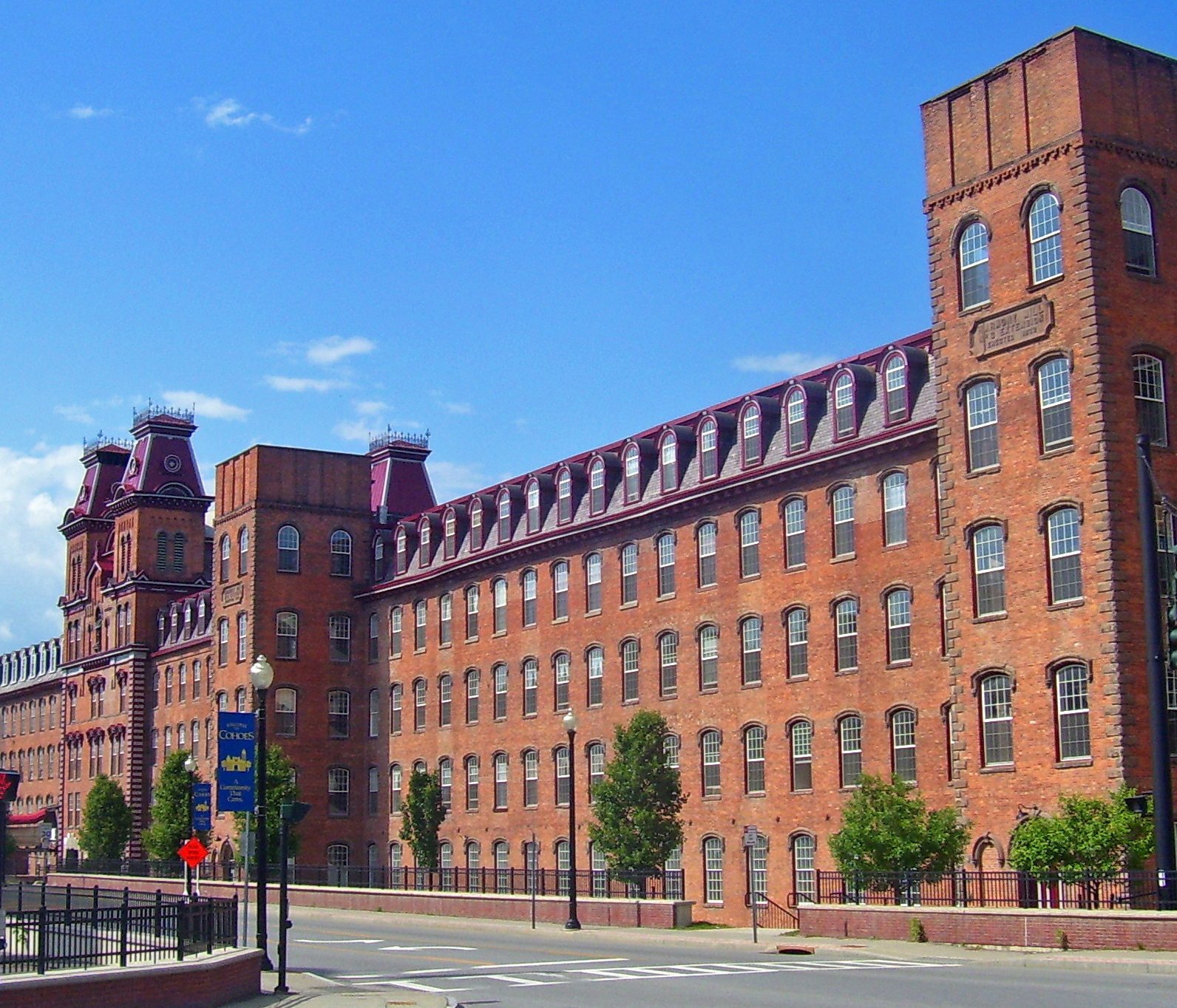
- Partial front elevation of mill building in 2008

- Location within New York Location within the United States
- Location: Cohoes, NY
- Coordinates: 42°46′52″N 73°42′15″W
- Architectural style: Second Empire
- NRHP reference No.: 78003151
- NYSRHP No.: 00141.000926

Significant dates
- Added to NRHP: January 12, 1978
- Designated NHLD: January 20, 1999
- Designated NYSRHP: June 23, 1980

Harmony Mills, in Cohoes, New York, United States, is an industrial district that is bordered by the Mohawk River and the tracks of the former Troy and Schenectady Railroad (now the Mohawk-Hudson bike trail). It was listed as Harmony Mills Historic District on the National Register of Historic Places in 1978. A portion of the district encompassing the industrial buildings and some of the housing built for millworkers was declared a National Historic Landmark in 1999. The centerpiece building, Harmony Mill No. 3 was listed on the National Register of Historic Places in 1971.

It was the largest cotton mill complex in the world when it opened in 1872, and is one of the finest examples of a large-scale textile mill complex outside of New England.

The complex went into decline after its largest tenant, Barclay Home Products, went out of business in 1988. Mill 2 burned down in 1995. Mill 1 suffered devastating damage in a second fire in 1998.

Developer Uri Kaufman purchased the complex in 2000.

In 2005–2006, a portion of Mill 3 was renovated and turned into high-end residential lofts. The 96 loft apartments completed in this first phase were at 100% occupancy by July, 2006. A second phase containing 135 units was completed in 2010, adding a pool and spa and other luxury amenities. This phase—98% leased as of July, 2012—was called Harmony Mills Fallsview Luxury Apartments because of the views of the Cohoes Falls.

A third phase, restoring Mills 1 & 4 was commenced in early 2013. Mill 4 was completed in early December, 2013. 31 of its 33 loft apartments were pre-leased prior to receipt of the Certificate of Occupancy on December 6, 2013. In all, the Harmony Mills now contains 340 luxury loft apartments.

The revival of the Mills sparked a revival of the City of Cohoes. In the 2010 census, the City gained population for the first time since 1930. According to a study by the Center for Economic Growth, Cohoes was the fastest growing city in New York State in both 2015 and 2016. The project has been hailed as a prime example of how adaptive re-use of historic buildings can revitalize cities, while clearing urban blight in an environmentally friendly manner.

For his efforts in restoring the Harmony Mills, Uri Kaufman was awarded the New York State Preservation League Excellence Award. The Harmony Mills is featured on the Home Page of the New York State Historic Preservation Office Website, as a leading example of historic preservation development.

== History ==
=== Origins ===
In 1836, “wealthy Spanish gentleman” Peter Harmony founded the Harmony Manufacturing Company in Cohoes, at the time a small village with a population of only 1,850 people in 1840. Among the first stockholders of the Harmony Manufacturing Company was Stephen van Rensselaer, the “Good Patroon” and founder of Rensselaer Polytechnic Institute. In 1837, the company’s first mill opened with a workforce of 250 people. Mill No. 1 was built on a hill overlooking Cohoes on the south bank of the Mohawk River. It cost $72,000 to build and had 3,000 spindles. In its first year of operation, mill workers produced 1.5 million yards of print cloth. The company also constructed three brick tenements to house its workers, which cost $300 each to build. From its founding, Harmony played a leading role in the economic and social lives of the people of Cohoes.

Due to the powerful Mohawk River Falls and the introduction of the Erie Canal, the location of the Harmony Mills was key to the success and vast expansion of the company. Despite its vast potential, the Harmony Manufacturing Company lost money almost every year until 1850, when it was sold at a forced auction by the sheriff to two New York businessmen, Thomas Garner of New York City and Alfred Wild of Kinderhook, NY. The company was renamed Harmony Mills and began its rise to local economic dominance.

=== Development ===
After its acquisition by Garner and Wild, Harmony Mills began to flourish under the management of Robert Johnston. Johnston was an English immigrant and expert mule spinner who became known for successfully spinning warp on mules, a task previously thought impossible. After moving from Rhode Island to New York, he worked for Wild, who bought the Harmony Manufacturing Company at his suggestion.

Johnston oversaw the expansion of Harmony Mills; in 1853, the first year it was incorporated, the physical size of Mill No. 1 was doubled. In the years leading up to the Civil War, Harmony Mills continued to expand by acquiring its competition, solidifying Harmony’s economic power and establishing a local cotton production monopoly. Increased cotton demand during the Civil War fueled its expansion. By the late 1860s, Harmony Mills had 203,000 spindles, the largest number of spindles in the United States for a single location; additionally, it had 3,100 employees to whom it collectively paid almost a million dollars a year. Johnston’s son David had also taken over his father’s role as supervisor, though Robert remained the general manager. By 1872, the year that Mill No. 3 was expanded to make it the largest cotton mill in the United States, the physical expansion of Harmony Mills was largely complete, and the acquisition of Ogden Mills in 1859 and Strong Mill in 1865 had cemented its monopoly over the Cohoes cotton industry.

=== Harmony Mills Buildings ===
==== Mill No. 1 ====
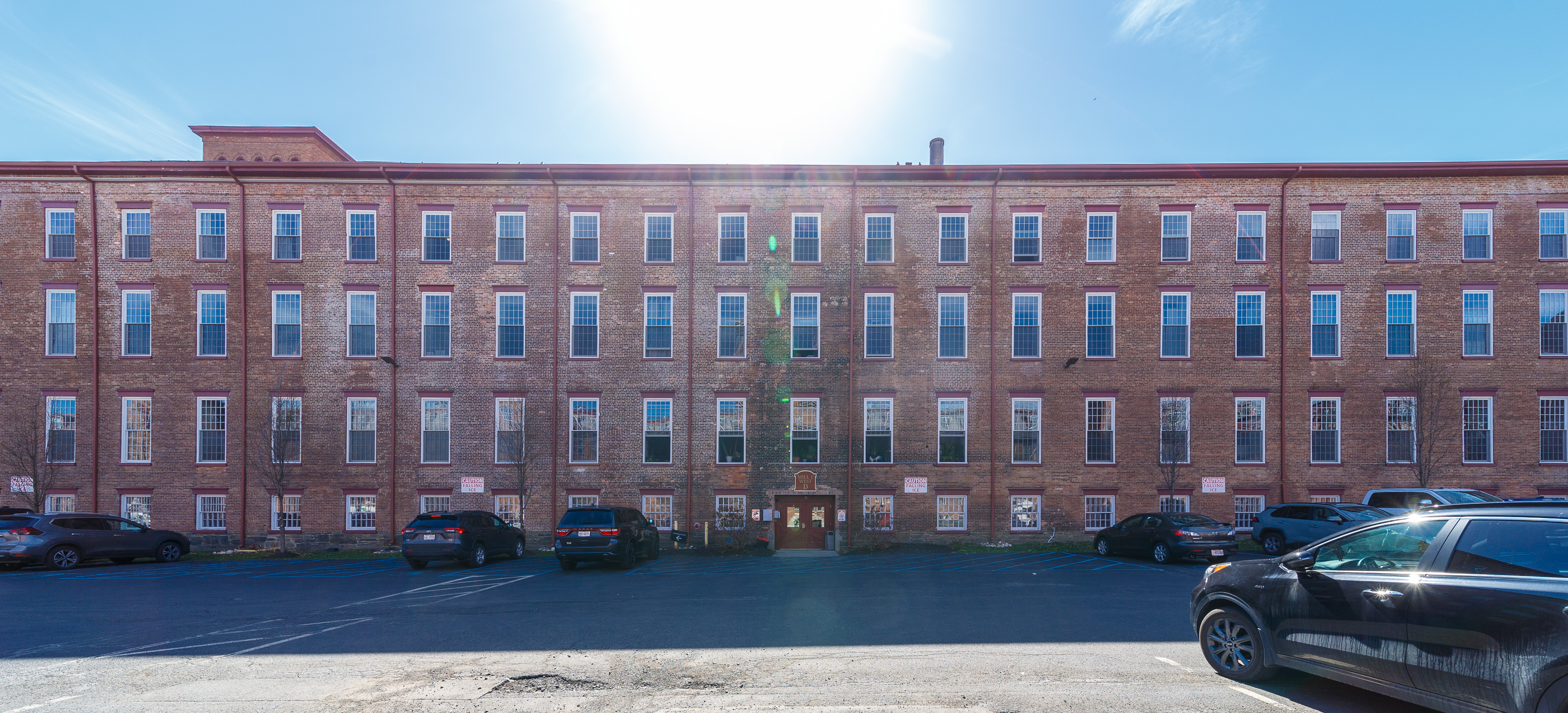
Mill No. 1

Completed in the year 1837, Mill No. 1 stood as the first textile mill to house the operations of the newly founded Harmony Manufacturing Company. Mimicking the gable-roofed like structures common to the Greek revival movement, these impressive architectural features can still be appreciated today. The construction of this mill prompted the realignment of the Erie Canal which originally sat on the east side to be shifted to the west side of the building (1837-1842). The east side was then used as a hydraulic canal for the growing company. Its location was critical since the western side of the building sat just a few yards from the Erie Canal's lock No. 16. Under Johnston's leadership, the company required the addition to the original Mill No.1. It consisted of an architecturally pleasing 5-story 274 foot long building and featured a large tower and arched entryway.

==== Picker House / Storehouse / Pump House ====
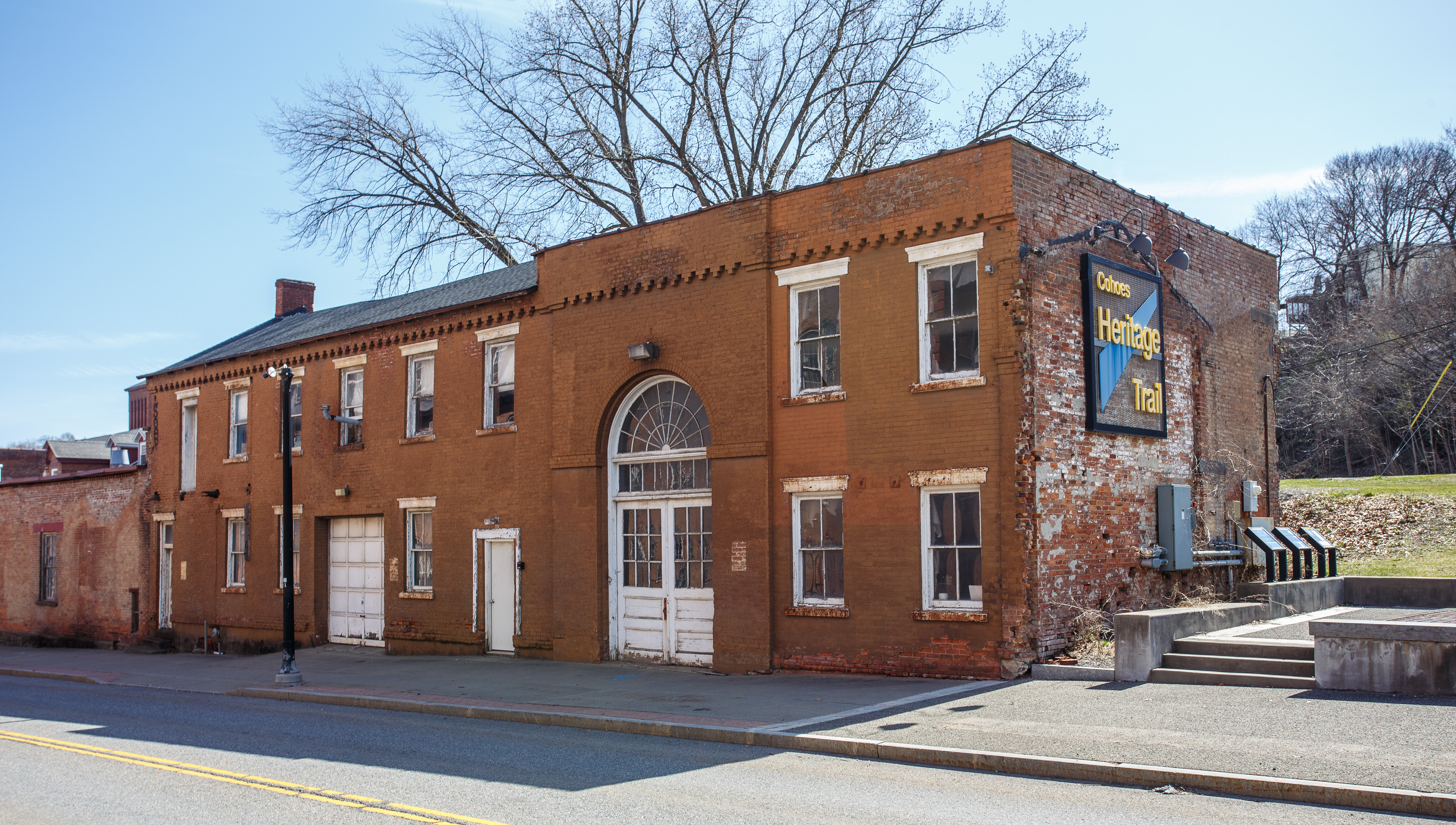
Pump House

In the year 1853, the inclusion of the Picker House was required to increase the efficiency of the growing production. To meet these needs, the Picker House was utilized for the opening and cleaning of the imported cotton bales as well as a storage space. This building and the structural portion of the walkway to Mill No.1 still remain today.

==== Mill No.2 ====
Erected in the year 1857, Mill No. 2 was a symbol of the ever growing production of cotton goods in Cohoes. To staff the mill, 500 workers were hired and 70 acres were purchased to construct additional tenement houses. This mill acted as an extension of Mill No.1 and later called for a fourth floor mansard roof addition in 1866. Unfortunately, the mill suffered severe damage from a fire in 1995 and has since been demolished.

==== Mill No.3 ====
Mastodon Mill (Mill No. 3)

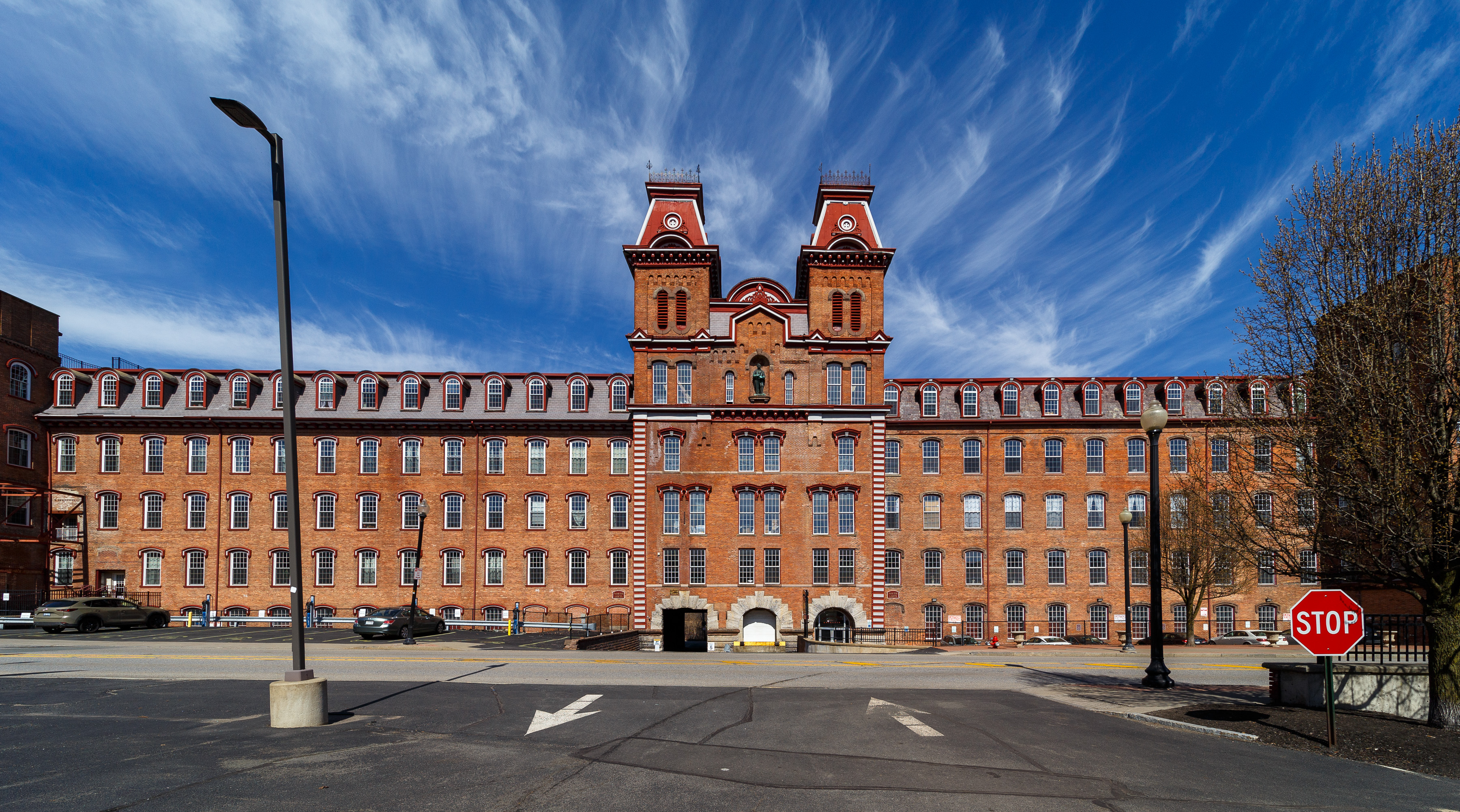
Mill No. 3

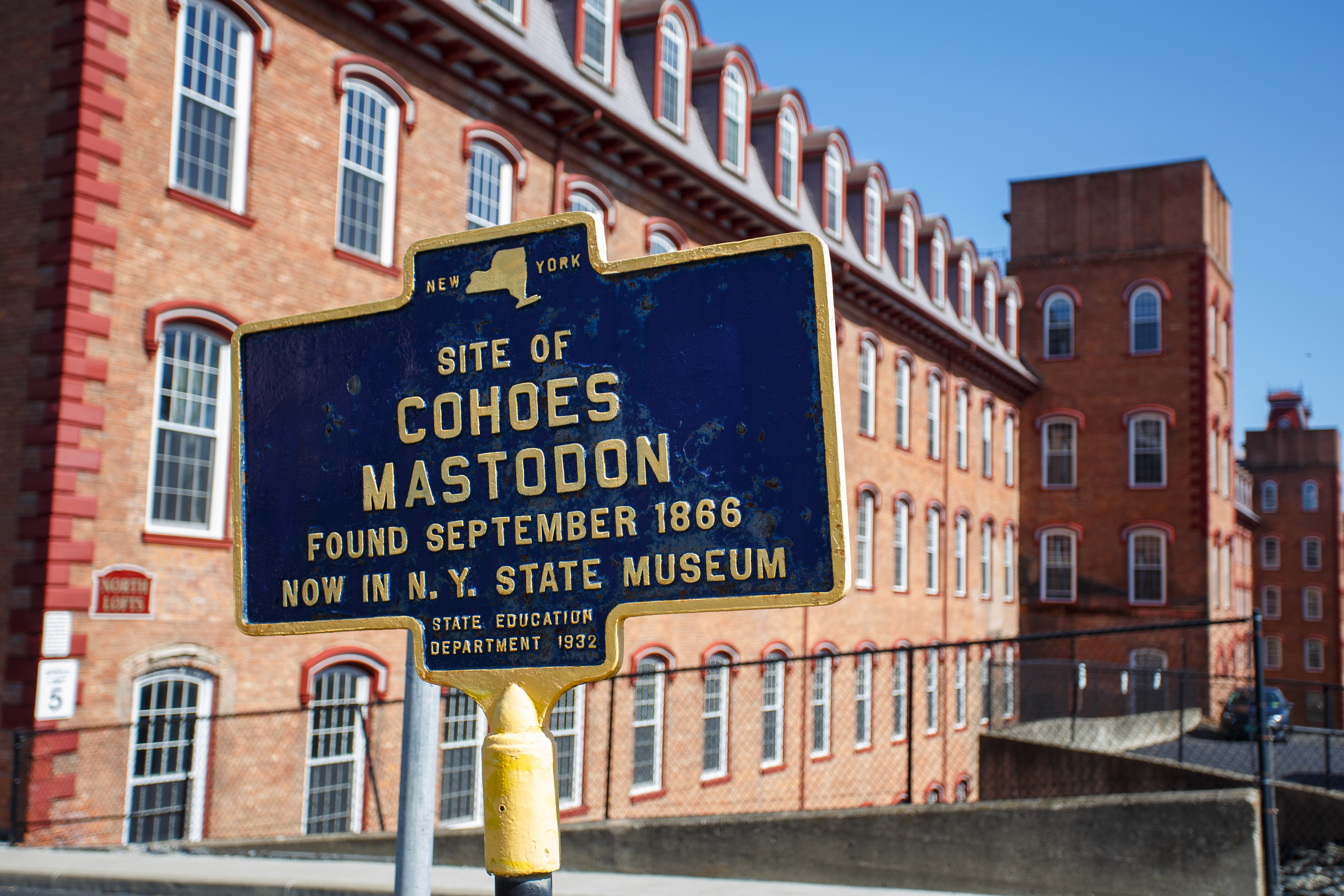
Mastodon plaque

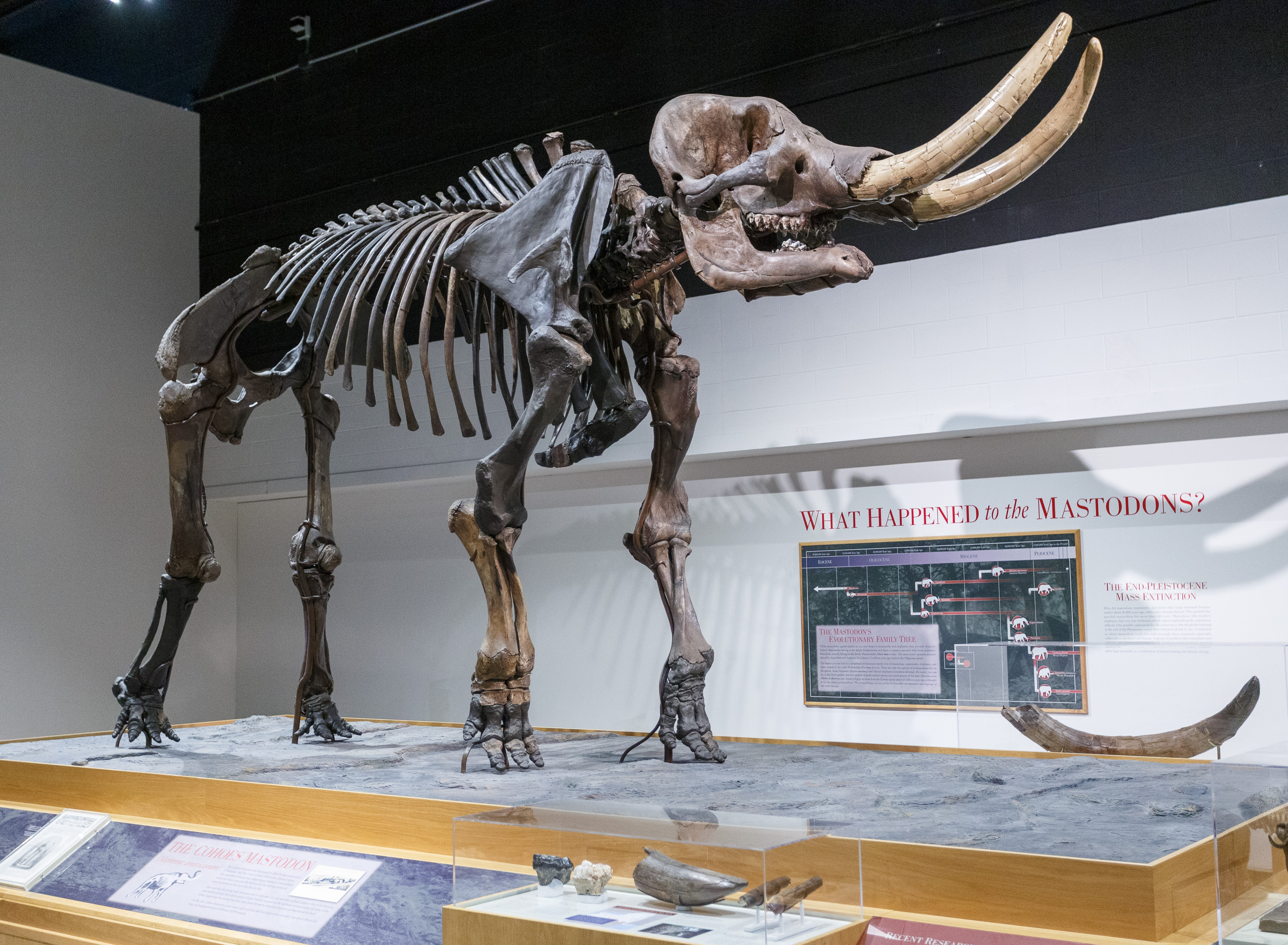
Mastodon in the New York State Museum

Years of continued success and an increase in production had allowed the most significant on the mills to begin construction in 1866. Due to the discovery of a prehistoric elephant’s skeleton during construction, the mill earned its nickname of the “Mastodon Mill”. With the first phase completed in 1868 and the second shortly after in 1872, Mill No. 3 stood with an astonishing foot print of 1,185 feet in length and 70–76 feet wide. Standing five stories tall and featuring Victorian styled aesthetic features such as the mansard roof and the bronze statue of Thomas Garner near the front two towers, Mill No. 3 was a symbol of tremendous success for the Harmony Factories. Housed in the basement of the mill were two 800 horsepower Boyden turbines which powered all of the machinery in that mill. With 130,000 spindles, 2,700 looms, and over seven miles of gas and water pipes, the Mastodon Mill became a destination for cotton capitalists from across the country.

==== Mill No.4 ====
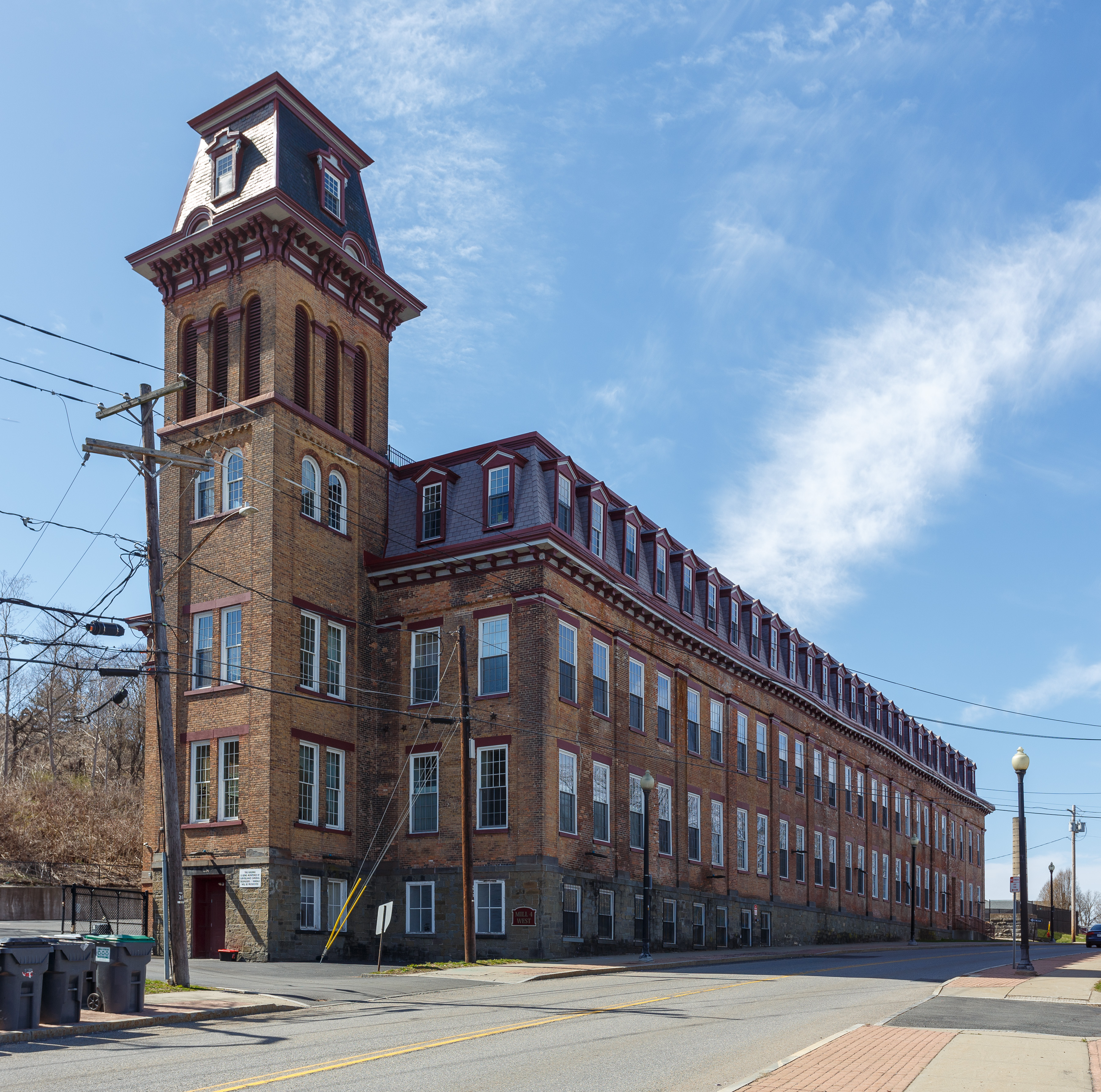
Mill No. 4

In 1872 the Harmony Company acquired what used to be the Van Benthuysen Mill and converted it into another cotton mill. This mill’s main responsibility was the production of cotton bags and jute.

==== Miscellaneous Buildings ====
In addition the main mills, there was the Boiler House (c. 1911), Office and Sunday School Building (c. 1853), and the Generator Plant. Today the Office and Sunday school building is utilized as a commercial building and is currently leased out by a Salon.

==== Tenements ====
The quick growth of the Harmony Mills accompanied by a large influx of immigrants from Europe and Quebec, Canada, allotted the Johnston’s the opportunity to provide an easily adaptable community to entire newcomers. To do so, they eventually constructed over 800 tenements to house these immigrants and their families at very mere costs as long as they worked in the mills. The rent of 5 to 7 dollars was automatically deducted from workers’ paychecks. This allowed the mills to employ over five thousand operatives and assisted Cohoes in becoming the nation’s largest producers of wool knit goods in the 1860s.

=== Life in Harmony Hill: 1860-1880 ===
==== Workers ====
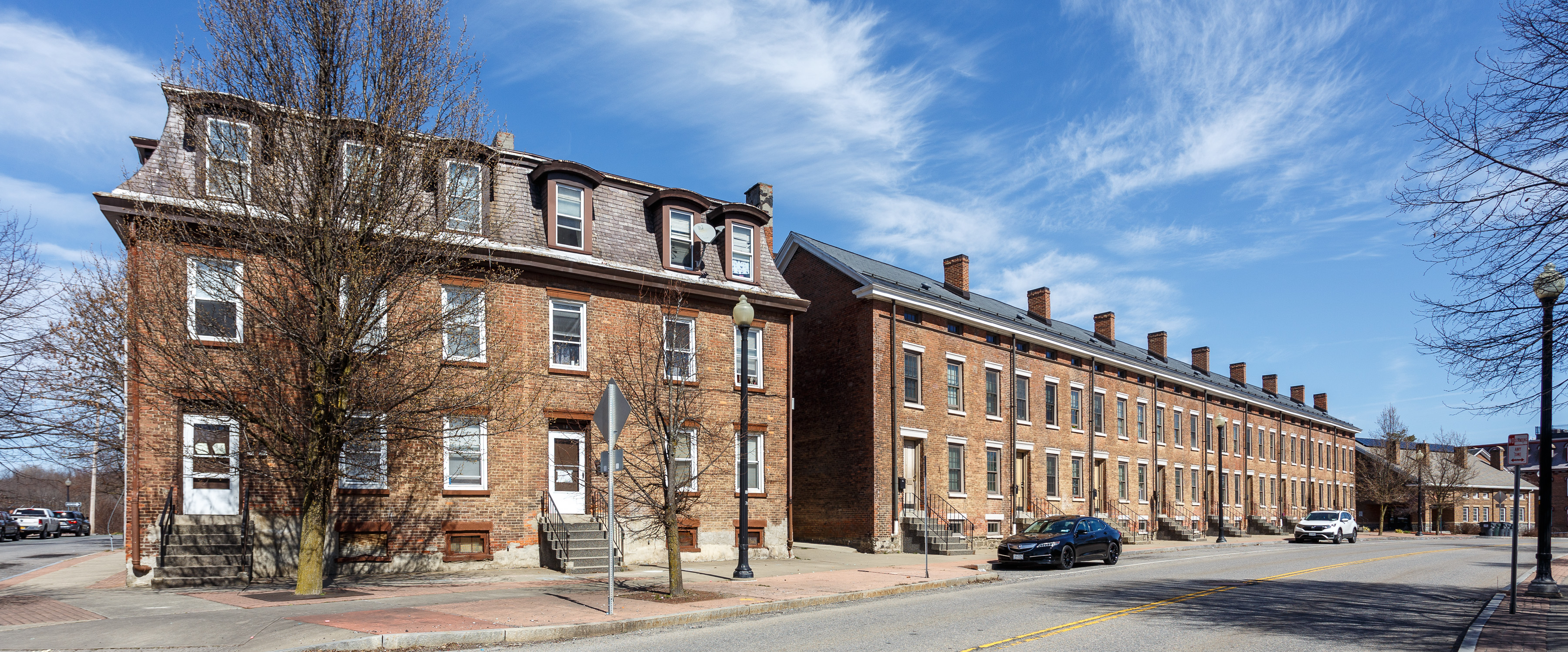
Harmony Mills worker housing on Mohawk Street

Harmony Hill was the name of the settlement of cotton workers that developed around the Harmony Mills complex. Examining the period from 1860 to 1880 gives an idea of a worker’s life in the heyday of Harmony Mills’ ascendance. In 1860, Harmony Mills’ workers were largely made up of young, unmarried Irish women. By 1880, an influx of French Canadian immigrants had shaken the Irish domination of the workforce, but the average unskilled Harmony Mills worker remained a young, unmarried immigrant woman. These women were paid low wages and did not have many prospects of upwards mobility, easing the decision to stay home after marriage. Higher-paying skilled jobs, with the exception of weavers, were generally the provenance of men, largely married Englishmen, who had fled from the working conditions of 19th century English textile mills. Women were deliberately kept out of skilled jobs such as mule spinners, either out of ostensible concern for their safety, or because existing workers did not want the lower rates women received to drag down their wages.

As a result, families needed to send their older children to work to make up for the mother staying home to raise the younger children, particularly in cases where a widowed or otherwise single mother was the head of the family. (It is estimated that almost one-quarter of cotton worker families was headed by a woman.) Harmony Mills offered employment to these children for wages as low as 30 cents for a 12-hour workday; hence, to keep these families afloat, between 1860 and 1880, the percentage of workers under 15 had tripled. In 1882, thirteen Harmony Hill families testified before a New York State legislative committee investigating child labor that they could not stay out of debt without sending their children to work. This debt generally resulted from buying necessities on credit due to the rising cost of living; for example, many families would purchase food on credit at the Harmony Mills Company store.

Thus, while immigrants fleeing from conditions such as the Great Famine of Ireland and the economic conditions of Quebec in the 1870s would have likely appreciated steady work, guaranteed housing, and the possibility of owning property someday, the Harmony Mills workers also had increasing incentives to organize against the company to better their working conditions.

==== The Labor Movement ====
The workers at Harmony Mills, and other Cohoes cotton mills, had a modest history of strikes. In 1842, for example, a 20% wage cut induced Harmony Mills workers, likely women, to strike, but these workers may have been fired for their actions. In 1858, a 3-week strike successfully convinced Harmony Mills to raise wages, but an attempt later that year to fully restore wages ended in violence.

But when Harmony Mills workers struck in 1863 against stagnant wages and reduced hours, it fizzled out after a week; this was the only strike against Harmony Mills from 1858 to 1880. Ultimately, attempts to organize Harmony Mills workers was unsuccessful; period accounts would describe the cotton mill workers as “well-behaved, content, and benign”. Part of this can be attributed to the workforce being majority female; not only were women of this period expected to be passive, but Harmony Mills’ female workers also did not expect to work full-time after marriage.

== Gallery ==
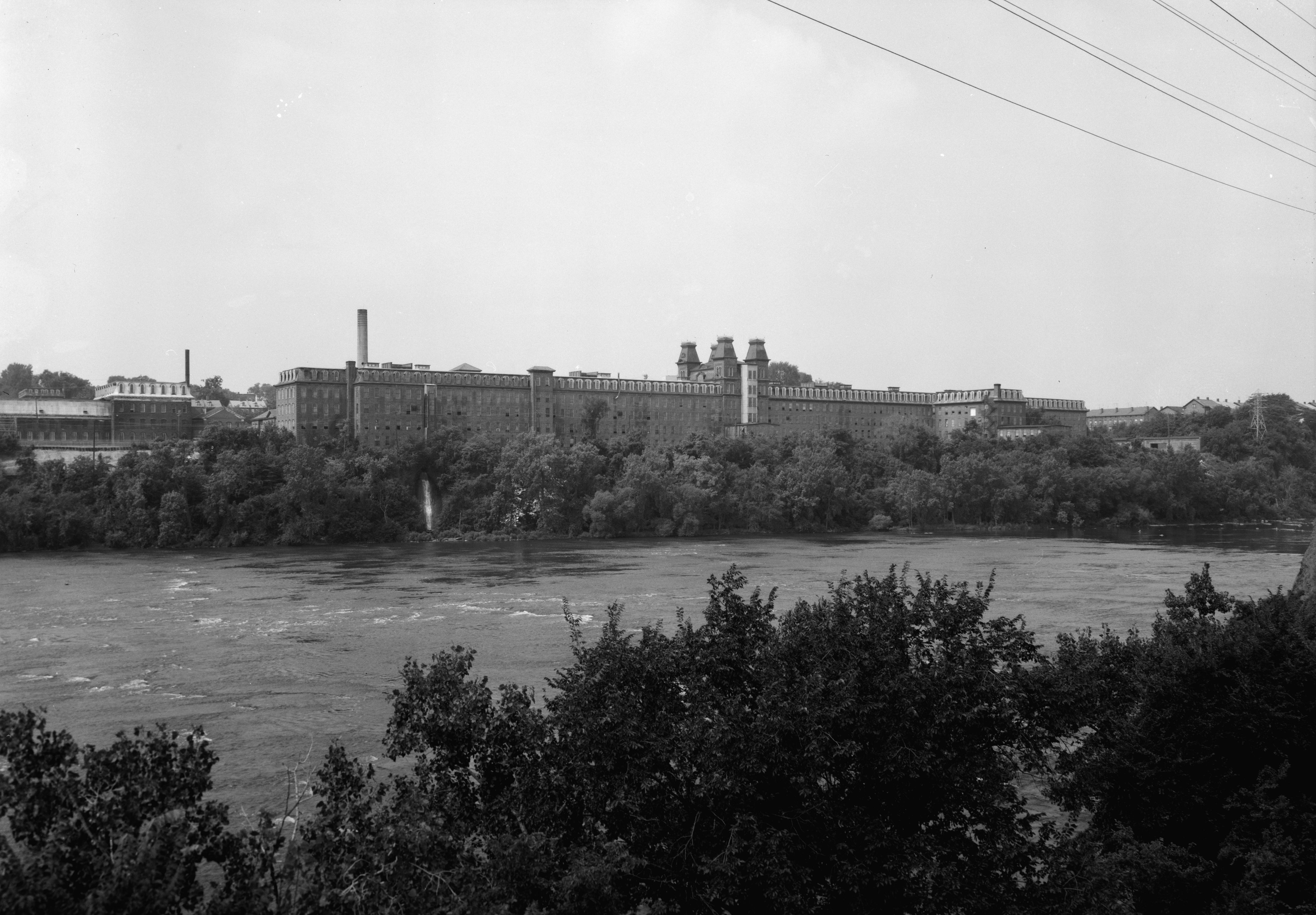
Viewed across Mohawk River, in HAER photo from 1969

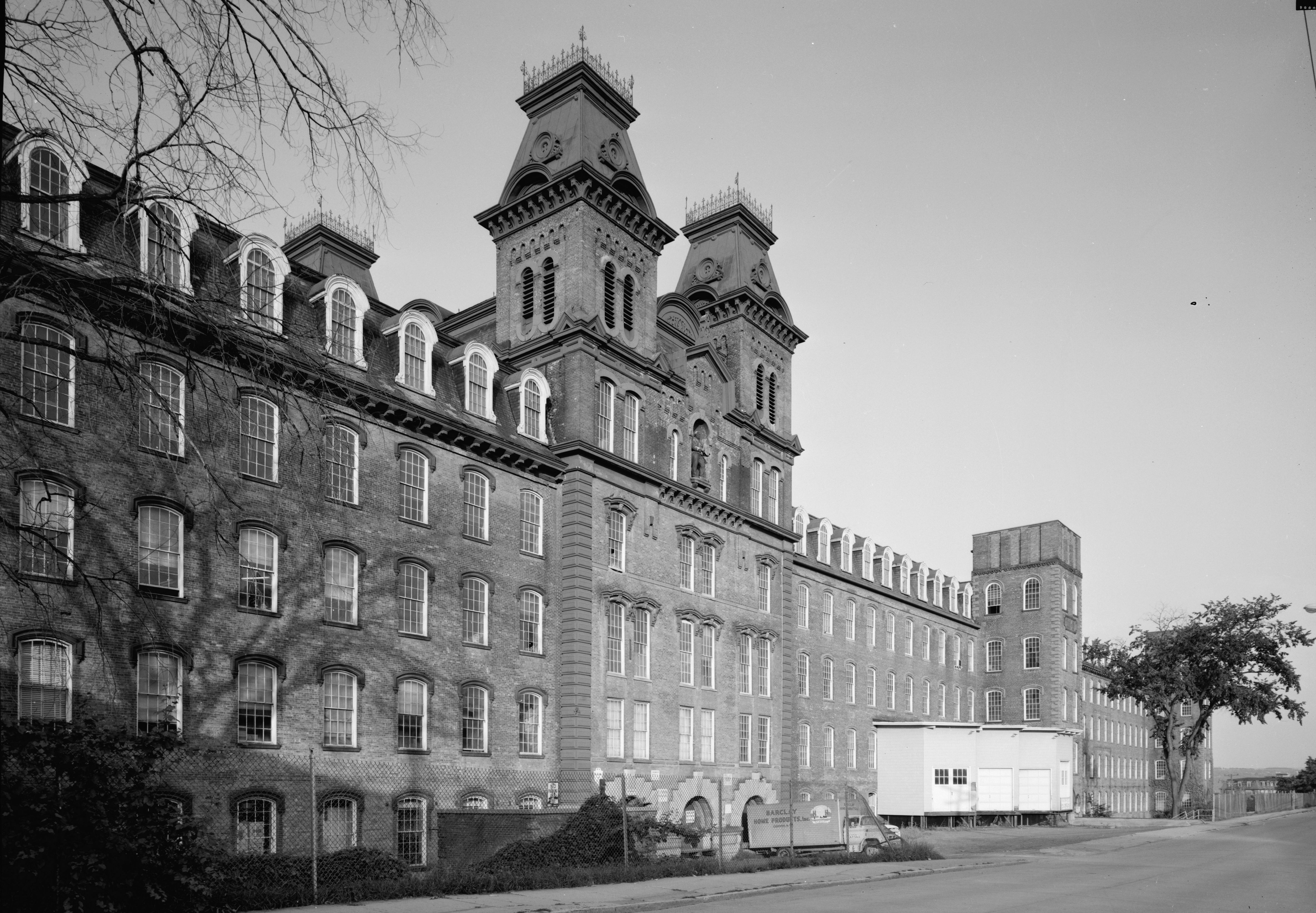
Harmony Mill No. 3, in 1969

== See also ==
- Albany Felt Company Complex, a similar residential conversion of a historic industrial property by the same developer.
- List of National Historic Landmarks in New York
- National Register of Historic Places listings in Albany County, New York
