= AIYF =

AIYF may refer to:

- Aberdeen International Youth Festival
- All India Youth Federation
