= Companies listed on the New York Stock Exchange (A) =

== A ==
Stock name	Symbol	Country of origin
A. O. Smith	AOS	US
A10 Networks	ATEN	US
AAR Corp	AIR	US
ABB Group	ABB	Switzerland
Abbott Laboratories	ABT	US
AbbVie	ABBV	US
Abercrombie & Fitch	ANF	US
ABM Industries	ABM	US
Acadia Realty Trust	AKR	US
Accenture	ACN	Ireland
ACCO Brands	ACCO	US
Acushnet Company	GOLF	US
Acuity Brands	AYI	US
Adecoagro S.A.	AGRO	Argentina
Adeptus Health	ADPT	US
Adient	ADNT	Ireland
Advance Auto Parts	AAP	US
Advanced Drainage Systems	WMS	US
ASE Technology Holding	ASX	Taiwan
AdvanSix	ASIX	US
AECOM	ACM	US
Aegon	AEG	Netherlands
AerCap	AER	Ireland
Aerohive Networks	HIVE	US
AES Corporation	AES	US
Affiliated Managers Group	AMG	US
Aflac	AFL	US
AGCO	AGCO	US
Agilent Technologies	A	US
Agnico Eagle Mines Limited	AEM	Canada
Agree Realty Corporation	ADC	US
Agrium	AGU	Canada
A. H. Belo	AHC	US
Air Lease Corporation	AL	US
Air Products and Chemicals	APD	US
Aircastle	AYR	US
Alamo Group	ALG	US
Alamos Gold	AGI	US
Alaska Air Group	ALK	US
Albany International	AIN	US
Albemarle Corporation	ALB	US
Alcoa	AA	US
Alexander's	ALX	US
Alexandria Real Estate Equities	ARE	US
Algonquin Power & Utilities	AQN	Canada
Alibaba Group	BABA	China
Allegheny Technologies	ATI	US
Allegion	ALLE	Ireland
AllianceBernstein	AB	US
Alliant Energy	LNT	US
Allison Transmission	ALSN	US
Allstate	ALL	US
Ally Financial	ALLY	US
Altria	MO	US
AmBev	ABEV	Brazil
AMC Theatres	AMC	US
Ameren	AEE	US
Ameresco	AMRC	US
American Assets Trust	AAT	US
American Eagle Outfitters	AEO	US
American Electric Power	AEP	US
American Express	AXP	US
American Financial Group	AFG	US
American Homes 4 Rent	AMH	US
American International Group	AIG	US
American Realty Investors	ARL	US
American States Water	AWR	US
American Tower	AMT	US
American Vanguard Corporation	AVD	US
American Water Works	AWK	US
Ameriprise Financial	AMP	US
Ametek	AME	US
AMN Healthcare Services	AMN	US
Ampco Pittsburgh	AP	US
Amphenol	APH	US
Amrep Corporation	AXR	US
América Móvil	AMX	Mexico
AngloGold Ashanti	AU	South Africa
Anheuser-Busch InBev	BUD	Belgium
Annaly Capital Management	NLY	US
Antero Resources	AR	US
Antero Midstream	AM	US
Aon Corporation	AON	United Kingdom
APA Corporation	APA	US
Aimco	AIV	US
Apollo Global Management	APO	US
Apple Hospitality REIT	APLE	US
Applied Industrial Technologies	AIT	US
AptarGroup	ATR	US
AquaBounty Technologies	AQB	US
Aramark	ARMK	US
Arbor Realty Trust	ABR	US
ARC Document Solutions	ARC	US
Arc Logistics Partners	ARCX	US
ArcelorMittal	MT	Luxembourg
Arch Capital Group	ARH.PRC	Bermuda
Arch Coal	ARCH	US
Archer Daniels Midland	ADM	US
Archrock	AROC	US
Arcos Dorados Holdings	ARCO	Uruguay
Ardmore Shipping	ASC	US
Ares Commercial Real Estate	ACRE	US
Ares Management	ARES	US
Argan	AGX	US
Arista Networks	ANET	US
Armour Residential REIT	ARR	US
Armstrong World Industries	AWI	US
Arrow Electronics	ARW	US
Arthur J. Gallagher & Co.	AJG	US
Artisan Partners	APAM	US
ASA Gold and Precious Metals	ASA	Bermuda
Asbury Automotive Group	ABG	US
Ashford Hospitality Trust	AHT	US
Ashland Inc.	ASH	US
Aspen Aerogels	ASPN	US
Associated Banc-Corp	ASB	US
Assurant	AIZ	US
Assured Guaranty	AGO	Bermuda
AstraZeneca	AZN	United Kingdom
AT&T	T	US
Atkore	ATKR	US
Atlantic Power Corporation	AT	Canada
Atmos Energy	ATO	US
AU Optronics	AUO	Taiwan
Autoliv	ALV	US
AutoNation	AN	US
AutoZone	AZO	US
Avery Dennison	AVY	US
Avianca Holdings	AVH	Panama
Avista	AVA	US
Avnet	AVT	US
Avon Products	AVP	United Kingdom
Axalta Coating Systems	AXTA	US
Axis Capital Holdings	AXS	Bermuda
AZZ	AZZ	US
