= Appleton Wire Works =

- U.S. National Register of Historic Places
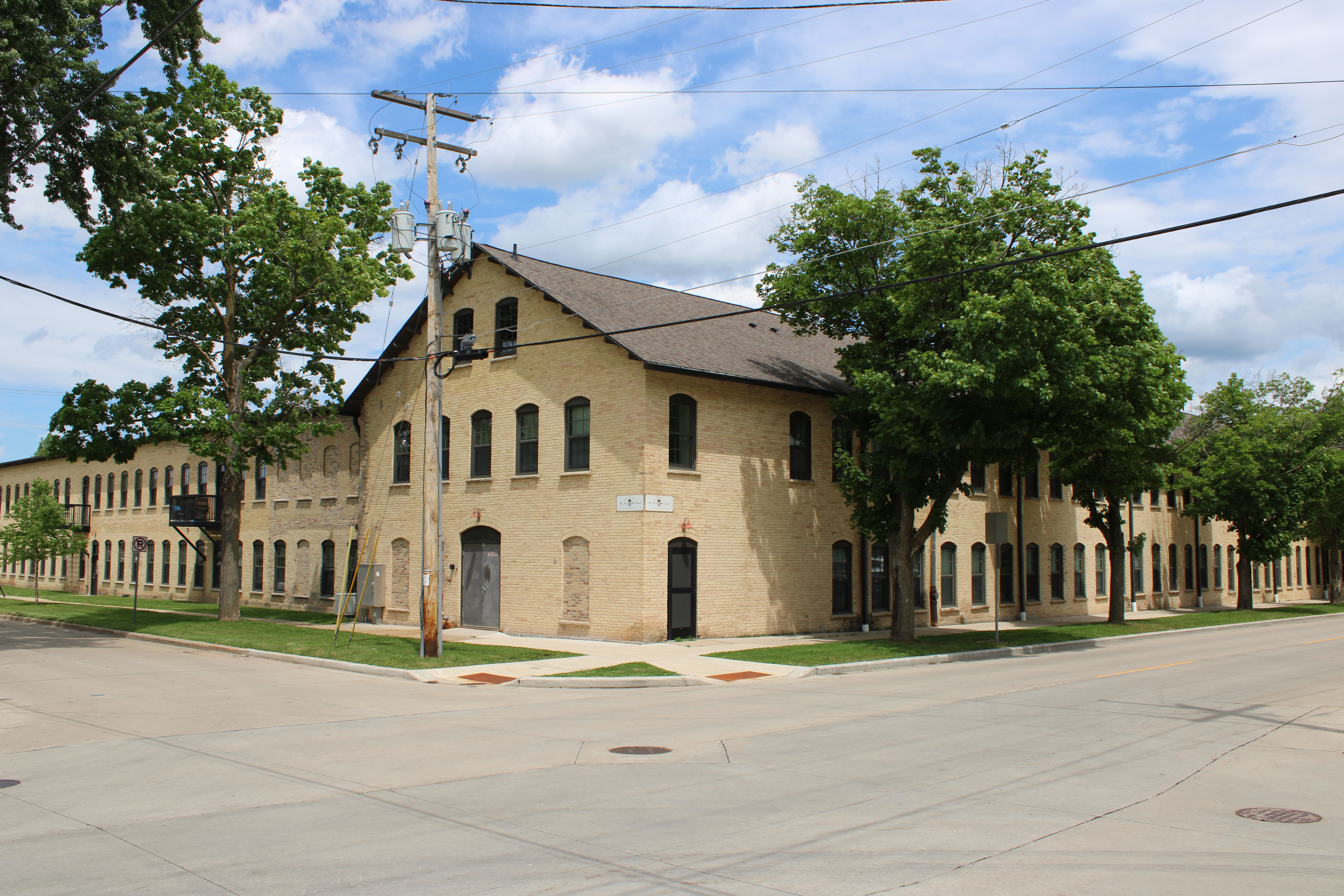
- Appleton Wire Works
- Location: 600 E. Atlantic St. Appleton, Wisconsin
- Built: 1896
- NRHP reference No.: 82005123
- Added to NRHP: September 4, 2008

Appleton Wire Works was a paper manufacturing facility in Appleton, Wisconsin, United States. It was the first wire cloth company in the Midwest, founded by William Buchanan, Gustavas E. Buchanan, and Albert Weissenborn in 1895. The plant manufactured machine wire and wire cloths used in paper and pulp mills.

It was added to the National Register of Historic Places in 2008 for its industrial significance. The company was the largest wire-weaving company in the United States before it was sold in 1968. The building now houses an apartment complex.
