= Lock 18, Erie Canal =

Lock 18, Erie Canal may refer to:

- Lock 18 of the Erie Canal
- Lock 18 of Enlarged Erie Canal
