= Enlarged Erie Canal Historic District =

Historic district in New York, United States

- U.S. National Register of Historic Places
- U.S. Historic district
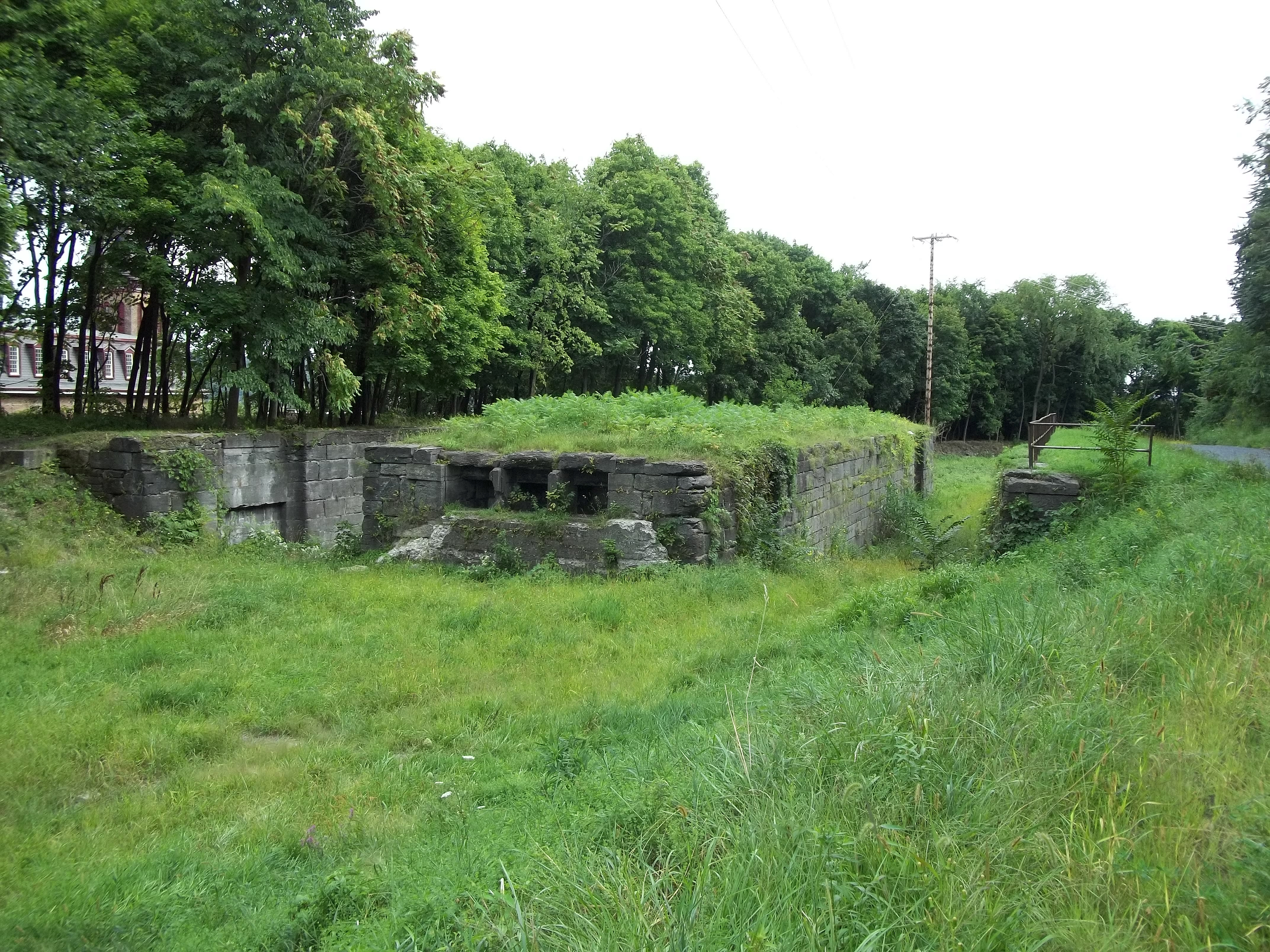
- Lock 15

- Location within New York Location within the United States
- Location: City of Cohoes, roughly from S to NW city boundary
- Coordinates: 42°46′39″N 73°42′11″W
- Area: 9.9 acres (4.0 ha)
- Built: 1836
- Architect: Merriam, Carr & Co.; Barker and Smith
- NRHP reference No.: 04000434
- Added to NRHP: May 14, 2004

Enlarged Erie Canal Historic District is a discontiguous national historic district located in the City of Cohoes in Albany County, New York. It includes two contributing buildings and 10 contributing structures. It encompasses resources associated with the Enlarged Erie Canal, 1835–1862, Locks 9 through 18. The district includes five numbered units with each unit representing a cohesive grouping of resources highlighted by one or more extant canal locks. Each unit consists of at least one remaining lock and the associated elements including sections of towpath, berm walls, engineering features, and canal prism.

- Unit 1: Lock 9
- Unit 2: Lock 10
- Unit 3: Locks 14 and 15
- Unit 4: Lock 17
- Unit 5: Lock 18

It was listed on the National Register of Historic Places in 2004.

== Gallery ==
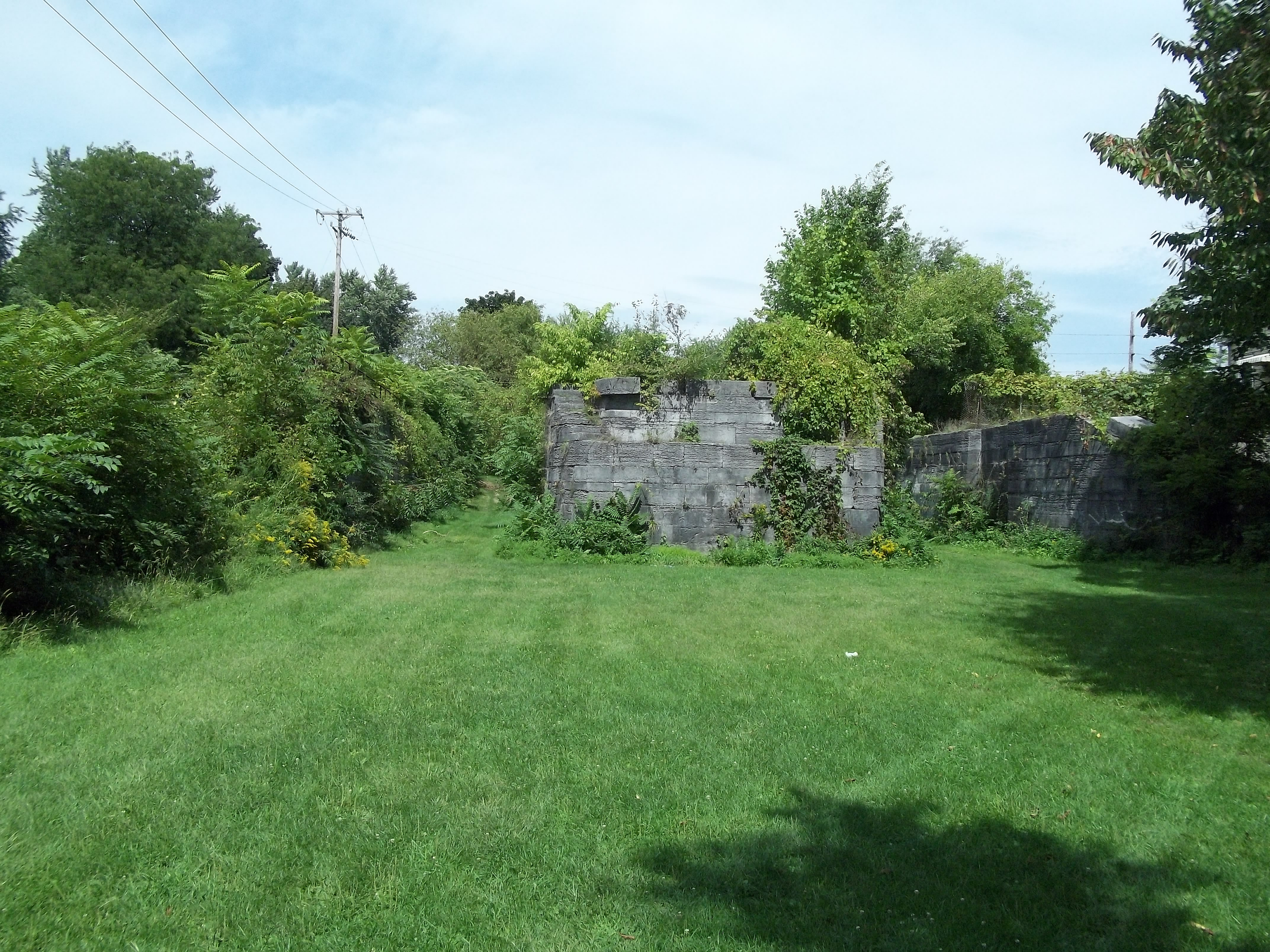
Lock 9

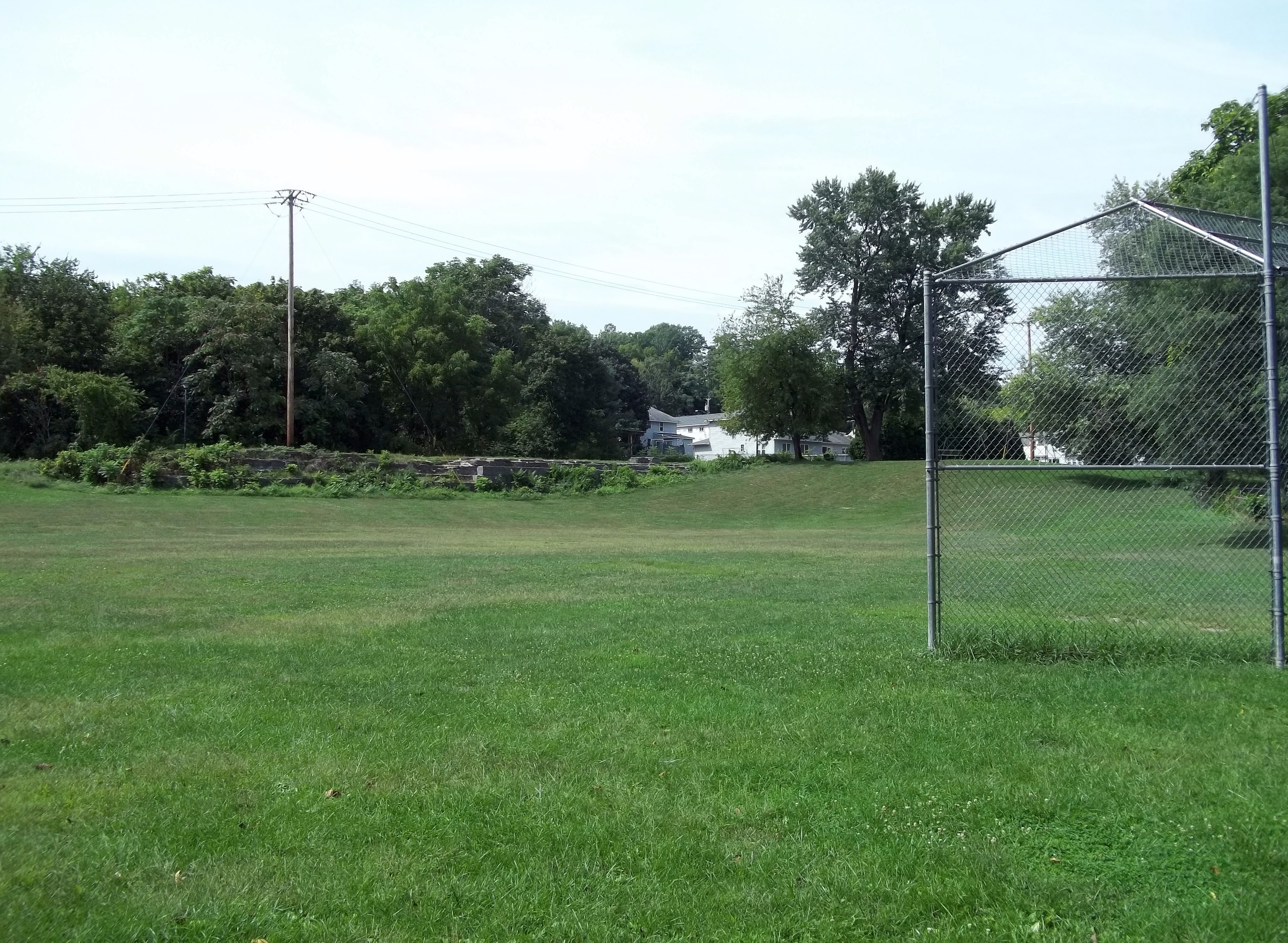
Lock 10

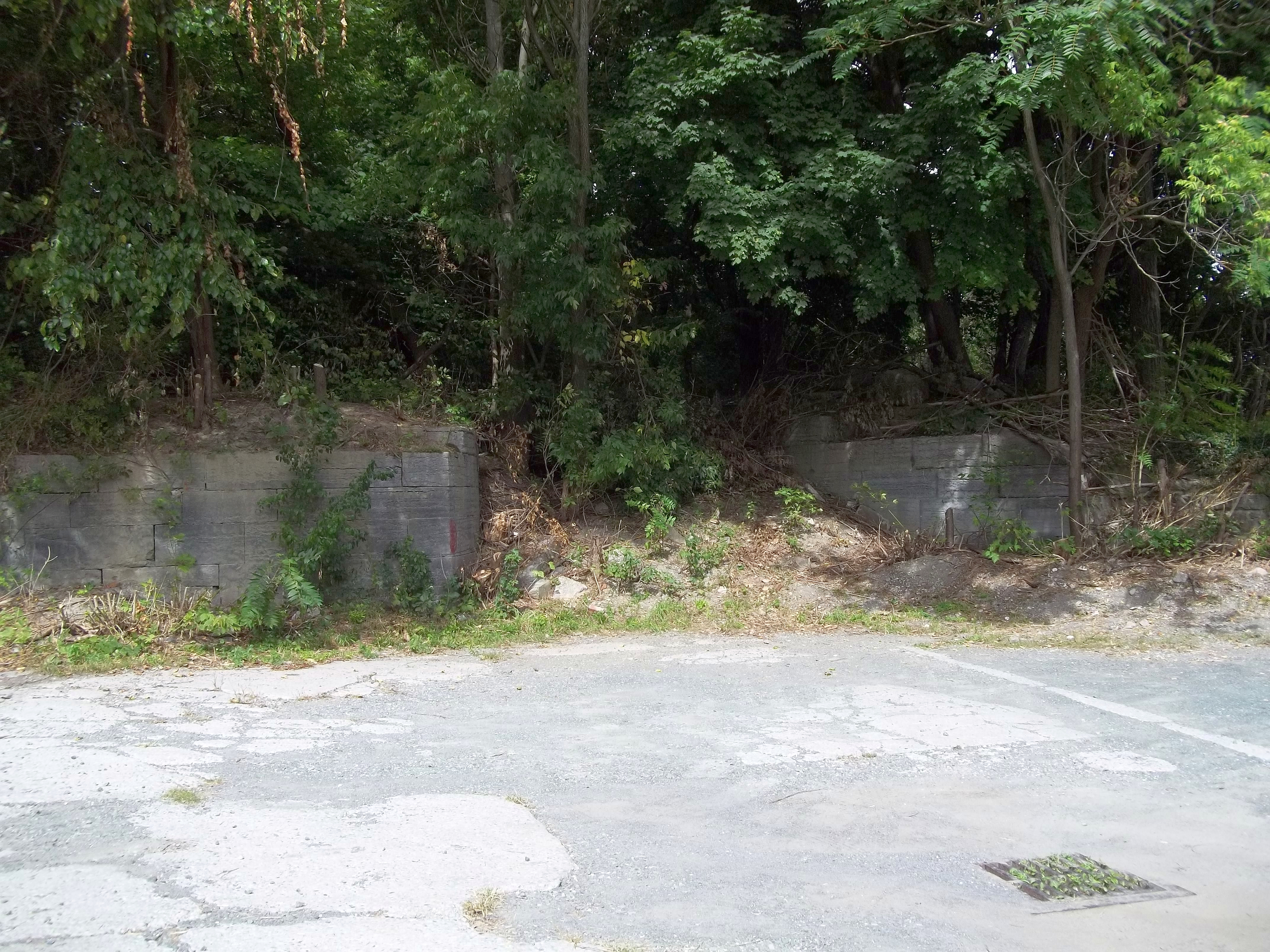
Lock 14

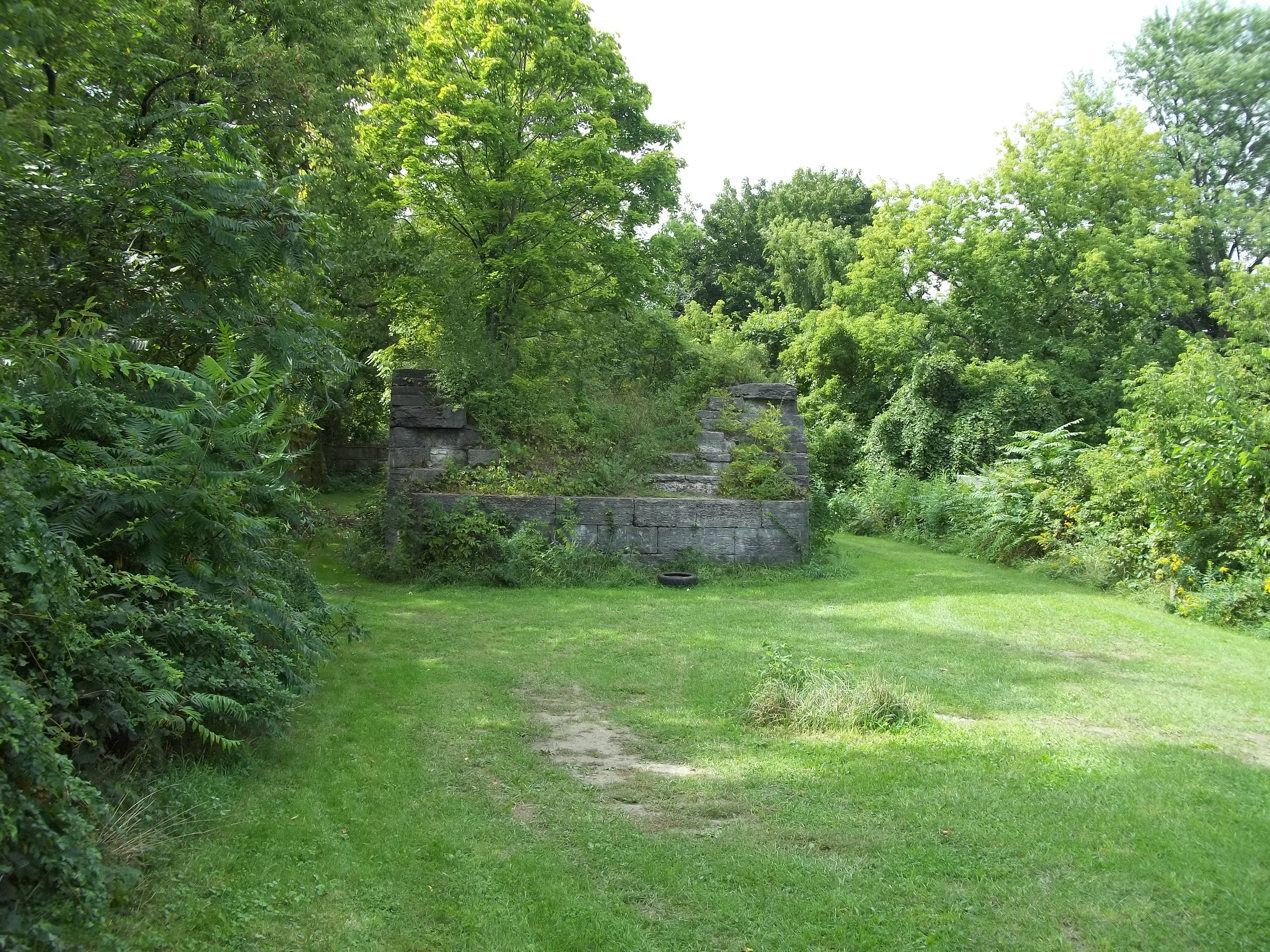
Lock 17

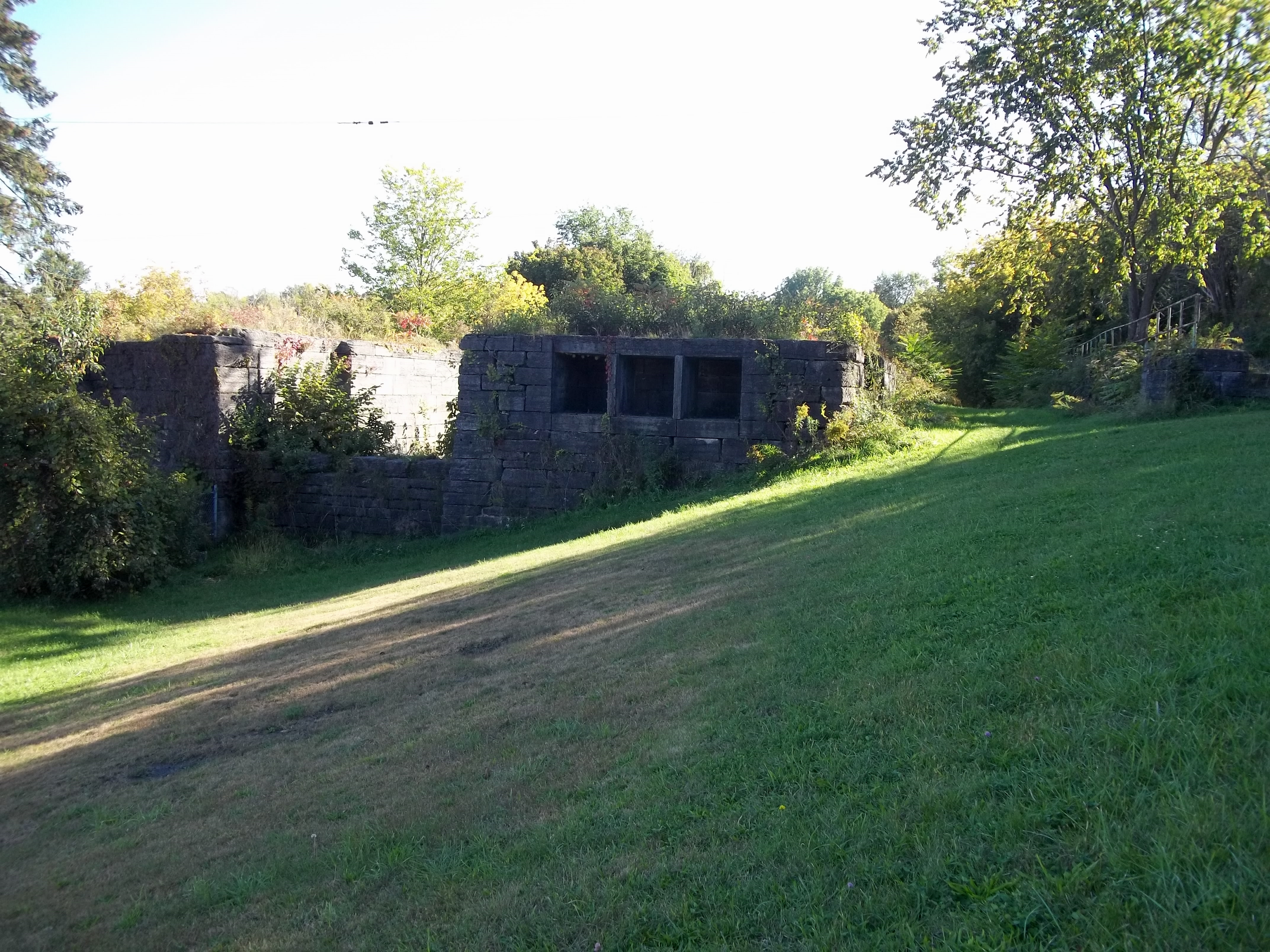
Lock 18
