= Lock 18 of Enlarged Erie Canal =

- U.S. National Register of Historic Places
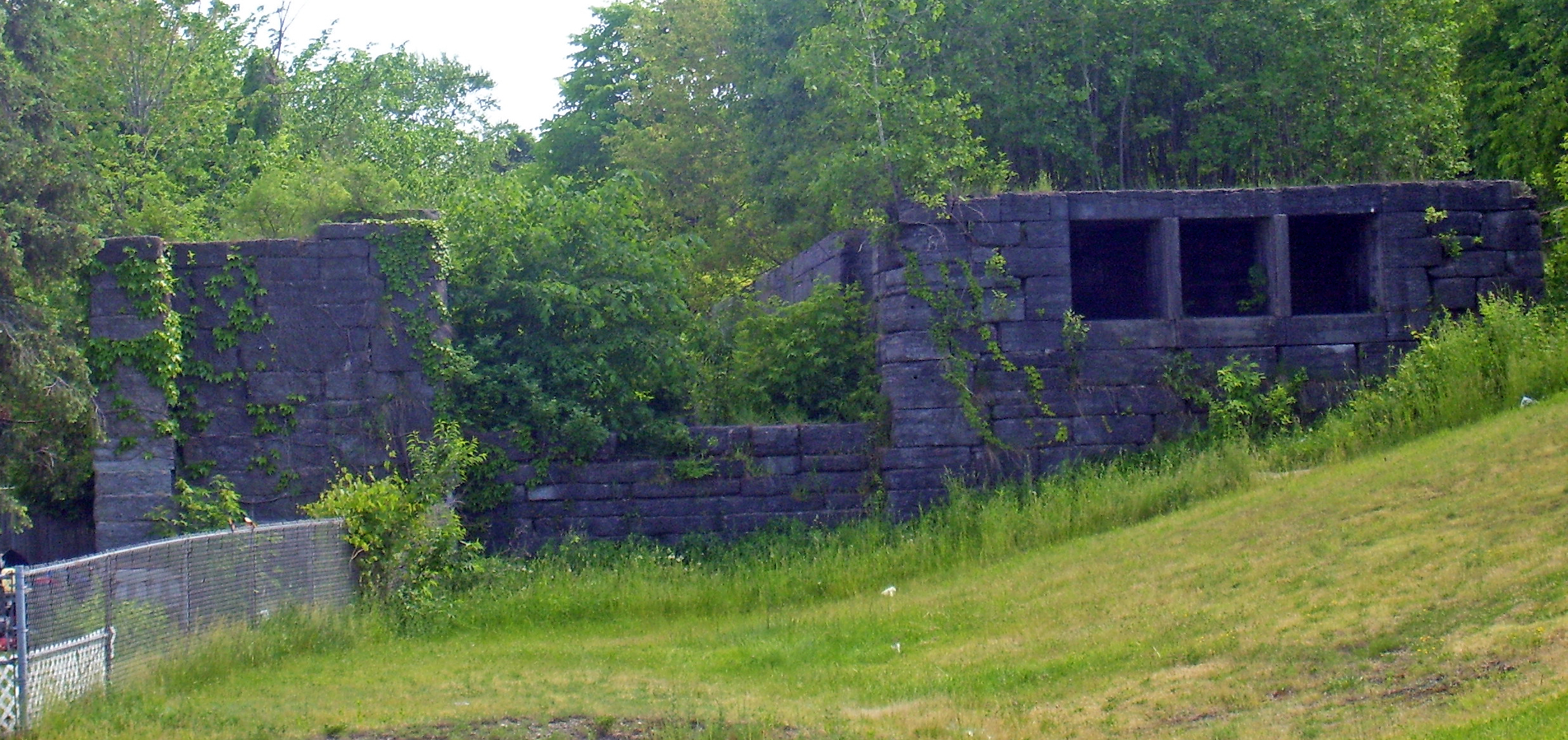
- West end of lock, 2008
- Location: Cohoes, NY
- Coordinates: 42°47′05″N 73°42′41″W
- Built: 1837-1842
- Architect: Holmes Hutchinson
- NRHP reference No.: 71000526
- Added to NRHP: 1971

Lock 18 of the Enlarged Erie Canal is located off North Mohawk Street in Cohoes, New York, United States. It is made of stone blocks 3 by 2 by 1.5 feet (90 by 50 by 40 cm) in size, roughly 150 feet (46 m) in length, laid in a random ashlar pattern. The lock's wooden gates are no longer extant.

The lock was built as part of an 1837-1842 plan to make the canal bed larger, heading off competition from railroads, and allowing a detour around the section of canal between Albany and Schenectady to the south, which had fewer locks and was difficult to navigate. Holmes Hutchinson, a canal engineer who later became chief of that department and a director of several railroads, surveyed the route and drew up the plans for all locks in the mid-1830s. The canal was relocated slightly within the city of Cohoes; North Mohawk Street today parallels the original alignment, with sections of the original canal kept open to provide water power to nearby mill complexes along the Mohawk River.

Ten of the locks from the Enlarged Erie Canal remain within Cohoes. Lock 18 was individually listed on the National Register of Historic Places, added in 1970 in recognition of the high quality of its remaining stonework; the remainder of the locks on city-owned land were added to the National Register in 2004 as a non-contiguous historic district. A city-owned trail along the former towpath allows visitors to see them. There is also a small parking lot along the street northeast of the lock with an interpretive sign.
