= Samuel Dickson (American politician) =

American politician

Member of the U.S. House of Representatives from New York's 14th district
- In office March 4, 1855 – March 3, 1857
- Preceded by: Rufus Peckham
- Succeeded by: Erastus Corning

Personal details
- Born: March 29, 1807 Bethlehem, New York, US
- Died: May 3, 1858 (aged 51) New Scotland, New York, US
- Resting place: New Scotland Cemetery
- Party: Whig
- Education: Union College

Samuel Dickson (March 29, 1807 – May 3, 1858) was a United States representative from New York.

== Biography ==
Samuel Dickson was born on March 29, 1807, in the portion of Bethlehem, New York, later incorporated as the town of New Scotland. He completed preparatory studies and graduated from Union College in 1825.

Dickson studied medicine, received a diploma from the Censors of the Medical Society of the State of New York in May 1829, and practiced in New Scotland.

Opposed to slavery and motivated to repeal the Kansas–Nebraska Act, Dickson was elected as a Whig candidate to the Thirty-fourth Congress, holding office from March 4, 1855, to March 3, 1857. He did not seek reelection in 1856 and returned to his New Scotland medical practice.

Dickson died from the lingering effects of an accident. Near the end of his first session in Congress, Dickson stood up from the chair where he was sitting to consult a book. He did not notice that the chair overturned, and when he attempted to resume his seat, Dickson fell heavily onto the floor. The concussion to his spine resulted in gradual paralysis, and within a few months he lost the use of his lower limbs.

Dickson's health continued to decline as a result of the fall. He died in New Scotland on May 3, 1858. He was buried in New Scotland's Presbyterian Church Cemetery.

U.S. House of Representatives
| Preceded by Rufus W. Peckham | Member of the U.S. House of Representatives from New York's 14th congressional district March 4, 1855 – March 3, 1857 | Succeeded by Erastus Corning |
