= Mordecai Bauman =

American opera singer (1912–2007)

- Mordecai Bauman, in the 1930s
- Born: March 12, 1912; Bronx, New York City, United States
- Died: May 16, 2007 (aged 95); Manhattan, New York City, U.S.
- Occupations: Baritone; actor; academic teacher; music administrator

Mordecai Hirsch Bauman (March 12, 1912 – May 16, 2007) was an American baritone, actor, director, voice teacher, conductor, and fine arts administrator. A native of The Bronx, Bauman was educated at the Juilliard School, Columbia University, and Case Western University. He had an active performance career in operas, musicals, plays, and concerts from the early 1930s into the 1960s. He performed on Broadway and made recordings of both operas and art songs. He was closely associated with the music of Charles Ives, and was known for his performances of music by living American composers on the concert stage. In the 1930s and 1940s he performed frequently at events associated with far-left organizations, such as the Communist Party USA.

After serving in the United States Army during World War II, he taught on the music faculties of Biarritz American University in France (1945–1946), and the Cleveland Institute of Music (1946–1951), serving as the director of the opera program at the latter institution. He was also active as a concert organizer and conductor in Cleveland. From 1952 to 1975 he was director of the Indian Hill Music Workshop (IHMW), a nationally known summer music camp held at the Oronoque estate in Stockbridge, Massachusetts. He also taught on the music faculty of Brooklyn College, and was a cantor at Temple Anshe Amunim in Pittsfield, Massachusetts in the period that he worked for the IHMW. In the 1960s he was the educational director for the Jewish Community Centers of Essex County, New Jersey, and from 1969 through 1972 he was managing director of Newark Symphony Hall. In his later life he taught courses part time at Cornell University and Hampshire College. Jazz musician Chuck Israels is his stepson.

== Early life and education ==
The son of American Jews Allen and Minnie Bauman, Mordecai Hirsch Bauman was born on March 2, 1912, in the Bronx, New York City. He graduated from James Monroe High School, and then studied at Columbia College where earned a Bachelor of Arts in 1935. He also held a fellowship at the Juilliard Graduate School of Music, studying at Juilliard from 1930 to 1934 while a Columbia student. He studied voice with Francis Rogers, and graduated from Juilliard in 1934 where he trained as a classical singer.

In December 1932 Bauman starred as Arsamene in Juilliard's production of Handel's Serse in what was credited as the first performance of that opera in New York City. It was conducted by Albert Stoessel. He starred in more operas at Juilliard conducted by Stoessel, including portraying Betto in Puccini's Gianni Schicchi (1933), the title role in Mozart's The Marriage of Figaro (1933) with George Britton as the Count and Apolyna Stoskus as the Countess, and the role of Menelaos in the world premiere of George Antheil's opera Helen Retires in 1934 with members of the Oratorio Society of New York serving as the opera chorus.

Bauman later earned a Master of Arts from Case Western Reserve University, studying there while teaching classical singing at the Cleveland Institute of Music. He married his first wife Alice Garlen on June 12, 1937, in Glens Falls, New York. Their marriage ended in divorce on April 26, 1944. He married his second wife Irma Israels (née Commanday) later that same year.

== Career ==
=== Opera and other theatre performances ===
Bauman made his Broadway debut at the 44th Street Theatre as the Butcher in Louis Gruenberg and John Erskine's fairy opera Jack and the Beanstalk. He returned to Broadway in the 1934–1935 production of Seán O'Casey's Within the Gates at the National Theatre, in which he was featured singing a Salvation Army hymn. In the summer of 1937 he starred in the satiric revue Fare, Please which was given in Warrensburg, New York, by the Green Mansion Playhouse Group, an organization for which he was also artistic director since 1935.

In 1941 Bauman created the role of the Narrator in the world premiere of Britten's and Auden's opera Paul Bunyan at Columbia University. In the chorus of this opera was his future second wife Irma whom he met while doing this show. More than 50 years later the couple served as opera coaches for this work when it was staged at the University of Toronto in 1998.

Bauman starred in the 1942 patriotic Broadway musical revue Let Freedom Sing at the Longacre Theatre in which he sang the song "The House I Live In" by Earl Robinson and Lewis Allan. He appeared Off-Broadway at the Barbizon-Plaza Theatre in Tidbits of 1946 but was no longer with the show when it reached Broadway's Plymouth Theatre. In 1954 he returned to Broadway as Henderson in Earl Robinson and Waldo Salt's musical Sandhog at the Phoenix Theatre.

=== New York concert singer, recording artist, and stage performer ===
Bauman won the gold medal in the New York Music Week Association contest which led to his concert debut with Philharmonic Symphony Society led by Hans Lange in March 1931. In 1932 he gave a recital on WOR radio, and the following year performed in a series of radio programs with violinist Elias Breeskin. In reviewing one of the latter programs, Ben Gross of the New York Daily News praised the beauty of his lyric baritone voice, but felt that his performance of "I've Got a Little List" from Gilbert and Sullivan's The Mikado lacked comic interpretation causing the number to fall flat. In March 1935 he was a soloist in Jacob Schaefer's oratorio Oktober at the Brooklyn Academy of Music.

In early December 1935 Bauman performed in a concert of new music by American composers given at The Town Hall that was organized by Leonard Liebling in which he performed Elie Siegmeister's The Strange Funeral in Braddock. He recorded this art song in 1936 for Music Quarterly Recordings. The reviewer in Gramophone described the work as an "ominous" and disturbing work about the death of a Czech worker entombed in molten steel in a Pennsylvania mill.

In late December 1935 Bauman was Aaron Copland's assisting performer for a lecture-recital Copland gave at The Town Hall entitled "The Composer and the Audience" that was sponsored by Henry Cowell's New Music Society. Bauman performed two songs by Charles Ives to accompany Copland's lecture, including the song "Charlie Rutledge". Bauman later recorded this song with pianist Albert Hirsh along with five more Ives songs ("Evening", "Resolution", "Ann Street", "Two Little Flowers", and "The Greatest Man") for the 1938 album Ives: Six Songs released on a 78 rpm disc by New Music Quarterly Recordings. It was later re-released on the Composers Recordings, Inc. label. He later performed this set of six songs in a recital he gave at The Town Hall in 1939 with pianist Milton Kaye, and again with Kaye as part of the New Friends of Music concert series in New York in 1940.

With harpsichordist Ernst Victor Wolff, Bauman recorded several songs by Thomas Arne with lyrics by William Shakespeare which were released by Columbia Records (CR) in 1940. In December 1940 he performed excerpts from Milhaud's Christophe Colomb at a concert honoring the composer held at the Museum of Modern Art under the auspices of the League of Composers. In 1946 he performed music by Douglas Moore at a festival of American music held in Saratoga Springs, New York.

Under the name Mordy Bauman he recorded the albums Song of George M. Cohan (1942, with Ray Bloch and his orchestra for CR), Songs of American Sailormen (1946, Musicraft Records), and the children's album The Three Bears (1947, Musicraft) which used music by Hecky Krasno.

=== Activist-singer ===
During the 1930s Bauman became active in the far left wing political movement within the United States. In 1935 he appeared with composer Hanns Eisler at a concert for children sponsored by the American League Against War and Fascism in which he sang with Children's Symphony Orchestra at Abromson-Slutsky Hall in Los Angeles. In May 1937 he was a soloist with a symphony orchestra organized by the International Workers Order that was conducted by Irving R. Korenman that included not only repertoire by classical composer like Mikhail Glinka and Felix Mendelssohn but also songs associated with the communist party. The following November he performed with Lan Adomián at Carnegie Hall for an event celebrating the anniversary of the Soviet Union that featured Soviet Ambassador to the United States Alexander Troyanovsky as the guest of honor. He performed for an event organized by the Communist Party USA at Madison Square Garden in 1939.

Bauman made several recordings supporting leftist causes with the Timely Recording Company (TRC) label in the 1930s, including 1936 recordings of Bertolt Brecht and Eisler's songs "In Praise of Learning" and "Forward, We've Not Forgotten" from the play The Mother which were made with pianist Marc Blitzstein and the New-Singers Chorus. With TRC he recorded a 1937 album of strike songs with the Manhattan Chorus, with musical numbers including "Sit Down", "Casey Jones", "On the Picket Line", "We Shall Not Be Moved", "Hold the Fort", and "Solidarity Forever". In 1947 he gave a concert sponsored by the American Soviet Music Society at Times Hall. In 1949 he gave a concert in Chicago sponsored by the People's Artists Inc.

=== War service, Cleveland Institute of Music, and musician in Cleveland ===
During World War II, Bauman served in the United States Army from September 1, 1943, through December 7, 1945. For the army he worked as a program director for the United Service Organizations. After this he taught on the music faculty at Biarritz American University in France in 1945–1946, an institution which offered classes to U.S. service personnel.

In the fall of 1946 Bauman joined the voice faculty of the Cleveland Institute of Music (CIM) where he taught for five years. On October 30, 1946, January 7, 1948, November 24, 1948, and April 19, 1950, he gave faculty recitals at the CIM. By 1949 he was the director of the CIM's opera program, and also taught concurrently as a part-time member of the music faculty at the Pennsylvania College for Women in Pittsburgh. One of his students at the CIM was tenor and composer Howard Alfred Roberts.

While teaching at the CIM he continued to perform. On December 11, 1947, he performed the world premiere of Gardner Read's Three Songs for baritone and piano in Cleveland. In 1948 he gave a recital at the University of Illinois Urbana-Champaign. In 1949 he directed a television adaption of La traviata starring Laurel Hurley as Violetta that was filmed for the American Broadcasting Company. With soprano Frances Greer and conductor George Schick he recorded the opera Il maestro di musica (sung in English as The Music Master), a pastiche opera by multiple composers often misattributed to Giovanni Battista Pergolesi (although it has some music by him), which was released in 1950.

In the late 1940s Bauman managed a music concert series housed at Cleveland's Severance Hall which brought outside artists like jazz musician Louis Armstrong (November 1947) as well as local talent such as violinist Sidney Harth (December 1947) to the stage. A January 1948 concert in this series featured an all-Marc Blitzstein program with the composer participating that featured singer Muriel Smith and Bauman performing. The series concluded with a concert featuring Pete Seeger in March 1948 which had clear leftist political overtone which drew some criticism in the local press.

In the early 1950s Bauman conducted the Jewish Folk Chorus in Cleveland. He directed a professional production of Joseph Haydn's opera Lo speziale (sung in English as The Apothecary) in Cleveland in 1950 with a cast that later recorded the opera for Allegre Records. He recorded the title role in Mozart's The Impressario (1950) for Mercury Records.

=== Indian Hill and later career ===
In January 1952 Mrs. Basil Greenblatt purchased the Oronoque estate in Stockbridge, Massachusetts, with the intent of establishing a summer music camp on the property known as Indian Hill with Bauman as its appointed director. Bauman left the CIM and relocated to Yonkers, New York, around this time. The first Indian Hill Music Workshop (IHWH) was held in the summer of 1952 which included a student production of Purcell's Dido and Aeneas conducted by Seymour Lipkin. Bauman's second wife Irma also played an instrumental role in establishing the IHWH. The IHWH continued to operate as a summer school for the arts for high school students until 1975 when the Bauman's decided they could no longer continue to operate the program. The property was sold to Brooklyn College where Bauman was at that time a member of the music faculty. One of the IHWH's alumni was Arlo Guthrie.

Bauman continued to perform while working as the director of the IHWH. In 1952 he was a soloist with the Westchester Chamber Orchestra Society. In December 1953 he was the narrator for one of the New York Philharmonic's Young People's Concerts. In 1958 he was appointed cantor of Temple Anshe Amunim in Pittsfield, Massachusetts. He was a soloist with the Norwalk Symphony Orchestra in 1959 in a concert celebrating the 85th birthday of Charles Ives. In the 1960s he was the educational director for Essex County, New Jersey Jewish Community Centers for nine years, and taught the course "American Contemporary Culture" at Cornell University. In 1969 he was appointed managing director of Newark Symphony Hall, a position he remained in through 1972. In the 1970s he was an adjunct faculty member at Hampshire College.

During the Bach Tercentenary in 1985, he led a tour to the Bach Festival in Leipzig. A few years later, he completed a documentary, The Stations of Bach, in East Germany. The documentary was funded by the National Endowments for the Arts and Humanities and broadcast nationally on PBS in 1990. CUNY TV now owns the documentary and broadcasts it annually on Bach's birthday, March 21.

== Death ==
In 2006, Mordecai and Irma published their memoir, titled From our Angle of Repose. He died on May 16, 2007, in Manhattan at the age of 95. He had two sons, Joshua and Marc, with his second wife Irma. His stepson is the jazz musician Chuck Israels (Irma's son from her first marriage).
