= Coeymans Creek =

Coeymans Creek Onesquethaw Creek, Oniskethau Kil
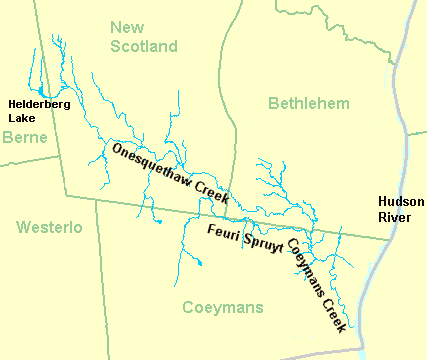
- Onesquethaw and Coeymans Creeks
- Native name: O-nis-ke-thau

Location
- Country: United States
- State: New York
- County: Albany
- Towns: Bethlehem, Coeymans

Physical characteristics
- Source
  - location: Bethlehem, New York
  - coordinates: 42°32′19″N 73°49′40″W
- Mouth: Hudson River
  - location: Coeymans, New York
  - coordinates: 42°28′34″N 73°47′23″W
  - elevation: 0 ft (0 m)

Coeymans Creek is a 7.3-mile-long (11.7 km) tributary of the Hudson River in Albany County, New York in the United States.

The creek originates as the continuation of Onesquethaw Creek, which starts near Clarksville, in the Helderberg Mountains.

== History ==
O-nis'-ke-thau Creek is also called Coeymans Creek. There was a hamlet of this name in New Scotland as well as Oniskethau flats and mountain. It is said to have been an early Native American name meaning cornfields.

== Tributaries ==
- Mosher Brook
- Onesquethaw Creek
- Feuri Spruyt (Feuri-Sprayt Kill), a small stream in the north part of Coeymans, disappears, and flows for half a mile in a subterranean passage, coming to the surface again in New Scotland.

== See also ==
- List of rivers of New York
- Onesquethaw Valley Historic District
