= Gertrude Ehrlich =

Austrian-American mathematician (1923–2025)

Gertrude Ehrlich (January 7, 1923 – October 18, 2025) was an Austrian-American mathematician, who specialized in abstract algebra and algebraic number theory. She was a professor emerita of mathematics at the University of Maryland, College Park.

== Background ==
Ehrlich was born on January 7, 1923, in Vienna, the daughter of Jewish lawyer Josef Ehrlich and his wife Charlotte, née Kobak. In the late 1930s, she became a student at the Chajes Gymnasium, a special high school in Vienna for Jewish honor students; her classmates included future Nobel laureate Walter Kohn and mathematicians Rodolfo Permutti and Karl Greger. She was able to escape Nazi-occupied Austria in 1939, traveling with her mother, her older sister Margarete Ehrlich (a philosophy student and later radiographer) and aunt Mathilde Ehrlich (a painter) to the US on the SS Statendam in July 1939; her father rejoined them a year later. They lived for the next several years with her uncle Benedict Kobak in Atlanta. She became a US citizen in 1945.

She graduated from the Georgia State College for Women in 1943, and earned a master's degree from the University of North Carolina in 1945. She completed her Ph.D. in 1953 at the University of Tennessee. Her dissertation, The Structure of Continuous Rings, was supervised by Wallace Givens.

Ehrlich died in Baltimore, Maryland, on October 18, 2025, at the age of 102.

== Contributions ==
Ehrlich was the author of the book Fundamental Concepts of Abstract Algebra (PWS-Kent Publishing, 1991; Dover, 2011). She is the coauthor of The Structure of the Real Number System (with Leon Warren Cohen, D. Van Nostrand, 1963) and of Algebra (with Jacob Goldhaber, Macmillan, 1970; Robert E. Krieger Publishing, 1980).

In 1964 she became editor of the "Classroom Notes" department of The American Mathematical Monthly. She was the first organizer of the University of Maryland High School Mathematics Competition, held annually for high school students in Maryland and the District of Columbia, starting in 1979.

The concept of a morphic group comes from a 1976 research paper of Ehrlich, "Units and one-sided units in regular rings", in the Transactions of the American Mathematical Society, and Ehrlich's theorem on the endomorphisms of morphic groups, from the same paper, is named for her.
