= Maria Montana =

American operatic soprano

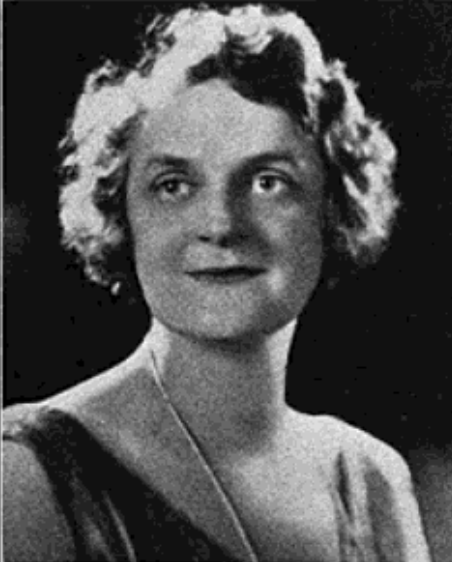
- Maria Montana, from a 1927 publication
- Born: Ruth Kellogg Waite; January 23, 1893; Wallace, Idaho, U.S.
- Died: March 16, 1971 (aged 78); San Diego, California, U.S.
- Occupation: Opera singer

Maria Montana (born Ruth Kellogg Waite; January 23, 1893 – March 16, 1971) was an American opera singer often called either a coloratura or lyric soprano who had training in the Toronto Conservatory of Music and the American Conservancy of Music in Fontainebleau, France. She performed a few years in France and Italy in the earlier 1920s where she picked up the stage name, and then began a prolonged career touring in America soon with the National Music League, the New York Philharmonic Orchestra, broadcasts on the NBC Radio Network, and other orchestras across the United States, often returning to Montana, before semi-retiring in Minneapolis, Minnesota, in 1940. By then she regularly used her stage name as her everyday name and became visible associating with the Baháʼí Faith by 1942. While occasionally performing, she also took part in various projects including meetings for the religion's teachings on the oneness of humanity, was elected as a Minnesota state delegate to the national Baháʼí convention for 1945, voted by mail, at which Helen Elsie Austin was elected as one of the nine members of the National Spiritual Assembly of the Baháʼí Faith in the United States. Shoghi Effendi, then the international head of the religion, rolled out plans including goals for the religion in Latin America and Europe. In a few years, after losing her uncle for whom she was a care-giver, and with a renewal of the plans of the international development of Baháʼí communities, she embarked on pioneering for the religion in Europe, mostly Italy, from the late 1950s. While there she sang for the opening of the German Baháʼí House of Worship. She returned to America in the mid-1960s and lived outside of San Diego, California. All along she had maintained private lessons, occasionally sang, and took part in operatic societies and events. She died in a car accident on March 16, 1971.

In the 2010s a New Mexico musical festival began offering an award in her name to some of the contestant singers.

== Early life ==
Ruth Kellogg Waite, later known as either Maria or Marie Montana at times, was born January 23, 1893, in Wallace, Idaho, to John Kellogg Waite, age 34 born in New York, and Alice May Bunyard age 18 and born in California.

More than a decade before Ruth was born, her father John/Jack was an athlete giving jumping and wrestling exhibitions, held records, and was a pugilist of some success, who praised black boxer Peter Jackson and not John L. Sullivan, whom he had once boxed and lost to, it was later said. He had also suffered badly from a fight in Salt Lake City, so the story goes, against six policemen who clubbed him to insensibility and suffered a cracked skull. He had been arrested November 1880 though there is no mention of injuries and still went on to his career boxing and athletics. Married by 1890, the couple survived an avalanche that inundated the town of Burke, Idaho. Jack joined a sheriff department in Montana and later was appointed as a deputy to US Marshall William McDermott during his term 1894 - 1898. Jack then went prospecting and partnered with later Lt. Governor Archibald E. Spriggs for a copper mine, of which they were directors. Along the way Jack joined WoodmenLife Insurance company. The 1900 US Census has Ruth second oldest child after a son Eddie born 1891, and followed by son William born 1897, and daughter Grace born 1899; the family was living in Helena, capital of Montana. Another son, also named John Kellogg Waite, was born in 1901.

At the time of Jack's death in 1902 the oldest child in the home was nine years old Ruth. Jack had been found shot in the right side of his head with a 44 Colt Revolver in his right hand still smoking. It was judged a self-inflicted wound from which he died 12 hours later. He was considered generous to a fault though he had a gambling problem both winning and losing large amounts of money through reputation vs facts of the details varied. He was also known to complain about pain in his head and had bouts of depression. That particular night he spent out all night with friends drinking; the death was also felt a temporary insanity by some of his friends. The community Benevolent and Protective Order of Elks held a funeral, and the insurance settlement was done. The family moved to Lewistown in central Montana.

Ruth Waite was related to the New England Foote family via Betsey Newton, daughter of Amasa Foote of Smyrna, New York. Betsy was Ruth's paternal grandmother who also died in 1902 as did her son, Ruth's father.

== Early performances ==
Waite developed a reputation as a singer. Her debut as a soloist was four years after the death of her father in a production of The Mikado in January 1906 when she was just turned 13 years old. In May she participated in a fundraiser for St. Mary's School of Lewistown giving the recitation, performed in a pantomime skit, and singing, at the graduation ceremony and was at that year's town July 4 celebrations. In late 1907 she sang at the Bijou Theater in Lewistown, and the following spring was in a concert supporting role followed by returning to the Bijou in May. She sang again in the fall including Kate Vannah's Goodbye sweet day.

In 1909 she won a piano in a newspaper subscription contest that ran several months for the district constituting Chicago, Milwaukee and St. Paul railroad areas. Later in 1909 she sang in concerts in September and November,

The 1910 US Census has her in the household of Alice Waite with older brother Edward living in Lewistown. Alice was unemployed but Ruth's older brother was a bookkeeper and Waite herself was listed as a telephone operator. That year she was being called the "Lewistown songbird" in various performances in Lewistown, and performed on into the beginning of 1911. She then attended a wedding followed by further community performances in the summer. After those six performances across 1910-11, in 1912 she attended a baby shower while still employed as a telephone operator. Visiting performers came that year and Waite was among those aiding one of their performances. Many of the Waite family including Ruth turned out for the town 1913 new year ball. Further local performances followed and now expanding into Great Falls with nine performances and plays. Her older brother Edward returned home from his work in China that summer.

== Musical career ==
=== The Toronto Conservatory ===
Now 20 years old, late in 1913 came the news that Waite was going to the Toronto Conservatory of Music, (later called the Royal Conservatory) and left in 1914. She was back to visit Lewistown in the summer, and joined in a community performance. Then she was back to the Conservatory. She gave a recital in Toronto the spring of 1915 accompanied by German pianist Viggo Kihl, She was back in the area in February 1916. It was said she finished her third year at the Conservatory though in fact it was just two years, and was talking about visiting her brother in China come June. She had graduated with the degree of "Licentiate of the Conservatory of Toronto of Music" (LCTM) in what was more often a four year program - and was their highest degree - and did some instructing at the Conservatory her last year there. She had to pass subjects in piano, harmony, counterpoint, history and rudiments of music, senior sight singing, learn and perform a variety of songs in six languages and styles. At her last recital in Toronto she presented Tschaikovsky's Jeanne d'Arc and Air Des Adieux, Berlioz's L'Absence, Wagner's Traume, Henry Purcell's Nymphs and Shepherds, Mozart's "L’Amero” from Il re pastore and Voi Che Sapete to positive reviews. She also sang with a Catholic boy's choir in Toronto with her voice described as “spiritual, combined dramatic feeling”. And back in Lewiston before her trip to the Orient she gave a recital including traditional songs "Love will find the way", "Meeting of the Waters", Purcell's "Nymphs and Shepherds", Dashing White Sergeant set to music by Henry Rowley Bishop, O That 'Twere Possible by Arthur Somervell, and Herbert Brewer's Fairy Pipers that were well received at the Judith Theater with publicity in various towns. In August she attended a function for Montana Governor Sam V. Stewart for which she gave an impromptu performance of Robin Adair and was called again "the Lewistown song bird".

=== Far East ===
In September 1916 Waite applied for a passport with destinations listed in the Orient of Hong Kong, Japan, Java, and Siam, leaving first on the SS Shinyō Maru from San Francisco. The passport application said her overall trip was recreational and to visit her brother. She extended the passport in October 1916 and a second extension in October 1917 while in Shanghai, China, during the Republic of China period. Soon two brothers of hers were in China - her second brother had left in March in 1917. She returned in December 1917. America had officially entered World War I in April. It was later said she performed amidst this more than a year in the Orient. A "Miss Waite" is noted singing in a March fundraiser for the American Red Cross.

=== Before Europe ===
A little more than a year after returning from the Orient, she is singing an Ave Maria at the Young Women's Catholic Patriotic Club in New York. The January 1920 US Census has Waite living in Manhattan listed as a music teacher and with her sister Grace who was studying music. Waite performed for the Temple Israel Community Center in Manhattan during the year as well. She performed at the Rialto Theatre in August. In November–December she performed in New Orleans, Louisiana. In mid-December she was back in the New York area performing at the Branford Theatre of Newark, New Jersey. In February 1921 she performed at the Broadway-Strand theater of Detroit, Michigan, followed by the same chain in St. Paul, Minnesota, and back to Detroit with the same chain of theaters about mid-March where she did several shows with appearances there extended into April.

Later she said she had gained a scholarship for attending the American Conservancy of Music in Fontainebleau, France, from the Conservatory in Toronto. In May 1921 Waite applied for a passport naming her residence as New York, and expected to travel for study in France, Italy, and the British Isles, leaving on the SS Paris June 23, 1921. She had an affidavit from her uncle Edward F. Waite, 4th district court judge of Minnesota and supplemental communications from Ruth to Edward for her birth certificate. She then performed in Milwaukee, Wisconsin, in early to mid-June.

=== France and Italy ===
She was at the first year of operation of the American Conservancy of Music in Fontainebleau, France, and back and forth to Italy; in 1940 the Conservatoire advertised she was a graduate. News began of her travels in September 1921 though she had arrived in June. In October she was profiled in the Paris edition of The Chicago Tribune and the Daily News, already noting she had studied there, described as "possesses a soprano voice of exceedingly fine quality", and was going off to Italy but had to delay in order to sing at the wedding of Princess Xenia Georgievna of Russia October 9. There were 85 students who attended June 25 to September 25 and the school planned to grow to 100 the next year. Students were recommended by governors of 36 states in addition to recommendations of local communities; New York was the source of 21 of the 85 students. The school was run under the French Ministry of Beaux-Arts and the Municipality of Fontainebleau. First place awards for the first school season was awarded to 7 students including Waite, who was noted as recommended from Chicago.

It is not clear what Waite did the winter of 1921-2.

In July 1922 a movie was released, The Hardest Way, filmed in France featuring Fannie Ward which included Waite in a role - the movie was reviewed negatively though. She later says, "...I departed with my [savings].... The war has done sad things to the Italian national art. There are not to-day enough places for native singers, not that the opera houses in Russia and Austria and Germany are mostly still in darkness. The American girl has a desperate time even to get a hearing. ... The musical authorities over there expect the American aspirant to pay for a chance at a debut, but many Americans cannot afford to pay. ...the coldest winter I ever spent was in that home in Florence, with its stone floors and stucco walls and wee small china stoves into which I daily stuffed thirty good cents worth of wood to get a faint flicker of heat. ... After [a while] I just stayed in bed till noon, studying my Italian grammar and my Italian repertory, while the winds whistled about me and my courage supplied the warmth.... all too soon that [savings] had melted. My teacher said I was ready for my debut...." Her teacher was Ernestina Bruschini in Florence.

By January 1923 news arrived back in Montana echoed in a few cities that she had arrived in Milan, Italy, and more publicity of her background with various details to note - she had already taken up the stage name of Marie Montana, and her father as a deputy Marshall had died, if not how. The Italy tour was under the Benito Mussolini regime of Italian Fascism and later in life it was said by a family member that "non-Italian names were unpopular". Reports of her efforts in Milan were good but she anticipated coming home. She later related an anecdote about her break through to the Italian stage:

"... one day I met a very honest and kind Italian who knew the situation and gave me good advice. ‘My dear, you'll have to wait long to get a hearing when you cannot pay. But - at length - you'll get it. It will come this way... some singer will be ill and if you can go on - in any part - without a rehearsal perhaps - you'll make your bow....’ At least after nearly three years waiting, I heard that the Musetta in a very humbug's little opera company had taken suddenly ill... I didn't know the part of Musetta... but I hurried to that manager... asked for an audition. ... I used Spanish Carmen swagger and fire for Italian Musetta.... I forgot my American restraints. I forgot everything but the terrible, urging anguish tugging at my heart which said to me all the time ’now's your chance!’... So I sang Musetta, with the fire of my desperation. ... 'brava’ he said.... ’but you can never learn the entire role in the short time left to the opening.’ (she said) ... It won't cost you a lira if I do not learn it, and if I don't you can hire somebody else.’ He agreed...."

She had three days after the initial audition to try to learn the part or be paid nothing. The lead of the show required extra rehearsals so she actually had more time. She said: "The critics were kind." The role of Musetta is in La boheme - and later she called this her big debut to the Italian stage, and is categorized as a lyric soprano role. Though she was approved of overall, the company was a financial disaster.

In March she was profiled in Lewistown, and echoed in other states, having moved on from Milan, though not mentioning the death of her father as a suicide. This is when it was reported she had performed in La boheme, was back at the Conservatory, and was to return to Milan for Rigoletto as Gilda the next season.

She left Paris for Italy again in August for a tour. It repeated she had been in La Traviata, (which was a performance in Genoa,) La boheme, Rigoletto, and added she had performed in Manon. Recently in Paris she also done concerts at the Hotel Majestic, as it was called then, and a Fourth of July at the Cercle de l'Union interalliée and would return for performances with the Concerts Colonne, also in Monte Carlo, and then in Switzerland.

In October 1923 she applied for a passport in Milan. It was typed up rather than in her own hand writing and includes some mistakes. A couple of years were shaved off her age and noted her father born in Wallace, Idaho, instead of New York. At some point she also visited Algiers.

She was profiled in Montana again in spring 1924 - the new news was she was staying another season, had sent pictures, was now in the opera Les pêcheurs de perles and looking to return to America in the summer, however she stayed on now in a new performance of La Scala again in Milan. She also heard of an awarding going on in America and made a wreathe for an osteopathic doctor which was brought by woman doctor to America.

She said "After four years [in Europe] I finished a season at the Teatro di San Carlo in Naples..." where she played for another season. She remained in Naples until June 1925. In spring 1925 coverage in Montana hailed her performance reception in France and Italy. A Montana veterinarian planned to visit her in Milan in April, but missed her. She was probably in Paris at the time near returning to America.

=== Returned to America ===
In August 1925 news in Montana was she had sailed on the French SS La Savoie for New York with the positive news of her performance - she registered her permanent address in Oakland, California. In September she performed on the first broadcast of the local Catholic radio station WLWL in New York. In October news appeared again in Montana summarizing her music career. In November came the additional news of a visit to Billings. Before that, she performed in Connecticut, New Jersey, and then was on radio WHAP as it was advertised in New York city in late December singing folk songs.

January 13, 1926, she sang at New York Banks’ Glee Club concert at Carnegie Hall and then with the American Orchestral Society concert January 31. In February Waite's god-mother and her husband returned to Montana after hearing her perform at another venue, and the Lewistown Woman's Club was arranging a fete to receive Waite with news of a western tour about to start.

A major profile in the newspapers including other performers, published in Utah and other states, spoke of her struggles in Italy. March 10, 1926, she again performed at Carnegie Hall, was scheduled for Tampa, Florida, in mid-March, then in Hackensack in late March, but was sick for that performance. She sang at the Unity Church in New Jersey in mid-April. She was in White Plains, New York, for the Westchester County Music Festival May 20–22, at which she sang five songs including some selections from Songs of India in German from Songs of the East by Granville Bantock, At the end of May she sang in a performance featuring women composers which was covered nationally. In June this was followed by a small blurb of publicity echoed in many states.

A profile was published in San Francisco where she was in August saying in part she had qualities of a coloratura soprano as long ago as her performances in Naples. It recalled the same background and added some of the roles she had played: debuted as Mimi, then Violetta in Genoa, then San Carlo company in Naples and lauded in Corriere about her performance as Gilda as a coloratura soprano, then Rome as Micaela where she won an ovation. Then she played Lucia again to complimentary coverage. In September she had performed in San Fernando. Then she went to Las Cruces, New Mexico, for the Department of Music at State College in Hadley Hall concert series. In early November she was in Casper, Wyoming, where she sang Deh, Vieni non Tarbot by Mozart, In the Silent Night by Rachmaninoff, Lass with the Delicate Air Michael Arne, "Il Bacio" by Luigi Arditi, and the Ave Maria by Bach, adding Christ went up into the Hills by Richard Hageman, a folk song from Kentucky, a negro spiritual Lil David, Play on Your Harp, when she performed in Billings, then in Lewistown, Great Falls November 9, Dillon on the 10th, and on to Santa Rosa, California, on the 16th for a concert at which she switched in Crying of Water by Louis Campbell-Tipton for Lil David, Play on Your Harp, and a fundraiser November 18 at which she added When I was Seventeen, possibly the translation of a Swedish folksong or in the native tongue. Later in November she gave a performance in Shreveport, Louisiana, and in December she was in nearby Monroe where she was called a lyric soprano. Following this tour it was announced a flower was named after her - a variety of Dahlia.

In January, 1927, she performed in Altoona, Pennsylvania, at which she swapped in some other songs: O sleep why does thou leave me by Handel, Thomas Linley's The Lark Sings High in the Cornfield and Invitation au Voyage by Henri Duparc, renditions of Chanson du Papillon, Sur l'Eau, Modest Mussorgsky's "Little Star so Bright", Ungeduld by Schubert, and Ständchen by Richard Strauss - and was billed as a coloratura soprano. In March she performed in Tampa including Overture Anacréon by Cherubini, a song from the introduction of the 3rd act of Lohengrin by Wagner, the aria Me Voila Seule by Bizet, Adagio Pathetique by Benjamin Godard, and various folks songs. She also sang at some clubs and at a hotel. The review of the earlier performances was she was good but not great, and as a lyric soprano - while more positive review covered her at the hotel. She was scheduled back in Orlando on March 18, then quickly she was in a performance in New York at Town Hall where she sang German, Italian, French, and English songs and the aria from Bizet's The Pearl Fishers. There were mixed reviews of her performance.

In May she attended and performed in the Central Kentucky Choral Society symphony which was broadcast on radio WHAS in which she sung "Siccome un di Caduto" from The Pearl Fishers. Later in May she sang with the Albany, New York, choir for their Mendelssohn concert at the Chancellor's Hall.

=== National Music League ===
In June Waite won an audition as soprano for the New York Philharmonic Orchestra for an August concert managed by the National Music League, with an aria from Louis by Marc-Antoine Charpentier and in a vocal quartet performance on Giuseppe Verdi's Rigoletto. She was soon advertised under their management. That performance series was at the Lewisohn Stadium and broadcast over radio WJZ as it was then known in New York, which was widely re-echoed across the NBC radio network. The rest of the summer and fall is an unknown. The following December she sang at Carnegie Hall with the Cleveland Orchestra which included Israel by Ernest Bloch, La Procesion del Rocio by Joaquín Turina, La Damoisselle Elue by Debussy, and "The Golden General" by Rimksy-Korsakov. She also sang with the Women's University Glee Club with Debussy's The Blessed Damozel.

In February 1928 it was announced Waite was to be the prima donna in recently developed opera Hugh the Drover which was being produced by the British Embassy in Washington, DC. Afterwards she sang on radio WMAL as it was known then in Washington DC, news of which was also in other states. In earlier-May she was at the 35th Annual May Festival at the University School of Music of Ann Arbor, Michigan. Then she joined with the 100plus voice Alamance Festival Chorus, half from Elon College, at the North Carolina Federation of Music conference held in Sanford, North Carolina, and at another concert at the college itself, where she joined in "Inflammatus" from Stabat Mater by Rossini and Italian Street Song by Victor Herbert, In July news was released she was on her way to visit her uncle Judge & Mrs. Edward F. Waite in Minnesota on her travels from New York to California for a performance at the Redlands Bowl, and stopping in Lewistown too. A profile of her was published in Montana and mentions some other recent performances like the May Festival in Ann Arbor and at the Chicago Symphony. She was soon in Billings where she sang some new songs: Qui la Voce Sua Soave by Vincenzo Bellini, local favorite No, No, John, Francis Hopkinson's My Day have been so wondrous Free, Believe me if all those Endearing Young Charms, Un bel dì vedremo from Madama Butterfly by Puccini, Wir Wandelten by Brahms, Stornellata Marinara by Pietro Cimara, and negro spirituals Nobody Knows the Trouble I've Seen and Oh, Didn't it Rain, and was at the summer Lyceum at Cheney near Spokane. She performed in Seattle on radio KFOA in late July while visiting her mother who was then living there. She commented about her stage name: “It is Italian and somehow they would listen longer to Maria Montana than to the American Ruth Waite. It was Maria in Italy, but when I found that I was being called Mariah at home I changed it to Marie. You see I am not really a relative of Bull Montana," (referring to the then famous Italian-American professional wrestler and actor.)

News was released in August of a 40 concert series of performances by Waite in California in the fall. She returned to the Redlands Bowl, in San Bernardino County, California, She then arrived in Los Angeles received with several social functions. By mid-September she was in back Oakland at the Women's Club's kick off of a season of concerts. Later in September she sang at a Church in Lewistown, with a profile recalling how she had sung in weddings, funerals and movie theaters, while she was visiting her sister. Many details of her performances were repeated with an occasional additions and again being called a coloratura soprano. At the end of September she performed at a high school at Ventura, California, and over in Oakland. In October she performed at the Ebell of Los Angeles and a school, again being called a lyric and coloratura soprano, including many of the songs previously mentioned but adding The Last Rose of Summer, The Gospel Train, and Annie Laurie. Later in October she performed at the Fontana Clubhouse in San Bernardino, and at the end of October was singing at the Mills College in Oakland.

In mid-November she sang at the Holy Trinity Lutheran Church in Manhattan, and then in New Jersey for the Thursday Morning Club. Waite then returned to the Holy Trinity Lutheran Church for the next two Sundays at the beginning of December. She then returned to Altoona adding The Sandman German Folk song, Pierrot by Wintter Watts, "My Lover is a Fisherman", (from Songs of India as well) by Lily Strickland, At Parting by James Hotchkiss Rogers to the songs she performed. Waite returned to the Lutheran Holy Trinity Church and sang in mid-January 1929.

A couple days later she was back on the National Concert Orchestra broadcasts to be echoed on the NBC radio network singing some of her known songs: Crying for Waters, Sandman, and The Lass with the Delicate Air. In early February she sang at the Natural Science Auditorium in Iowa City, Iowa, performing many of her known songs, and then at the Emery Auditorium in Cincinnati in later February adding many folk song arrangements and new songs: Waken, Lords and Ladies Gay, Moods, Tell Me Not of a Lovely Lass by Cecil Forsyth, Oh, that we two were Maying, Viking by Samuel Coleridge-Taylor, So Sweet is She by Patty Stair, "Full Fathom Five" by Thomas Dunhill, "Wings of Night" and "Pierrot" by Watts, Parade of the Wooden Soldiers by Leon Jessel, A Franklyn's Dogge by Alexander Campbell Mackenzie, What from Vengeance by Gaetano Donizetti. A critic review her performance in Cincinnati said the writer “...hereby proclaims the natural beauty of her voice, charm of platform manner and the technical equipment... as a ranking artist.... There is no inclination to explain the spell of enchantment that it casts.... not the slightest wavering from pitch and always there is excellent control.... In the essentially dramatic utterance she had full opportunity in the “One Fine Day” aria... Songs old and new, classical, emotional and modern, and negro spirituals made up her regular program..... please an audience of considerable patrons who relished what they heard, applauded as friends and relatives are want to do...."

Late in February she performed at the Mecca Temple in New York substituting for a sick soprano for the American Orchestra Society. She twice performed - the first with some “constricted upper tones… but the audience recalled her again… repeated the entire aria. These same upper tones were then much freer and her pitch less open to question." In March she was back on NBC stations and substituted in a Baltimore performance as well where she sang the Louise aria from the opera of the same name by Giuseppe Verdi. Late in March she was in the Lindsborg, Kansas, Messiah Festival, (a festival that is still going on.) She went on to performances in Montana, and then in April was in Madison, Wisconsin, for a Maennerchor concert performing German, Austrian and Finnish folk songs and arrangements plus I Hear America Singing by Harvey Bartlett Gaul and being called a coloratura soprano. A critic said she “proved popular from the first number. The generous sprinkling of folk songs found in her two groups admirably fitted both the easy grace with which she sang them and the smooth sweet quality of her voice.... (with other songs) with Miss Montana's voice displaying power in addition to the sweetness she had given her lighter songs." Another said: “Marie Montana, soprano soloist, carried her part in a clear, fine, well-trained voice, easily audible above the men's chorus. … Apparently, solo work with large choruses is Miss Montana's forte. Because her voice is strong and clear rather than very sweet, Miss Montana's work with the chorus was more enjoyable than her individual groups. Her sea selections were particularly good, however.… particularly fine dramatic ability… excellently sun with gayety, buoyancy, and convincing vocal dramatization." Another recalled the show in an end-of-the-year review as "one of the best ever given".

Meanwhile in later April she was in Pittsburg, Kansas, at the State Teacher's College where she joined in their Messiah performance, following which she briefly lost her voice for a time, before several performances again at the end of April and early May at an all-Kansas choir conference where she was sometimes billed as part of the “Oratorio Quartet of New York” and sometimes as a soloist. She was still on National Music League's list of performers in California and was profiled in Arizona. She was soon in the Apple Blossom Festival of Keene, New Hampshire, among singers for a concert held mid-May, and performed in Ocean Grove, New Jersey, where she was in June and then again in later July, with a performance in-between in Massachusetts.

There is a gap in mentions so far the earlier of the summer of 1929 - her next known performance was in mid-October in Zanesville, Ohio, still listed with the National Music League and coming to Arizona later in October where she was called a lyric coloratura soprano. She opened with The Puritans by Bellini, sang Old English, modern Italian and German songs, ending with the aria from Hamlet; a critic said: “Miss Montana won the approval of the large audience by her graciousness of manner and clearness of tonal quality.” She gave three encores and, “[in a Hamlet aria] she evinced a power and range unequaled in any of the other selections." As the Wall Street Crash of 1929 began October 24 she continued her performances. Late in October she performed for teachers in nearby Albuquerque adding an aria from Amleto by Franco Faccio to her performance repertoire. In November she appeared in Staunton, Virginia, and then was in a Santa Clara, California, fundraiser towards the end of November, and at Van Buys Philharmonic auditorium ending up then in nearby Los Angeles, and days later took a plane to Oakland to visit her sister, but was back in Los Angeles for a reception for another soloist by the end of November. Early December she was up the west coast up to Vancouver There she performed 13 songs: "Aria Qui la voce" from Puritana by Bellini, "O No, John", Gods All Powerful by Handel, In the Silence of Night by Rachmaninoff, Little Star by Mussorgsky, Beautiful Art Thou by Herbert E. Hyde, Stornellata Marinara by Cimara, the aria of Ophelia from Hamlet by Faccio, Wings of Night by Wintter Watts, Boyhood by Garnett, Daffodills by Wohlfarth-Grille, The Peace Flower by Bantock, Midsummer by Amy Worth. For that performance a critic said: “…with a voice of much substance, brilliant in quality, with fine carrying power and the ability to project her music wholeheartedly.” Not agreeing all songs were done well but “the Handel number delivered with seizing vocal power and dramatic instinct." while another said: “…very fine phrasing… excellent examples of precision…a powerful voice of which she has excellent command at times, her high notes in the forte were rather forced and occasional low notes were not as clear as they might have been but the aforementioned numbers were on the whole thoroughly pleasing performances with beautiful clear tone in the softer passages and we felt that they were particularly suited to Miss Montana's essentially dramatic style of interpretation."

The Great Depression in the United States was deepening but there was an announcement of a number of performances across the west coast: Phoenix and Albuquerque, Arizona, Boulder, Colorado, Los Angeles, California, and Seattle, Vancouver, Bellingham, and Cheney, Washington. But first she headed east with Cincinnati in December, and opening January 1930, in Danbury, Connecticut for a subscription concert, was in St. Louis by mid-February St Louis, with a quick dash to Elon College, North Carolina, and a birthday luncheon in Greensboro. Late in February she was in Staunton again. A critic said: "…a most pleasing personality … possesses beauty and graciousness of manner… beauty of tone, fresh, and pure in quality… a voice of dramatic intensity, with marvelous breath control, making the sustained phrases most effective.… The audience was so insistent that (the performers) were obliged to repeat (Ave Maria).

The April 1930 US Census had "Marie Montana", under that name, as a border, employed as a singer, living in Manhattan. A week later she was performing in Cincinnati, and a social reception.

She was to visit Butte mid-June and a profile published there reviewed her performances. There was news she planned to appear in Hollywood movie and performances in the west. While there she performed and was recalled to the stage five times, with flowers given to her often. She attended many luncheons and dinners. Later in June she performed in Wilmington, California, followed by San Pedro in early July, Austin, Texas, in September, Sacramento in October, and Oklahoma City. ×

=== California management and performances ===
As the Great Depression deepened, in November she appeared in newspapers managed by Grace Rankin and L. E. Behymer. She played at the Woman's Club House in Van Nuys with guests from area cities of the San Fernando Valley and beyond. Prolonged applause greeted her performance sections: “… an artist endowed with dramatic grace, magnificently rich voice, and the skill of perfect interpretation.” Flowers were presented and a reception held with her and Mrs. Fred A. Kellogg recently elected to state office. The last performance known was in December in Ames, Iowa By February 1931 the news was that she living in Van Nays and was then going to the opera with guest. Montana also began to be listed as a famous singers. A week later she performed in Santa Maria. She told the story of appearing in Naples for the San Carlo theater for Rigoletto substituting for sick prima donna. “It takes the young artiste to get her bearings but earned an ovation for Gilda's aria 'caro nome' with the orchestra rising to their feet as well." She arrived from Los Angeles for the performance. The performance went well and she went to a reception afterwards.

In June she performed in San Francisco. Then the San Francisco Monday Musical Club hosted Montana for a recital at the Greek Theater at which she sang "Fuyez à présent" by Philippe Gaubert.

Amidst the summer she was booked for performances through NBC Artists Service for the 1931-2 season on the West Coast and radio programs carried back east as well. In October she returned to Vancouver A critic said: “… endowed with an unusually fine voice, admirably disciplined, although at this time it cannot be said it was always sure in intonation…. In the matter of musicianship this singer is happily equipped, but it is to be regretted that she invested many of her songs with that innate vulgarity known as the “downward slur”…. Moreover, she did not always succeed in surrendering her personality in penetrating the underlying beauties of her music. The songs… were rendered with genuine artistic taste and distinction.… unfortunately, Debussy's “Mandoline” lacked the necessary rhythmic flow and delicacy of colors. Gaubert's “Ah Fuyez a Present” on the other hand proved much more effective in imagination.… The aria from 'Louise,’ which concluded the printed list, was more conspicuous for its vocal opulence than its interpretive insight.” Another critic addressed who attended the performance much more than the performance itself. Afterwards she scheduled to go to Medford, Oregon, and to the College of the Holy Names in Oakland to sing. She was back with the San Francisco Symphony later in November. That performance was called "a great triumph" by one critic who had come to the city. She was profiled noting some details - that mother was from San Francisco, and a grandfather was a "49er” coming to California for the gold rush. The critic here went on: “… won so outstanding a triumph…[from her October performance] that she was immediately reengaged as soloist for the popular concert … Nov 20…. (reviewing it) Alexander Fried, critic for the San Francisco Chronicle, says… ’She made her … debut a remarkably successful occasion. Fresh charm of voice and lyric sentiment warmly appearing were impressive in her singing…. Time and again recalled to the platform she responded to applause at last with a welcomed repetition of the ‘Carmen’ song.… similar praise… by Marie Hicks Davidson… (and) Marjory M. Fisher…." In later November she was again on NBC radio out of San Francisco, and there was a public posting of her responds to a fan letter. In the deepest part of the Great Depression she was coming to Butte and Dillon Montana to visit and perform on her way back to east. However she did not appear in public for a performance until later October in Madison, New Jersey, nearly a year later, and then again when she was spotted in the audience of another performance.

=== New York ===
Nearly four months after that she performed in January 1933 for a composers concert singing excerpts from Lazare Saminsky work The Plague "Gagliarda". and in April was back on NBC radio WJZ. Now in the shadow of the worst of the Great Depression, she had performed weekly from December 1932 to June 1933 for the New York Holy Trinity Lutheran Church again along with several other soloists. A friend visited her in New York in December.

As the Great Depression was slowly loosening its hold on America, for the 1933-4 season she was also part of Santa Barbara's season of performances though her specific appearance was not detailed. Mid-February, 1934, she was on NBC radio stations WEAF & WMAQ, and in March was in a Brooklyn club performance as part of a quartet singing Rubinstein. In mid-April she was again on NBC radio. A few days later she was in a Brooklyn choral society church concert.

=== Montana and the West ===
In May 1934 came the news that she was coming to visit and teach a “master class” in Billings, Montana. She was in Hardin in late June, then Billings at the Fox Theatre again reviewing her musical career. One performance was a fundraiser for the school. In Later June she was back in Lewistown. She was a guest and performed at the Congregational Church at the end of June in Hardin. She was invited to give a concert for Moose lodge group in July. Her appearances now framed as a tour of the state, and a concert in Great Falls in mid-July. Back in Lewistown she gave a talk on her life in Italy. Some details soon mentioned was that she was taught by Maria Brucschenem, Nadia Gontaruk, and the previously mentioned Esperanza Garrigue; and some 1500 people came to a Billings performance and fundraiser. A few days later she was a guest of the Lions club where she again gave a talk in Great Falls before her performance. She was feted at the Ladies Club meeting. and then did that concert for the Moose lodge in Bozeman and then again Butte. A picture of her was published in early August. A week later came news she was opening a studio for classes in Lewistown with a study on Faust. The next study was going to be on La boheme. Later in August she gave a talk at the Lewistown Rotary Club. The Women's Club recalled their sponsorship of one of her performances in mid-September. Later that month she sang at a funeral in Great Falls. In October she was hosted at a reception in Butte. She was then off to the west coast. She mid-January 1935 left Seattle to visit Philadelphia. Later in January she was back in Cheney, Washington where she performed at a nursing school. In February she performed in Spokane. In later April she was at the Denny-Watrous Gallery in Carmel. news of which made it back to Montana. A critic said: “… last Saturday evening's concert by Marie Montana was possibly the finest of the lot. It was given, unfortunately, before one of the smallest houses of the season. Here is a young American singer over whom hovers the mantle of authentic greatness. That she is not ranked in the top-flight of today's artists is more a lack of lucky incident than any readiness on her part. She has the temperament, she has depth, and above all she has a beautiful, golden voice with a peculiar varied tonal quality. At times her notes are clear and effortless as those of a bird; again her singing suggests “the horns of elf land, faintly blowing…."

Maria attended her mother death in late June 1935 in Oakland. Maria returned to sing a duet at the Bach festival in Carmel. She had arrived in mid-July and gave the concert; a critic said: “Alive and responsive from the crown of her head to the tips of her toes, her voice soured thrillingly over the sonorous, full-bodied orchestral accompaniment, bespeaking her love and appreciation for this great music." These performances were remembered as part of the first such Bach Festival. A few months later she performed for a store sponsored club concert.

In May 1936 she was a judge in the South California Festival contest. Six months later she performed in Van Nays and performed a couple weeks later in Los Angeles as part of a lineup of performances at the Trinity Auditorium. In December she sang in another Oakland concert.

In March 1937 she performed in San Francisco in a program that also featured Igor Stravinsky in concert. In early May she performed in Hartford, Connecticut.

In January 1938 she was part of the Oratorio Society presenting Mendelssohn's “St. Paul” oratorio at the Flushing High School Auditorium. Rehearsals began January 17 and concert would be April 30 at the Congregational Chapel in Flushing. She also performed in Tuxedo Park, New York in November.

A publicity photo of her was published in January 1939. Mid-January she sang in the Town Hall with comments that she “possessed the requisite command (of the songs) ... The quality of the voice was best in the upper medium." Late in February she was in a concert by the Oratorio and Festival Society of Yonkers and Music Guild of Dobbs Ferry and Hastings to be part of their “Elijah” concert.

=== Minnesota ===
Now 50 years old, and the Great Depression past, the April 1940 US Census has her living with her uncle Edward in Minneapolis, Minnesota. They were living in the home he owned on Queen Ave South, then valued at $7000, (about $130k in 2020.) He had been born in New York. In 1935 she had been living in New York City like her father. He was a district judge while she listed as a musician and private practical nurse, probably for him. They had a maid born in Norway as well. He was earning $5000/yr while she was listed as earning no money the previous year. She was mentioned in the local news in late July and also did a performance at the Northrop Auditorium.

She performed in the Brahms Requiem in the Minneapolis performance of 1941. In February that year she performed in Winona, Minnesota, at the College of Saint Teresa. “Clarity and sweetness of tone and a delightful sense of humor were much enjoyed in the program… The concert was sponsored by the Teresan Alumnae Association…The true placing of her voice and its clear, silvery quality… A group of songs in German and Italian… excellent diction adding much to the audience's enjoyment…. In April she sang with the St. Olaf Choir. That December the US suffered the Attack on Pearl Harbor.

== Baháʼí Faith ==
=== Minnesota ===
Having settled down in Minneapolis she maintained a relatively local schedule of performances some years but also began to operate in the context of a community.

==== 1940s ====
In January 1942 she performed at the Northrop Auditorium with the Minneapolis Symphony, with Arthur Rubinstein, and again with the orchestra in February and March. She had joined the Baháʼí Faith and from 1942 through 1944 Montana was a member of the Regional Teaching Committee for Minnesota/North Dakota/South Dakota working under the National Teaching Committee which reports to the National Spiritual Assembly of the Baháʼís of the United States. The charge of the committee was to oversee promulgation of the religion in the region.

In May 1942 the Minneapolis Baháʼí s observed the Declaration of the Báb in May. In June she assisted her uncle with a reception. In October she was mentioned on a civic community committee for international music through which she then spoke at a club entitled "Pan-American Music". The Baháʼí community observed the religious holy days of the Birth of the Báb, followed by the Birth of Bahá'u'lláh. The community also held a meeting to hear a Baháʼí who was visiting from Alaska.

As of 1943 she was known back in Lewistown as a vocal teacher in California and her past concerts in the Lewistown area. In June the Minneapolis Baháʼís held a public meeting. In September then member of the US National Spiritual Assembly Amelia Collins came to Minneapolis and met with community members. This was after a year of three race riots in America, and a national campaign was announced to take place across the final three months of the year to be on the theme of "race unity" a central form of the Baháʼí teaching of the oneness of humanity. Indeed the Minneapolis Baháʼís were part of this campaign when, in a couple weeks, they held its first a meeting of that campaign. Around the same time Jeynne Marie Stapleton pioneered to further the goals of the First Seven Year Plan, of raising a Baháʼí community in every state, from Minneapolis to Sioux Falls, South Dakota, which succeeded. That year was part of a series of meetings that was held in Sioux Falls. The Minneapolis community held another meeting on race issues in a couple weeks and then a more general one at the Center in November.

Across 1944 Montana does not otherwise appear in newspapers. The Baháʼí community she was part of did keep up a level of activity. Indeed in February her uncle Edward and another spoke as the local Baháʼís hosted its third race unity event of the campaign at their Center. A couple weeks later another public meeting was held broadening the theme to "world unity". Another community meeting bringing Baháʼís from Minneapolis and St. Paul together, amidst the general society antagonism between the cities, came in mid-April in a convention to elect delegates to the national convention. This was in fact a new development in the broader Baháʼí organization. Previously Baháʼí delegates represented their specific assembly community - now they were elected from the whole state's Baháʼí population. The interest in that year's national convention was high and many of the Minneapolis community went as it was the 100th anniversary of the founding of the religion. This national convention took place among the limitations and privations of World War II going on including limited boarding options in the Chicago area, and wavers and rationing that affected travel. Some 900 were planned on attending the convention from across America and some 1600 plus attended the final meeting at what was then called the Stevens Hotel as it was called then including attendees from Central and South America. The delegates and guests would get a specific printed program. A full text was indeed produced summarizing the first Baháʼí century. A radio program was part of the festivities and a print rendition of the program was made. Members of that year's national assembly elected included Horace Holley, Louis Gregory, Dorothy Beecher Baker, and Amelia Collins all of whom later were named as a Hand of the Cause of the religion, the highest appointed position available in the religion.

In June a series of Baháʼí speakers began to come at the Center in Minneapolis. The first was Orcella Rexford. Rexford was listed as one of a few women who "single-handedly" established new Baháʼí communities by giving an extended series of public lectures on then-popular topics and then inviting people to attend a series of classes on the religion. Indeed she was the first to do so. She was soon followed by Chinese aviator and peace activist Hilda Yen in July, two more speakers in September, which were followed by community observances.

In February 1945 the Baháʼís hosted a "color line" meeting with a panel with Jewish and Christian and Baháʼí speakers. In March the Baháʼí delegates elected their end of World War II Minnesota representatives to the national convention to elect the national assembly. They were Montana and Marie Tetu. Alas that year no national convention was gathered and instead members voted by mail and the same individuals were elected. In April the Baháʼís hosted a speaker's return to Minneapolis from her efforts in Latin America. World War II ended in Europe but continued in Asia until September. Between those events in June another Baháʼí came through who had gone to Colorado, then the community hosted a North Dakota visitor in October, and Montana and Mrs. Kenneth Klein were noted in the newspapers going to a regional Bahá´í conference to be held in Sioux Falls. Another speaker this time from the local Urban League in November.

Late in the period of service of the 1945-6 national spiritual assembly a member retired for reasons of health - Roy Wilhelm - resulting in a by-election that Montana would have participated in. This was the first time this had happened. The election resulted in adding Helen Elsie Austin to the membership.

In February 1946 Montana was again elected as one of the delegates to the national Baháʼí convention. In March she went to New York for a Baháʼí Naw-Rúz meeting to commemorate the new year, held on the 21st, possibly attending a conference on music while there as well, and then went to attend the national convention in April which was indeed held. This convention announced the beginning of a new plan, the Second Seven Year Plan, by Shoghi Effendi, then head of the religion, with four goals: the wider spread awareness of the Faith in Latin America, the completion of the interior ornamentation of the House of Worship, raising the various some communities to the state of national organizations - for Canada to form its own, along with regional ones for Central and South America, and initiating a campaign of Baháʼís to reach Europe in the post-war period. Later should undertake her own travels to Europe. The members of the national assembly elected that year were, in order of the number of votes received, Elsie Austin, Philip Sprague, Horace Holley, Dorothy Baker, Amelia Collins, George Latimer, Edna True, Paul Haney, and William Kenneth Christian. Messages were received from Germany, where Baháʼís had been held in concentration camps, and care relief packages were being organized to be sent to Europe and the Philippines, and Baháʼí pioneers, who were expected to support themselves, began to volunteer. See Baháʼí Faith in Europe.

In October Montana performed a song at a Baháʼí meeting in Minneapolis. Though the nature of the meeting was not reported in the Star Tribune she sang “How beautiful upon the Mountains” by F. Flaxington Harker as part of a series of interracial meetings.

In January 1947 the Baháʼís had a short show on local radio, and began to seek the legal recognition to perform legally recognized marriages. A Madison, Wisconsin, Baháʼí came to town to speak at the Center in February, and a pair of sisters came through on their way moving in Switzerland. In October another speaker came through amidst a regional meeting of Baháʼís, and another in November including another talk before a local church.

One Minneapolis Baháʼí attended the Louhelen Baháʼí School in January 1948, while Montana herself went in July to give a talk at another institution - the Green Acre Baháʼí School - and gave performances including songs from multiple countries, languages, and religious backgrounds announced as a lyric soprano. Upon her return in August she went with her uncle for a summer vacation in Canada. Meanwhile Ruth Moffett, another of those women who had success raising up Baháʼí communities, spoke in Minneapolis. The community advertised the observance of the Birth of Bahá'u'lláh, followed by a talk by a visiting Baháʼí held at the Nicollet Hotel.

In 1949 the Baháʼís held their state convention in February, as well as a local observance of International Youth Day. They then advertised their new year observance with talks from various local leaders, and a youth speaker from India attending Dunwoody College of Technology gave a talk in mid-July. Later in July Montana, accompanied by Helen Frink, went on a tour to West Coast Baháʼí communities. A 1949 state guide book named Montana singer as a prominent singer. There was the November observance for Bahá'u'lláh, and another meeting for Baháʼí speakers including one back from Europe.

==== Most of the 1950s ====
In 1950 Baháʼís held their state convention in January, and there was a showing of color slides of Israel in February, and a visiting Baháʼí in March. In July the local community observed the holy day of the Martyrdom of the Báb and the Birth of Bahá'u'lláh then observed in November, followed by Horace Holley came and spoke about the progress of the Wilmette House of Worship in November.

In March 1951 the Baháʼís in Minneapolis observed their new year, and Montana was one of speakers for the May observance of the Baháʼí holy day of the Declaration of the Báb. In about 1951 former Polish diplomat Ola Pawlowski left her position in Winnipeg and encountered Montana: “I took leave of the Polish community [ed- in Winnipeg] and the Bahais and took the bus to Minneapolis. I was the guest of Maria Montana, a very gracious lady who had at one time been an opera singer but at that time kept house for her old father and was a very active member of the Baháʼí community. At her home I met a lady who epitomized the range of backgrounds found among Baháʼís. This lady arrived in a long baby-blue Cadillac, swathed in silver fox furs, bedecked in diamonds and awhirl with flowers, lace and feathers. But that evening she gave an excellent talk on the Baháʼí Faith. The next day she gave me a ride to Chicago.”

In early October a Baháʼí community talk was held, followed later October when Montana managed the Minneapolis Baháʼí community public meeting to observe UN Week at the Center. In December the Baháʼís held their state convention.

In January 1952 Baháʼís observed World Religion Day, and in March Montana gave a talk for the Baháʼí community observance of Naw Rúz at the Center. In July the community observed the Martyrdom of the Báb, and joined in observing the launch of a holy year in October commemorating the centenary of Bahá'u'lláh's experience in the Síyáh-Chál which began the Baháʼí Faith, and the observance of the Birth of Bahá'u'lláh in November.

In January 1953 Baháʼís held World Religion Day, and in February Montana was a guest in Oakland, California, looking at presenting concert related to the Baháʼís. That year the House of Worship was finished, and the community held its observance of the Declaration of the Báb and the Martyrdom, with a major conference held that year and launching a plan, the Ten Year Crusade, for the world wide spread of the religion. In October Florence Mayberry came to give a talk, followed by another traveling Baháʼí in November.

In January 1954 Baháʼís held World Religion Day again, and in February Montana was one of the speakers for the Minneapolan Baháʼí community observance of National Brotherhood Week. The Baháʼís held their Naw Rúz meeting in March, the Declaration of the Bab in May, the Martyrdom with a slideshow of developing Baháʼí sites in Haifa. In September the period of the introduction of the religion in America was noted with an event at the Center. In October Florence Mayberry returned for a talk at the Center. Then in November Montana spoke for the community observance of the Birth of Bahá'u'lláh at the Center. In December came news that a student of Montana was singing in Winona, California.

A Baháʼí spoke for the observance of World Religion Day in January, and another for Brotherhood Week in February. In March came the New Year observance, followed by another giving a talk based on the Dawnbreakers text for the Declaration of the Báb observance. A special mention came the same day of the razing of the Baháʼí Center in Tehran, Iran, and instance of the Persecution of Baháʼís. A Baháʼí wrote a letter to the editor afterwards speaking to the facts of the situation. The Martyrdom observance was then held in July, In later July a couple spoke at the Center about their recent trip to Turkey. This was followed by the observance of the Birth of Bahá'u'lláh in November, In December the same couple spoke again a week before the state convention.

In January 1956 Baháʼís observed World Religion Day, and in February Montana represented the Baháʼís at a panel of speakers hosted by the local Urban League for an interracial interfaith meeting. Naw Rúz was observed in March, The AP echoed a comment that there were more 900 spiritual assemblies according to updated statistics. A Baháʼí came again from Latin America giving a talk about her experiences. A few days later another Baháʼí spoke on the anniversary of the religion reaching America. In October the Baháʼís added observing the anniversary of the founding of the UN at the Center, and the observance of the Birth of Bahá'u'lláh in November. Three delegates were going to the national convention the next year. The year closed with a show of a club from the Northside YMCA held at the Center.

In January 1957 World Religion Day was observed and were part of a community wide observance campaign of Brotherhood Week. Naw Rúz was observed, and the Declaration of the Báb. Then came a profile of the Baháʼí community in the newspapers late in May. The profile included quotes, some teachings of the religion and addressing perceived misconceptions, the sense of regular meetings about once a month, briefly on the history of the religion, and the present state of the Minneapolis Baháʼí community of 32 adults just of Minneapolis.

The Martyrdom of the Báb was observed in July, Montana sang for a regional Baháʼí conference hosted in later September. Color slides of the Holy Land and Shrine of the Báb were shown at the Nicolette Hotel in early October, and UN Day in late October. News came in early November of the unexpected death of Shoghi Effendi. The year finished with the election of delegates.

==== Late 1950s ====
In January 1958 the Baháʼís held World Religion Day, Montana's brother Edward died in Seattle in February, and the community joined in an Urban-League meeting on race a couple weeks later. A Naw Rúz event was held that was also a memorial for the death of Shoghi Effendi. This was followed directly by the Baháʼí having World Youth Day at the Center as well. In later March Montana's uncle had had a stroke at the Athletic Club and didn't recover - he died late in April. In going through his papers she found a nearly finished letter she thought worth forwarding. A talk was offered in mid-April at the Baháʼí Center, and Baháʼís returned from an international conference in earlier May. In July the Baháʼí observed the Martyrdom of the Báb, and news arrived of the death of one of the Baháʼís that had gone on to Switzerland.

On the heels of her loses of family she left for a tour of France, Italy, and Switzerland on the SS Statendam in a mid-September trip to promote the religion. She had a farewell party at the Minneapolis Baháʼí Center. A year later she was back and visible giving a talk again for the Baháʼí community observance in Minneapolis for UN Week. While away she had spent time Italy, being called a Baháʼí pioneer in the newspaper, and was planning returning and going to Naples. She was also settling her uncle estate in Minneapolis. About 6 months later she gave a talk for a Baháʼí meeting called Race Amity Day hosted at a Church. Another 8 months later she was back in Minneapolis giving a talk for the community observance of World Religion Day at the Center entitled “The Fundamental Oneness of Religion".

=== Pioneer to Italy ===
It is known that Montana was on another period in Italy in Florence in 1962 Montana as a pioneer. She also supported the small Bari Baháʼí community between 1963 - 1966. There is a picture of her there in 1964; the community rose from 2 to 20 members and elected its first local assembly in 1967. While in Europe in the period she also sang at the dedication program of the Baháʼí House of Worship in Germany in 1964.

=== California ===
In March 1966 Montana was back giving a Baháʼí talk in San Diego entitled “The New Day”. In June she gave another Baháʼí talk with slides in Iscondido. In January 1967 she was a judge of tryouts for San Diego Metropolitan Opera auditions organized by the San Diego Opera Guild held at the Horace Mann Junior High Jan 15. Winners advanced to regional semifinals at the University of Southern California in early February then on to semifinals in New York in April and winners there got scholarships and individual teaching for a Met performance in November. June she gave a talk about her debut and concert experiences for the Santa Fe Associates of the San Diego Opera Guild, and was a judge in a 1967 contest for the Metropolitan Opera in San Diego. The San Diego Baháʼís observed the centenary of the proclamation of Bahá'u'lláh in October 1967 of his message to the rulers of the world - Maria sang at the event held at the San Diego Woman's Club.

In January 1968 Montana was guest at dinner after informal preview of western region Met Opera auditions. Formal auditions to be held Feb. Maria and Mrs. Saunderson spoke to the young singers. Another reception was held in February. She was Director of Musical Merit Foundation in San Diego, for the Opera Guild.

== Died ==
Montana died from injuries in a car accident March 16, 1971, in La Jolla, California at age 71 after living there less than a year. She died at Scripps Memorial Hospital about 3pm of head and internal injuries. She was reported driving a station wagon and failed to yield on merging from Mesa Way onto La Jolla Blvd to northbound traffic. She was buried in El Camino Memorial Park.

== Posthumous ==
A Maria Montana Award was established at the Albuquerque, New Mexico, Vocal Artistry Art-song Festival in the later 2000s, itself starting in 2008 and giving its first concerts in 2009 for student singers and pianists of New Mexico. Some of the known winner were:

- 2013 - Ejerson B.
- 2015 - Roberto Garza
- 2017 - Jillian Tibbets
