= Bennett Hill (disambiguation) =

Bennett Hill (1893–1977) was an American auto racer.

Bennett Hill may also refer to:

- Bennett D. Hill (1934–2005), American historian

== Places ==
- Bennett Hill (lunar mountain), mountain on Earth's moon
- Bennett Hill Farm, in New York
