= Anshe =

Anshe may refer to:

== Synagogues and Jewish organizations ==
- Anshe Sfard, a synagogue in New Orleans, Louisiana
- Anshe Sholom B'nai Israel, a Modern Orthodox congregation in Chicago, Illinois
- Bernard Zell Anshe Emet Day School (BZAEDS), a Jewish school in Chicago, Illinois
- Temple Anshe Amunim (Pittsfield, Massachusetts), a Jewish congregation in Pittsfield, Massachusetts
- Temple Anshe Hesed, a Reform synagogue in Erie, Pennsylvania

== Other uses ==
- Anshe Chung, a character in the online world Second Life
