= Henry L. Blatner =

American architect

Henry LeRoy Blatner (August 3, 1911– February 3, 1978) was an American architect.

== Biography ==
Blatner designed the Clarksville Elementary School (Clarksville, New York) in rural Clarksville, New York, outside of Albany, in Modern Movement style. The school was featured in architecture publications and affected school design nationwide, and has resonance in green design issues today.

The application of what Blatner termed "bilateral lighting" was one innovation in the school's design, stemming from Blatner's studies of efficacious lighting. Blatner used indirect south light and direct northern light to achieve an even, consistent lighting pattern, giving building orientation a primary role in the interior function of the school. Blatner went on to become a successful architect in the Capital Region. He contributed to the design of Empire State Plaza, for example.

The Clarksville Elementary School is the only NRHP-listed building that lists Blatner as an architect in the National Register's database. A dormitory building at 32 Union Avenue, designed by Blatner, is actually regarded as a modern intrusion in the NRHP-listed Union Avenue Historic District, detracting from the historic character of that district.

His design for the Temple Anshe Amunim in Pittsfield, Massachusetts, completed in 1964 has since won many architectural awards and has been featured in several publications for its unique features, which include a domed synagogue and golden ark.

Blatner was born in Albany, New York on August 3, 1911. He was educated at the University of Pennsylvania where he won the Paul Philippe Cret Prize, and obtained a Master of Architecture degree from MIT in 1935. After starting the firm of Blatner and VanderBogert in Albany in 1940 he served in the U.S. Navy Reserve from 1943 to 1946, establishing his own firm again in 1946, once again in Albany. The firm was known by 1972 as Blatner, Mendel & Mesick.
