= Oronoque (estate) =

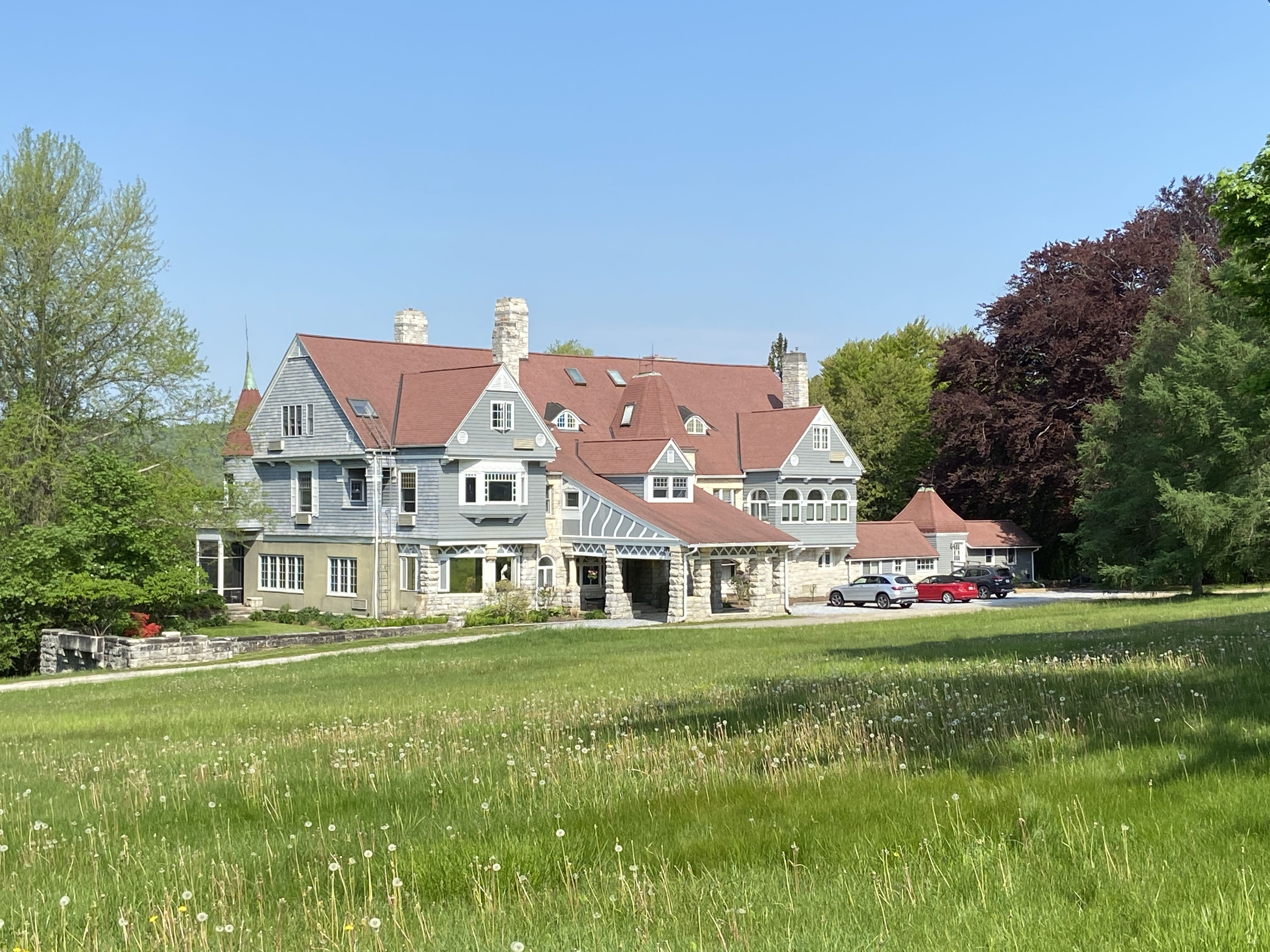
- Alternative names: Indian Hill

General information
- Status: privately owned
- Location: 11 Prospect Hill Rd.
- Town or city: Stockbridge, Massachusetts
- Country: USA
- Coordinates: 42.2952°N 73.3188°W
- Completed: 1887
- Grounds: 11 acres (4.5 ha)

Design and construction
- Architect(s): William Henry Miller
- Other designers: Landscape Architect: Nathan Franklin Barrett

Oronoque was built as the country home of Birdseye Blakeman, Esq., and is located in Stockbridge, Massachusetts. The building was designed by William Henry Miller and built by Powers & Sons, Rochester. The house exterior was built to resemble a royal hunting lodge. The 12-acre (4.9 ha) grounds were landscaped by Nathan Franklin Barrett.

== History ==
Birdseye Blakeman (1824-1894) purchased 12 acres (4.9 ha) of land on Prospect Hill in Stockbridge, Massachusetts in 1886 and built the summer home "Oronoque" in 1887. Cut stone was used to construct the basement and first floor, wooden framing and shingling the second and third stories. The house was named Oronoque after the district in Stratford, Connecticut where Blakeman's permanent residence was located. Oronoque originally had 24 rooms and 7 fireplaces. A caretaker's residence and a six-car garage were added later. Blakeman was partners with Henry Ivison (at 4 Prospect Hill Road) of the New York school textbook publishing firm Ivison, Blakeman and Co. This firm later consolidated with others into the American Book Company. Blakeman passed in 1894, just a few years after the house was built. His widow summered at Oronoque until her death in 1912.

The property was sold by Mrs. Blakeman's granddaughter, Anna M. Vesey, to banker Norman Davis in 1912. He was an ambassador-at-large for the United States and served as Chairman of the American Red Cross from 1938 to 1944. The Davises added extensive stonework to the property. When Mr. Davis died in 1944 he left a maintenance endowment for the property in his will. The house was then used for a few years during summers for the Meadowcroft Camp School for boys and girls. In 1949 the long-time caretakers, Wendel H. Krebs and his wife Ruth, were transferred a cottage and an acre of land from the estate.

Marjorie H. Rosenthal acquired the property in 1950. She had plans to create the Oronoque School, a summer drama, art, and music school for girls. These plans were abandoned the next year when Marjorie, now Mrs. Basil Greenblatt, became seriously ill.

=== Indian Hill ===
Julliard-trained baritone Mordecai Bauman and his wife Irma Bauman acquired Oronoque in 1967 and founded the Indian Hill Music Workshop. A theater, dance studio, two "longhouses" (dormitories each housing 21 people), eleven wooden "teepees" (each with five beds), and two cottages were added. The property also had a swimming pool and two tennis courts. Notable alumni include Arlo Guthrie, Julie Taymor, Ruth Laredo, Dennis Boutsikaris and Frank Rich. Carly Simon taught guitar and was a cabin leader. The illegal garbage dumping in 1965 detailed in Guthrie's "Alice's Restaurant" was done next door to Indian Hill, on Nelson Foote, Sr.'s property.

In 1975 Brooklyn College, where Mordecai Bauman taught, acquired Indian Hill from the Baumans. Due to funding cuts Indian Hill was discontinued by the end of 1977. Boston University acquired the property in 1978 to support Tanglewood.

In 1986 the building was purchased by the Oronoque Realty Corp., which converted the mansion into six condominiums and later built four duplexes down the hill on the estate. The various teepees, longhouses, and other camp buildings were removed. The property continues as a condominium association to the present.

== See also ==
- Berkshire Cottages
