= Paul Bunyan (operetta) =

1941 operetta by Benjamin Britten

- Operetta by Benjamin Britten
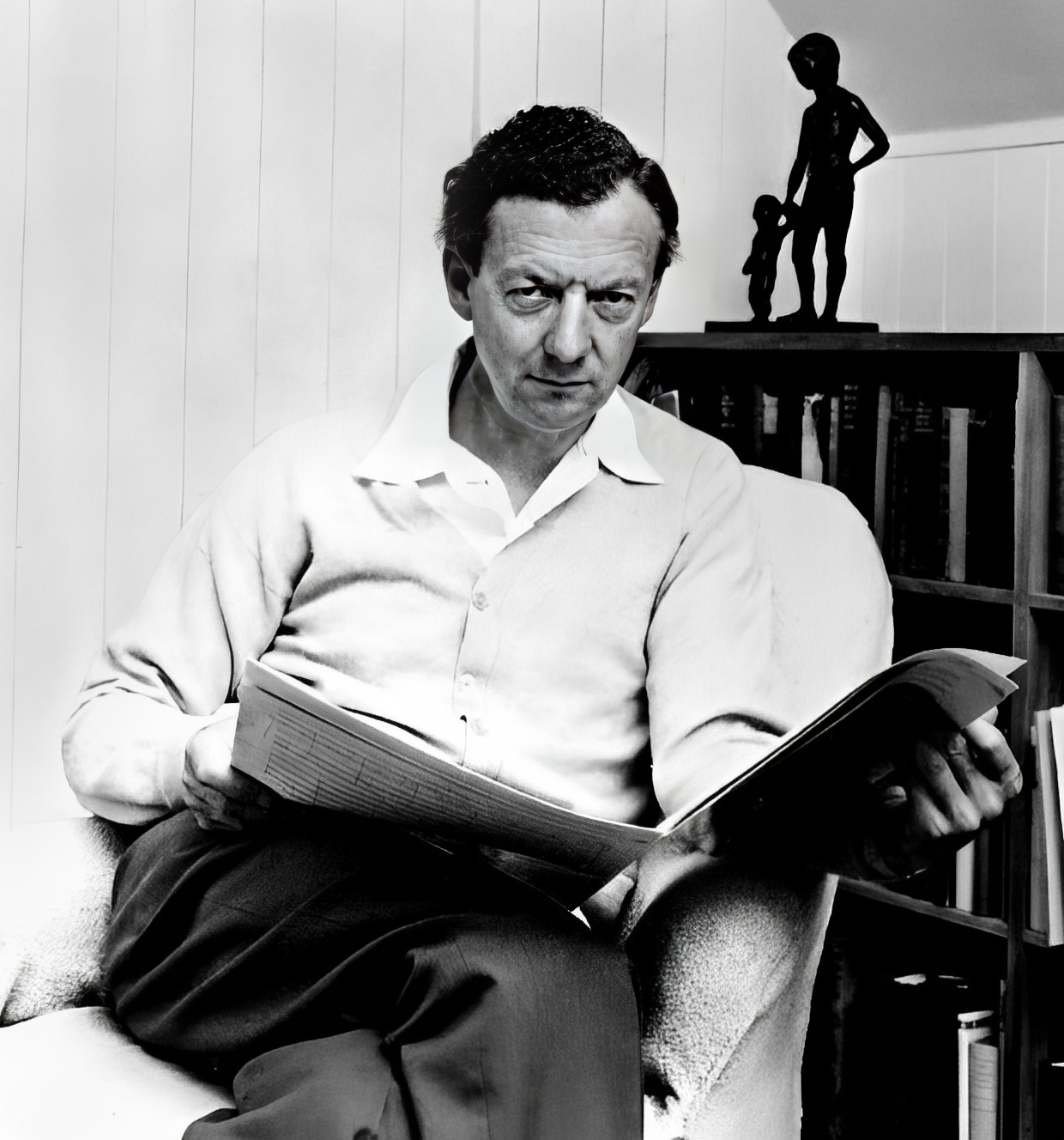
- The composer in 1968
- Librettist: W. H. Auden
- Premiere: 5 May 1941; Columbia University

Paul Bunyan, Op 17, is an operetta in two acts and a prologue composed by Benjamin Britten to a libretto by W. H. Auden, designed for performance by semi-professional groups. It premiered at Columbia University on 5 May 1941, to largely negative reviews, and was withdrawn by the composer. Britten revised it somewhat in 1976 and it has subsequently had numerous performances and two commercial recordings. The story is based on the folkloric American lumberjack, Paul Bunyan, with the music incorporating a variety of American styles, including folk songs, blues and hymns. The work is strongly sectional in nature, highly reminiscent of the 'Broadway musical' style of the period.

== Roles ==
Role	Voice	Premiere cast, 5 May 1941 (conductor: Hugh Ross)
The Voice of Paul Bunyan	offstage spoken role for male voice	Milton Warchoff
Tiny, Paul's daughter	soprano	Helen Marshall
Johnny Inkslinger	tenor	William Hess
Hot Biscuit Slim, a good cook	tenor	Charles Cammock
Narrator and Balladeer (in the Interludes)	baritone or tenor	Mordecai Bauman
Sam Sharkey, a bad cook	tenor	Clifford Jackson
Ben Benny, another bad cook	bass	Eugene Bonham
Hel Helson, foreman	baritone	Bliss Woodward
Cross Crosshaulson, a Swede	bass	Walter Graf
Jen Jenson, a Swede	bass	Ernest Holcombe
Pete Peterson, a Swede	tenor	Lewis Pierce
Andy Anderson, a Swede	tenor	Ben Carpens
Fido, a dog	soprano	Pauline Kleinhesselink
Moppet, a cat	mezzo-soprano	Harriet Greene
Poppet, a cat	mezzo-soprano	Augusta Dorn
Western Union Boy	tenor	Henry Bauman
John Shears, a farmer	baritone	Leonard Stocker
Quartet of the Defeated (Blues)	contralto, tenor, baritone, bass	Adelaide Van Way, Ben Carpens, Ernest Holcombe, Eugene Bonham
Four cronies of Hel Helson	four baritones	
Heron, Moon, Wind, Beetle, Squirrel	spoken roles	
lumberjacks, farmers, frontier women, animals, trees, wild geese

== Synopsis ==
Place: In and around the American forest
Time: Early- to mid- twentieth century

=== Prologue ===
In the forest

The old trees like life to be slow ("Since the birth of the earth"), but are challenged by four young trees and three wild geese. The geese explain that the old trees will have to leave when a Man arrives: Paul Bunyan will be born at the next blue moon. To the horror of the old trees, the moon turns blue ("It isn't very often the conservatives are wrong").

First ballad interlude

The Narrator recounts the birth and growth of Paul, who gained 346 pounds every week, became as tall as the Empire State Building and had a stride of 3.7 miles ("The cold wind blew through the crooked thorn"). One night, he awoke to find that his forehead was being licked by Babe the Blue Cow. The two of them leave for the South, where Paul sets up a camp.

=== Act 1 ===
Scene 1: A clearing in the forest

Paul recruits lumberjacks from all over Europe ("My birthplace was in Sweden, it's a very long way off"). The Swedes quarrel over which of them should be foreman, but a Western Union Boy bicycles in with a telegram from the King of Sweden, whose recommended foreman, Hel Helson, arrives and is duly appointed by Paul. However, there is still a need for some cooks who can provide the lumberjacks with nutritious food. Bad cooks Sam and Ben, devotees (respectively) of soup and beans, arrive ("Sam for Soups, Ben for beans", a parody of campaigns): . Johnny Inkslinger, an impecunious book-keeper, also turns up, but wishes to be independent and refuses offers of soup, beans and recompense before travelling on. Paul predicts that, as Inkslinger has no resources, he will have to return. Sam and Ben recruit cats Moppet and Poppet, and the dog Fido, to aid them in their work ("The single creature lives a partial life").

It is bedtime. Paul introduces a "dream of warning", sung by a quartet of the defeated ("Gold in the North came the blizzard to say"). Inkslinger, equally defeated, returns and accepts the job of bookkeeper.

Second ballad interlude

The Narrator describes how Paul went wife-hunting, found an appropriately sized partner (Carrie), and married her ("The Spring came and the Summer and Fall"). A daughter, Tiny, was born, but her parents' marriage was unhappy, and she and Carrie left home. Some years later, Carrie died, and Paul, before her funeral, promised Tiny that he would be a better father.

Scene 2: The camp

While Paul is away, there is discontent at the unvarying rations of soup and beans ("Do I look the sort of fellow Whom you might expect to bellow"). Inkslinger tries to persuade Sam and Ben to vary the menu, but they walk away in a huff. The lumberjacks turn on Inkslinger, but are interrupted by the offstage voice of Slim ("In fair days and in foul Round the world and back"). He arrives and describes his attempts to "find himself" by continuous travelling ("I come from open spaces"). It turns out that he can cook flapjacks, cookies, fish, steak, and the loggers are appeased.

Paul returns with Tiny. Inkslinger, dispirited, tells Fido the story of his life, which he feels he has wasted ("It was out in the sticks that the fire of my existence began"). The lumberjacks mob Tiny, who is still mourning her mother's death ("Whether the sunshine upon children playing"), but she only has eyes for Slim. Paul wants to know if there were any problems while he was away. Inkslinger tells him that Hel Helson broods too much and keeps bad company, and that some of the men, particularly one called John Shears, are tired of logging and want to take up farming. They part on good terms, and Paul muses on the subject of the Actual and the Possible as the curtain falls.

=== Act 2 ===
Scene 1: A clearing

Paul summons the lumberjacks and asks those who would like to be farmers to accompany him to the land of Heart's Desire, where everything is fertile. Shears and the others rejoice ("It has always been my dream"). Paul leaves Hel Helson in charge, telling him that the Topsy-Turvey Mountain needs to be cleared.

Hel's four cronies try to persuade him to mount a rebellion against Paul and Inkslinger. He sends them away, but the voices of a Heron, the Moon, the Wind, a Beetle and a Squirrel tell him that he is a failure ("Heron, heron, winging by"). Fido attempts to console him ("Won't you tell me what's the matter?"), but Hel kicks him out. Moppet and Poppet rejoice that they are not sentimental, like dogs ("Let Man the romantic in vision espy").

When Paul returns, so do Hel's cronies, who persuade him to pick a fight with Paul. Tiny and Slim, oblivious of the sounds of the offstage fight, celebrate their love ("Move, move, from the trysting stone"). Hel, unconscious, is carried in ("Take away the body and lay it on the ice") . When he wakes up, he makes peace with Paul and rejects the cronies. The chorus hails a "great day of discovery" as Tiny and Slim continue their duet.

Third ballad interlude

The Narrator recounts the continuing success of the logging industry and of Slim and Tiny's love ("So Helson smiled and Bunyan smiled"). Eventually, Babe indicates to Paul that it is time to move on, and he realises that she is right. It is Christmas Eve.

Scene 2: The Christmas party

Amid the seasonal festivities, Inkslinger makes a number of announcements ("Dear friends with your leave this Christmas Eve"). Slim and Tiny will marry and move to Midtown Manhattan ("Carry her over the water"). Hel Helson will be joining the Administration in Washington to lead the Federal Plan of public works. John Shears has taken time off from his farm to join the party. As everyone cheers, the Western Union Boy reappears with a telegram from Hollywood. It is an invitation to Inkslinger to become a technical advisor for an all-star lumber picture! Finally, Paul takes his leave ("Now the task that made us friends in a common labour, ends"), and a Litany ("The campfire embers are black and cold") is sung. Inkslinger asks "Paul, who are you?", and Paul replies: "Where the night becomes the day, Where the dream becomes the fact, I am the Eternal guest, I am Way, I am Act".

== Recordings ==
- Paul Bunyan – Plymouth Music Series Orchestra and Chorus conducted by Philip Brunelle. Studio recording, 1988. Label: Virgin Classics
- Paul Bunyan – Royal Opera House Orchestra and Chorus conducted by Richard Hickox. Recorded live from performances at Sadler's Wells Theatre in London on 23, 24, and 28 April 1999. Label: Chandos Records
