= Clarksville Elementary School (Clarksville, New York) =

Historic building in New York, United States

- U.S. National Register of Historic Places
- Location within New York Location within the United States
- Location: 58 Verda Lane, Clarksville, Albany County, New York
- Coordinates: 42°34′38.29″N 73°57′15.57″W
- Area: 14 acres (5.7 ha)
- Built: 1949
- Architect: Blatner, Henry L.
- Architectural style: Modern Movement
- NRHP reference No.: 08000580
- Added to NRHP: July 3, 2008

The Clarksville Elementary School in Clarksville, New York, also known as Clarksville Grade School, is a Modern Movement-style building built in 1949. The design by Henry L. Blatner. Harry Blatner was an architectural success that was featured in nationwide publications and led to much change in how schools were designed. The application of bilateral lighting was one innovation. The school was closed after the 2010–11 school year. It is currently home to the Albany County Sheriff's Uniform Patrol Division.

It was listed on the U.S. National Register of Historic Places in 2008.
