= Theodore Lettvin =

American pianist and conductor (1926–2003)

Theodore Lettvin c. 1952

Theodore Lettvin (October 29, 1926 – August 24, 2003) was an American concert pianist and conductor. He was one of the four children of Solomon and Fannie Lettvin, two Jewish-Ukrainian immigrants who settled in Chicago. Neurophysiologist and MIT professor Jerome Lettvin was his eldest brother.

== Biography ==
Lettvin's first concert was at the age of five at the Lyon & Healy in Chicago. On March 15, 1939, he appeared as a soloist with the Chicago Symphony Orchestra under conductor Frederick Stock, performing the first movement of Mendelssohn's Piano Concerto no. 1. As a teenager, he was accepted as a scholarship student of Rudolf Serkin and Mieczysław Horszowski at the Curtis Institute of Music in Philadelphia. In his twenties, he won the Michaels Memorial Award, First Prize in the Queen Elisabeth of Belgium International Piano Competition. He made his European debut touring France with violinist Sidney Harth in 1951-1952 in a concert series organized by the National Music League and the Jeunesses Musicales International. He also toured South Africa in 1974 in a series of concerts under the auspices of the Johannesburg Musical Society.

Lettvin performed with the New York Philharmonic, and the symphony orchestras of Boston, Chicago, Cleveland, Washington, Atlanta, Vienna, Tel Aviv, and Tokyo. He also participated in the summer festivals at Tanglewood, Ravina, Saratoga, Sarasota, Salzburg and Interlochen.

Prior to his appointment as Professor Emeritus by Rutgers University and the University of Michigan, Lettvin was a Distinguished Professor in their music departments, where he directed their Doctor of Musical Arts and Artist Diploma programs. Before joining these universities, Lettvin was on the faculty of the New England Conservatory of Music, the Cleveland Music School Settlement, and Artist in Residence at the University of Colorado Boulder.

He died in August 2003. A concert series in Bradford, New Hampshire is named in his honour.

== Discography ==
Index to performances by Theodore Lettvin on compact disc
Composer	Work	Performance Date	CD number
BACH	English Suite No. 3	March 28, 1962	1
BACH	English Suite No. 3 excerpt	(unspecified date)	4
BACH-BUSONI	Rejoice, Beloved Christians	April 16, 1975	13A
BACH-BUSONI	Rejoice, Beloved Christians	July 1977	14
BARTOK	Scherzo for Piano & Orchestra	December 20, 1964	6
BARTOK	Two Romanian Dances	March 28, 1962	1A
BEETHOVEN	Cello Sonata No. 1 (Olefsky)	unspecified	11
BEETHOVEN	Cello Sonata No. 3 (Olefsky)	unspecified	11
BEETHOVEN	Cello Sonata No. 4 (Olefsky)	unspecified	11
BEETHOVEN	Cello Sonata No. 5 (Olefsky)	unspecified	12
BEETHOVEN	Concerto No. 2, Op. 19	July 9, 1965	4
BEETHOVEN	Concerto No. 2, Op. 19	unspecified	6
BEETHOVEN	Concerto No. 3, Op. 37	August 4, 1967	15
BEETHOVEN	Rondo, Op. 51 No. 1	April 16, 1975	13
BEETHOVEN	Rondo, Op. 51 No. 1	unspecified	19
BEETHOVEN	Rondo a capriccio, Op. 129	unspecified	19
BEETHOVEN	Sonata No. 3, Op. 2 No. 3	April 16, 1975	13
BEETHOVEN	Sonata, Op. 2 No. 3 (1st mvt)	April 16, 1975	13A
BEETHOVEN	Sonata No. 3, Op. 2 No. 3	July 1977	8
BEETHOVEN	Sonata No. 26, Op. 81a	March 28, 1962	1
BEETHOVEN	Sonata No. 26, Op. 81a	May 13, 1966	3
BEETHOVEN	Triple Concerto	unspecified	18
BEETHOVEN	Variations on "God Save the King" excerpt	(unspecified)	4
BEETHOVEN	Variations on "Rule Brittania"	May 17, 1967	2
BEETHOVEN	Variations for Cello and Piano (Olefsky):		
	7 Variations from "The Magic Flute"	unspecified	12
	12 Variations from "The Magic Flute"	unspecified	12
	6 Variations from "Judas Maccabeas"	unspecified	12
BRAHMS	Concerto No. 2, Op. 83	June 20, 1980	7
BRAHMS	Rhapsody, Op. 79 No. 2	May 13, 1966	3
BRAHMS	Rhapsody, Op. 119 No. 4	May 13, 1966	3
BRAHMS	Handel Variations, Op. 24	December 1, 1976	9A
CHOPIN	Ballades 1, 2, 3	July 1977	8A
CHOPIN	Ballade No. 1, Op. 23	May 13, 1966	3
CHOPIN	Ballade No. 1, Op. 23	excerpt (unspecified)	4
CHOPIN	Ballade No. 4, Op. 52	May 17, 1967	2A
CHOPIN	Ballade No. 4, Op. 52	July 1977	14
CHOPIN	Berceuse excerpt	(unspecified)	4
CHOPIN	Fantasy, Op. 49	May 17, 1967	2A
CHOPIN	Fantasy-Impromptu, Op. 66	May 17, 1967	2A
CHOPIN	Fantasy-Impromptu, Op. 66	July 1977	8A
CHOPIN	Impromptu No. 1, Op. 29	May 17, 1967	2A
CHOPIN	Impromptu No. 1, Op. 29	July 1977	8
CHOPIN	Impromptu No. 2, Op. 36	May 17, 1967	2A
CHOPIN	Impromptu No. 2, Op. 36	July 1977	8
CHOPIN	Impromptu No. 3, Op. 51	May 17, 1967	2A
CHOPIN	Impromptu No. 3, Op. 51	July 1977	8A
CHOPIN	Nocturne, Op. 27 No. 2	May 13, 1966	3
CHOPIN	Prelude No. 24	May 13, 1966	3
CHOPIN	Prelude No. 24	December 1, 1976	9A
CHOPIN	Prelude No. 24 excerpt	(unspecified)	4
GERSHWIN	Concerto in F	unspecified	16
HANDEL	Keyboard Suite in B-flat	December 1, 1976	9A
HAYDN	Andante & Variations in F Minor	May 17, 1967	2A
HAYDN	Andante & Variations in F Minor	December 1, 1976	9
HAYDN	Concerto in G	May 3, 1970	5
HUMMEL	Concerto, Op. 89	unspecified	18
Interview with Martin Perlich (WCLV)	unspecified	16	
LISZT	Hungarian Rhapsody No. 2	unspecified	14
LITOLFF	Scherzo	unspecified	18
MENDELSSOHN	Concerto No. 1	unspecified	16
MENDELSSOHN	Scherzo a capriccio	excerpt (unspecified)	4
MENDELSSOHN-LISZT	Wedding March	unspecified	17
MOZART	Concerto No. 24, K. 491	May 3, 1970	5
MOZART	Fantasy, K. 397	March 28, 1962	1
MOZART	Fantasy, K. 397	May 13, 1966	3
MOZART	Rondo, K. 485	May 13, 1966	3
PROKOFIEV	Sonata No. 3, Op. 28	April 16, 1975	13
PROKOFIEV	Toccata, Op. 11	March 28, 1962	1A
PROKOFIEV	Toccata, Op. 11	May 13, 1966	3
PROKOFIEV	Toccata, Op. 11	April 16, 1975	13
RACHMANINOFF	Paganini Rhapsody	unspecified	18
SAINT-SAENS	Wedding Cake, Op. 76	unspecified	17
SCHUBERT	Four Impromptus, Op. 142	March 28, 1962	1A
SCHUBERT	Four Impromptus, Op. 142	April 16, 1975	13A
SCHUBERT	Four Impromptus, Op. 142	December 1, 1976	9
SCHUBERT	Four Impromptus, Op. 142	July 1977	8
SCHUBERT	Impromptus Op. 142, Nos. 3 & 4	May 13, 1966	3
SCHUBERT	Moment Musical No. 3	May 13, 1966	3
SCHUBERT	Moment Musical No. 3	April 16, 1975	13A
SCHUBERT	Sonata, Op.143	unspecified	14
SCHUMANN	Sonata, Op. 22	May 17, 1967	2
SOLER	Two Sonatas in C Minor	unspecified	17
TCHAIKOVSKY	Concerto No. 1	1969	15
TCHAIKOVSKY	Concerto No. 1 excerpt	(unspecified)	4
TCHAIKOVSKY	Concerto No. 1	unspecified	10
WHITTAKER	Piano Sonata	unspecified	14
YARDUMIAN	Chromatic Sonata	May 17, 1967	2
