= Clarksville Cave =

Cave in Albany County, New York

Coordinates: 42°34′38″N 73°57′51″W

Clarksville Cave is a cave in Clarksville, Albany County, New York.

Clarksville Cave is a horizontal cave system with 4,800 feet (1,500 m) of passage and three entrances.

== History ==
The history of Clarksville Cave is one of the longest of any cave in New York. The earliest known petroglyph found in the cave is from 1811, and a letter describing the cave was written by Teunis Houghtaling in 1818.
