= Onesquethaw Valley Historic District =

Historic district in New York, United States

- U.S. National Register of Historic Places
- U.S. Historic district
- Location within New York Location within the United States
- Nearest city: About 10 mi. SW of Albany off NY 43; principally at New Scotland, New York
- Coordinates: 42°33′20″N 73°54′15″W
- Area: 3,410 acres (1,380 ha)
- Architectural style: Greek Revival
- NRHP reference No.: 74001216
- Added to NRHP: January 17, 1974

Onesquethaw Valley Historic District is a national historic district principally located at New Scotland in Albany County, New York. It includes 25 contributing buildings and three contributing archaeological sites. In encompasses farmsteads and sites in part of the valley of Onesquethaw Creek, a tributary of Coeymans Creek. Most notable are eight 18th-century stone houses. The archaeological sites are a grist mill site, sawmill site, and a prehistoric Indian site.

It was listed on the National Register of Historic Places in 1974.

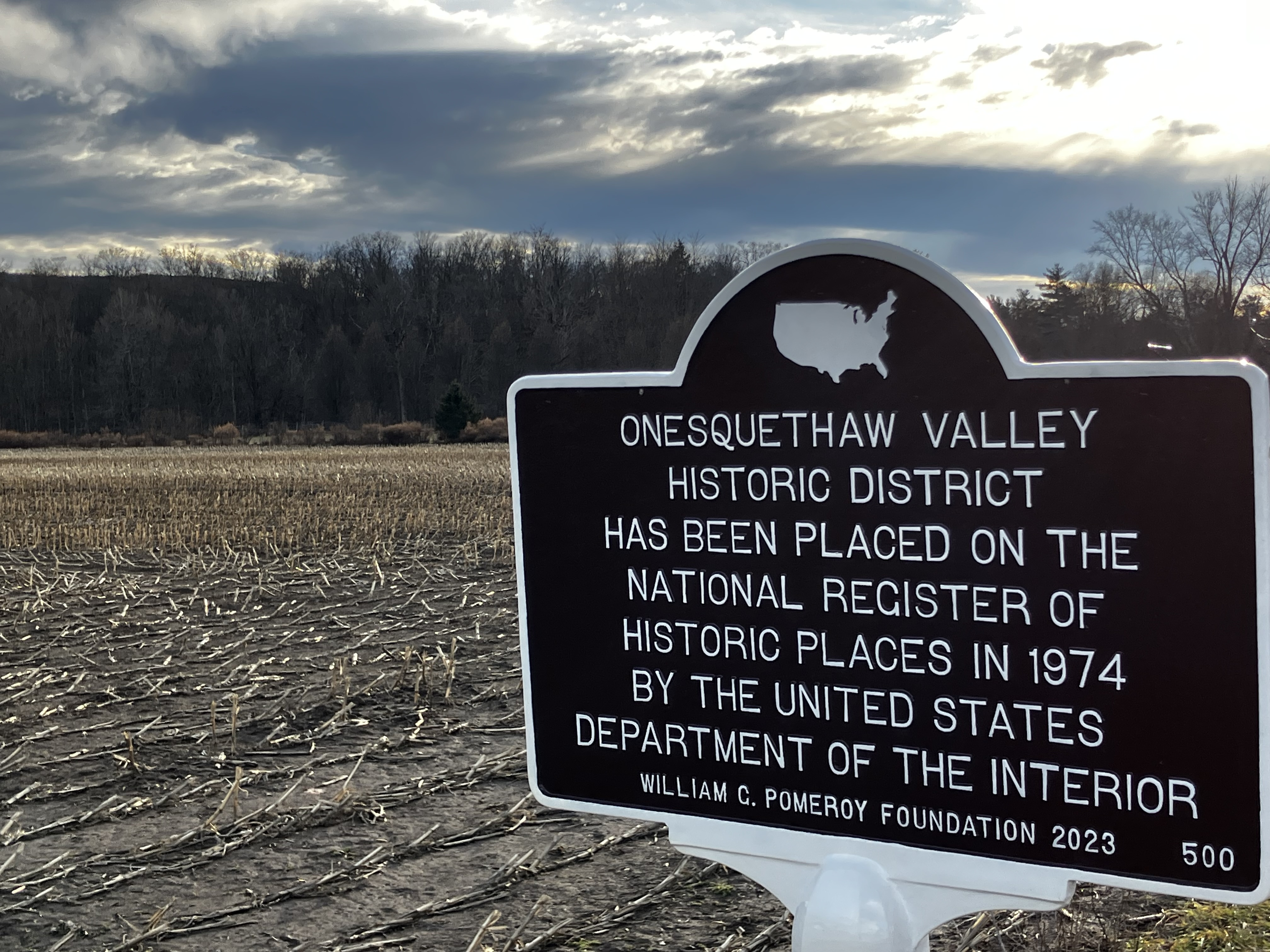
Onesquethaw Valley Historic District, New York
