= National Music League =

American arts organization

The National Music League (NML) was an American arts organization based in New York City that was active during the 1920s through the 1960s. Founded as a non-profit institution in June 1925, the organization was dedicated to supporting and furthering the careers of talented young American classical musicians. While its goals remained the same, the organization became a for-profit incorporated institution in 1938. Robert E. Simon served as the organizations president for many years and Léon Barzin served as vice president. The organization ceased operations in the early 1960s.

The NML selected artists to support through annual competitive music auditions. Judges for the competition were leading musicians and teachers in the New York area, often pulling from faculty members at the Juilliard School and Manhattan School of Music. The only requirement to compete was that the artist be under the age of 30. Winners of the competition were then awarded by having a concert series organized and promoted for them by the NML, thereby helping them to gain wider public recognition. Artists who were supported by the NML included Josephine Antoine, Frances Blaisdell, Jean Carlton, Risë Stevens, Thomas Llyfnwy Thomas, and Maria Montana, among many others.

In 1935 the NML presented a production of Engelbert Humperdinck's Hänsel und Gretel at the White House after a luncheon hosted by Eleanor Roosevelt. The cast notably included bass John Gurney of later Metropolitan Opera fame as Peter.

Beginning in 1950 the NML began a partnership with the Jeunesses Musicales International in France which resulted in an annual foreign-exchange of artists. The program would allow an American musician the opportunity to do a concert tour throughout France and a French artist a United States tour. American musicians to have participated in the exchange program to France included Sidney Harth (1951-1952), Theodore Lettvin (1951-1952), Lillian Kallir (1953), James Wolfe (1954), Shirlee Emmons (1954), and Betty Allen (1955) among others. French artists in the program included Pierre Sancan (1951-1952), Philippe Entremont (1953, 1955), and Blanche Tarjus (1954) among others. The exchange program expanded in 1953 to include artists from Brazil, beginning with Brazilian pianist Oriano de Almeida in 1954 and Brazilian soprano Edmée Brandi in exchange for American soprano Shirlee Emmons (1953) and violinist Joyce Flissler (1955). The Gioventù Musicale d'Italia began exchanging artists with the organization in 1955, as did the government of Mexico.
