= Bennett Hill Farm =

Historic house in New York, United States

- U.S. National Register of Historic Places
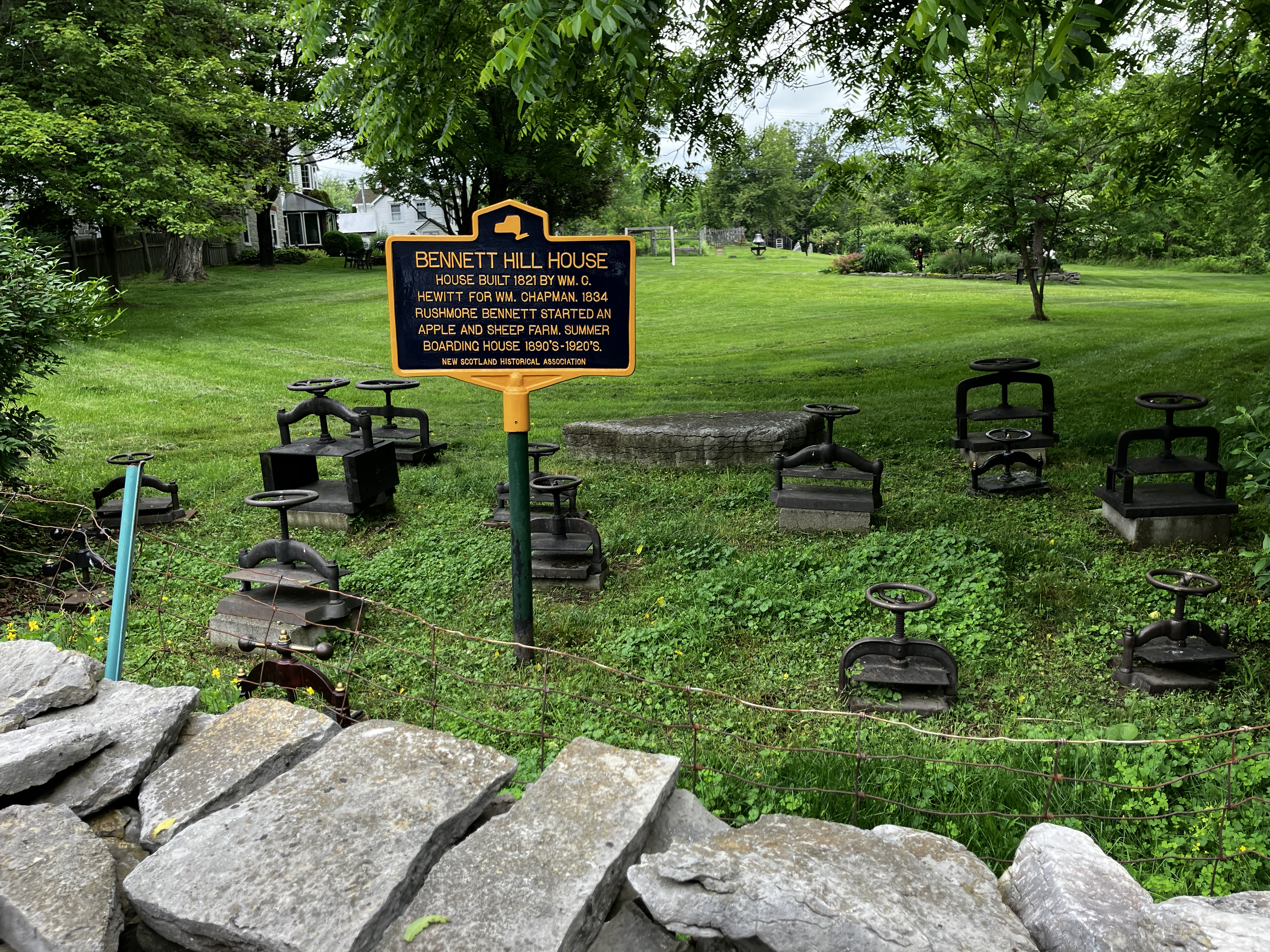

- Location within New York Location within the United States
- Location: Bennett Hill Rd. at Rowe Rd., New Scotland, New York
- Coordinates: 42°34′13″N 73°57′22″W
- Area: 30 acres (12 ha)
- Built: 1797
- Architectural style: Greek Revival
- NRHP reference No.: 03001241
- Added to NRHP: December 5, 2003

Bennett Hill Farm is a historic home and farm complex located at New Scotland in Albany County, New York. The original section of the main house was built in 1821 and is a three-by-two-bay, 2 1/2-story dwelling. In the 1830s, a large Greek Revival style 2 1/2-story, three- by two-bay addition was completed. Contributing farm buildings include the main barn (1797), animal barn (c. 1900), wagon shed (c. 1900), fruit barn (c. 1900), smoke house (c. 1810), and tenant house (c. 1890).

It was listed on the National Register of Historic Places in 2003.
