= Presbyterian Church in New Scotland and the New Scotland Cemetery =

Historic site in Albany County, New York

- U.S. National Register of Historic Places
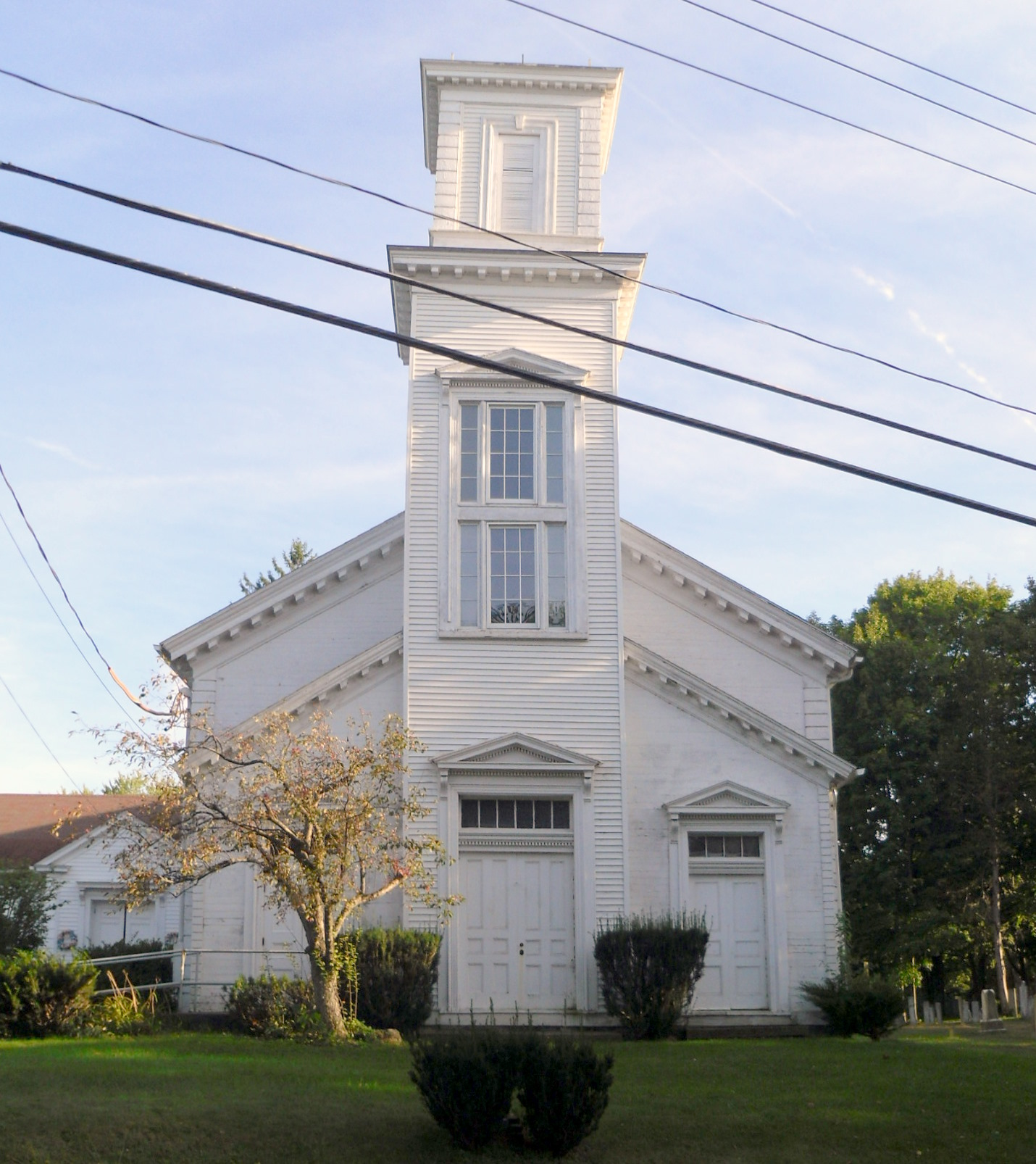
- Presbyterian Church in New Scotland, September 2010

- Location within New York Location within the United States
- Location: 2010 New Scotland Rd. and 478 New Scotland Rd. S., New Scotland, New York
- Coordinates: 42°37′53″N 73°54′22″W
- Area: 7.4 acres (3.0 ha)
- Website: newscotlandpc.com
- NRHP reference No.: 10000592
- Added to NRHP: August 29, 2010

Presbyterian Church in New Scotland and the New Scotland Cemetery is a historic Presbyterian church and cemetery located in New Scotland in Albany County, New York. The church was built in 1849 and extended in 1868. It is a 2-story, three-bay-wide, rectangular frame structure with a 1 1/2-story front projecting vestibule / entrance block. It features a large, two-stage square central projecting tower. The education wing was completed in 1957. The cemetery includes about 500 burials dating from the 18th to 20th century. The congregation was founded in 1787 and the present structure is its second building.

It was listed on the National Register of Historic Places in 2010.
