= Sidney Harth =

American violinist and conductor

Sidney Harth (October 5, 1925, in Cleveland – February 15, 2011, in Pittsburgh) was an American violinist and conductor.

== Education ==
Harth was born in Cleveland, Ohio. He graduated from the Cleveland Institute of Music and studied with Joseph Fuchs, Joseph Knitzer, Mishel Boris Piastro and George Enescu. Subsequently, he held faculty positions at University of Louisville, the University of Houston, the University of Texas, Yale University, and the Mannes College of Music.

== Career ==
In 1948, Mr. Harth was a winner of the Walter W. Naumburg Violin Award. He made his European debut touring France with pianist Theodore Lettvin in 1951–1952 in a concert series organized by the National Music League and the Jeunesses Musicales International. Harth performed with major orchestras across the world, and made numerous recordings with the Chicago Symphony Orchestra and the Kraków Radio and Television Orchestra.

In 1973 & 1975, he was a soloist with the Naumburg Orchestral Concerts, in the Naumburg Bandshell, Central Park, in the summer series.

He was concertmaster of the New York Philharmonic Orchestra and Chicago Symphony Orchestra, principal concertmaster and associate conductor of the Los Angeles Philharmonic Orchestra, and concertmaster and assistant conductor of the Louisville Orchestra. An acclaimed conductor, Harth was during his career principal conductor of the Natal Philharmonic Orchestra in South Africa, and musical director of the Jerusalem Symphony Orchestra, Northwest Chamber Orchestra of Seattle and the Puerto Rico Symphony Orchestra. In 1975, he conducted in the Naumburg Orchestral Concerts, in the Naumburg Bandshell, Central Park, in the summer series.

== Academia ==
Harth was at one time a faculty member of the Yale School of Music. He also was head of the School of Music at Carnegie Mellon University, where he also taught violin and chamber music. Until the time of his death on February 15, 2011, Harth was the director of orchestral activities at Duquesne University Mary Pappert School of Music.

== Awards ==
In 1957 Harth became the first American to receive the Laureate Prize in the Wieniawski Violin Competition held in Poland.

He was initiated as an honorary member of the Zeta Kappa chapter of Phi Mu Alpha Sinfonia fraternity, the national fraternity for men in music, in 1958 and was selected as a National Honorary member of the fraternity in 1966.

== Personal life ==
He married Teresa Testa, a professional Violinist whose appointments included positions with the Louisville Orchestra, the Chicago Lyric Opera, the Los Angeles Philharmonic, and The Principal Second Violin Chair of the Pittsburgh Symphony Orchestra. Married for over sixty years, the couple had two children. Their daughter Laura is a Music Producer and Recording Executive, and their late son Robert was the executive and artistic director of Carnegie Hall.
