= Clarksville, Albany County, New York =

Clarksville, New York
- Hamlet
- Location within New York Location within the United States
- Coordinates: 42°34′33″N 73°57′50″W
- Country: United States
- State: New York
- County: Albany
- Town: New Scotland

Area
  - Total: 2.7 sq mi (7 km^{2})
- Elevation: 663 ft (202 m)

Population (2014)
  - Total: 153
  - Density: 57/sq mi (21.9/km^{2})
- Time zone: UTC-5 (Eastern (EST))
  - Summer (DST): UTC-4 (EDT)
- ZIP Code: 12041
- Area code: 518
- GNIS feature ID: 946794
- FIPS code: 36-15979
- Formerly: West Bethlehem

Clarksville is a hamlet in the town of New Scotland, Albany County, New York, United States. It is situated along Delaware Turnpike (New York State Route 443) in the southern part of the town at the foot of the Helderberg Escarpment. It is the site of the Clarksville Cave and has an annual Clarksville Heritage Day and Car Show. It is in the Onesquethaw Volunteer Fire Company fire protection district.

== History ==
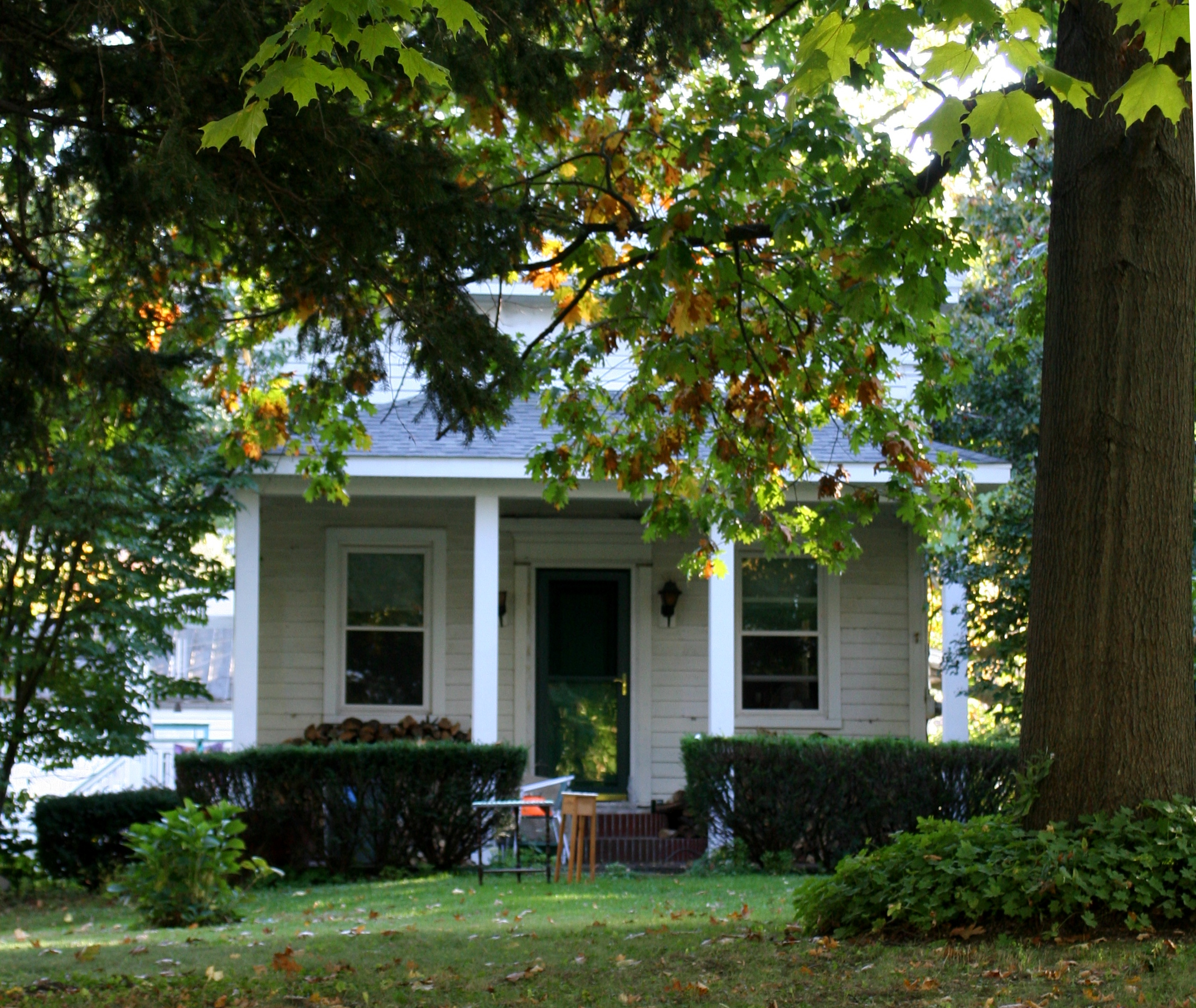
Clark House, built c. 1828 for Adam A. Clark and wife Betsy.

In 1805, the Albany and Delaware Turnpike was constructed through what would later become Clarksville. Since this place was halfway between Albany and Rensselaerville, Clarksville became a popular place for travelers to stop. Several inns, taverns, and other businesses were quickly established. Clarksville was originally the site of the Bethlehem post office, it being a part of that town until the establishment of the town of New Scotland. The post office and hamlet were later named Clarksville for Adam A. Clark, who came to the area in 1822. In 1853, the Reformed Church of Clarksville was established and a church built, and the Methodist church in 1860–1. In 1854, a plank road was built from Clarksville north and east to Feura Bush and Bethlehem Center to connect with the Albany and Bethlehem Turnpike to Albany. Clarksville was once the largest settlement in the town of New Scotland, until the convergence of railroads in Voorheesville in the late 19th century led to a boom in the north part of town.

== Geography ==
Clarksville is situated in the southern portion of the town of New Scotland, along Delaware Turnpike (New York State Route 443) east of and at the foot of the Helderberg Escarpment. Albany County Route 301 leads south to Tarrytown, Route 443 leads east to Unionville and west to the town of Berne. The Onesquethaw Creek flows east along the south side of Route 443. The Clarksville ZIP Code (12041) is roughly a triangle with Stove Pipe Road on the western side and Upper Flat Rock Road as the eastern side. Bennett Hill Road and Plank Road are approximately the southern base of the triangle. Bennett Hill, 400 feet higher than the hamlet, towers over it to the south and west. The top of the hill is a plateau at an average height of 1120 feet above sea level, with the highest point being 1135 feet. The hill is part of a wilderness preserve owned by the Mohawk Hudson Land Conservancy.

Clarksville Cave has three entrances and 4,800 feet of passages. Owned by the Northeastern Cave Conservancy Inc. and open to the public, the cave is the most actively used noncommercial cave system in the United States. First discovered in the 19th century, access was unrestricted until 2004, when the conservancy purchased two of the three entrances and began regulating access.

== Culture ==
Clarksville celebrates annually the Clarksville Heritage Day and Car Show the first Saturday every August. It is sponsored by the Clarksville Historical Society.

== Education ==
Clarksville is a part of the Bethlehem Central School District (BCSD) and the children attend either Slingerlands or Eagle Elementary Schools for kindergarten through fifth grade; and Bethlehem Central Middle School and Bethlehem Central High School for sixth through twelfth.

== Historic structures ==
- Clarksville Elementary School is listed on the National Register of Historic Places. The school was closed after the 2010–11 school year. It is currently home to the Albany County Sheriff's Uniform Patrol Division.

== Notable person ==
- Edwin Corning Jr., son of Edwin Corning, brother of Erastus Corning 2nd, member of the New York State Assembly.
