= Onesquethaw Creek =

Onesquethaw Creek Onesquethaw Creek, Oniskethau Kil
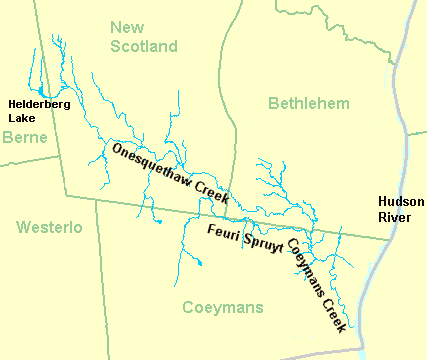
- Onesquethaw and Coeymans Creeks
- Native name: O-nis-ke-thau

Location
- Country: United States
- State: New York

Physical characteristics
- Source
  - location: New Scotland, New York
  - coordinates: 42°37′06″N 73°59′35″W
- Mouth: Coeymans Creek
  - location: Bethlehem, New York
  - coordinates: 42°32′19″N 73°49′40″W
  - elevation: 118 ft (36 m)

Onesquethaw Creek is a 14.5-mile-long (23.3 km) creek in Albany County, New York. It is a tributary of the Hudson River. It rises in the town of New Scotland, to the west of the hamlet of New Salem, in the Helderberg Mountains, and flows to Coeymans Creek in the town of Bethlehem, southwest of Delmar.

== History ==
O-nis'-kwe-thau Creek was also called Coeymans Creek, which continues to be the name of Onesquethaw Creek's outlet stream. There was a hamlet of this name, also known as Oniskethau (now called Tarrytown) in New Scotland, as well as Oniskethau flats and mountain now named Bennet Hill. It is said to have been an early Native American name meaning cornfields but this attribution was mistakenly based on William Martin Beauchamp's lack of personal knowledge of the Ma-quaes [Mohawks] language because it seemed similar to the Mahican word for maze. The Mahicans originally owned the land before it was lost to the Ma-quaes [Mohawks] during the Beaver Wars of 1628. The land was deeded to Teunis Slingerland and Johannes Apple by representatives of the three races (clans of the Ma-quaes [Mohawks] (Wolf, Bear and Turtle), owners of the land called "O-nits-quat-haa." as indicated on the original Slingerlands Land Patent Agreement. The name when translated from the Ma-quaes [Mohawk] language simply means: "Sinking-Stream." This name is much more in keeping with the actual topography of the land.

According to a document from the New Scotland Historical Association, the word Onesquethaw has three meanings: Corn Field, Stoney Bottom, and Crooked Creek. The New Scotland Historical Association describes that the first European colonizer on Onesquethaw Creek flats was from Holland, Teunis Slingerland. He purchased 10,000 acres of land from the Indians around 1660. "The bargain was struck for one piece of shrift, three casks of rum, three kettles, three shirts, one hundred and fifty hands of wampum, and one bag of powder. The original deed of 1685, which is on file in the Albany County Courthouse, bears the Indian clan signs of the Wolf, Bear and Turtle."

The history of the Mahican (Mohican) people, and of the land surrounding the Onesquethaw Creek, was described in 1854, by John Wannuacon Quinney. Quinney, "was invited to make a Fourth of July address in Reidsville, between Clarksville and South Berne. His tribe, the Mohicans, had fought with the patriots in the American revolution, helping to defeat England. Quinney noted that he was standing on what should have been the property of his tribe and asked, 'Where are the 25,000 in number and the 4,000 warriors who constituted the power and population of the great Muh-he-con-ne-ok Nation in 1604?' He noted the two-and-a-half-century decline of his tribe and said, 'Nothing that deserved the name of ‘purchase’ was ever made ... Let it not surprise you, my friends, when I say that the spot on which we stand has never been purchased or rightly obtained, and that by justice, human and divine, it is the property now of the remnant of that great people from whom I am descended. 'They left it in the tortures of starvation and to improve their miserable existence ... For myself and my tribe I ask for justice. I believe it will sooner or later occur. And may the Great and Good Spirit enable me to die in hope.'"

== See also ==
- List of rivers of New York
- Onesquethaw Valley Historic District
