= New Scotland, New York =

- Town
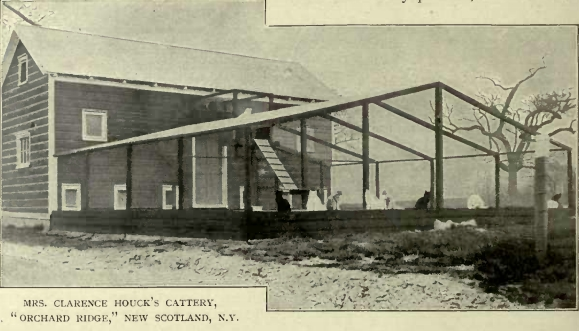
- Clarence Houck's Cattery - New Scotland, NY

- Seal

- Location in Albany County and the state of New York.
- Coordinates: 42°37′16″N 73°56′6″W
- Country: United States
- State: New York
- County: Albany
- Incorporated: 1832

Government
  - Type: Town Council
  - Supervisor: Douglas LaGrange (D)
  - Town Council: Members' List: • William Hennessy, Jr.; • Daniel Leinung; • Adam Greenberg; • Bridgit Burke

Area
  - Total: 57.97 sq mi (150.14 km^{2})
  - Land: 57.50 sq mi (148.92 km^{2})
  - Water: 0.47 sq mi (1.21 km^{2})
- Elevation: 666 ft (203 m)

Population (2020)
  - Total: 9,096
  - Estimate (2016): 8,760
- Time zone: UTC-5 (Eastern (EST))
  - Summer (DST): UTC-4 (EDT)
- ZIP Codes: 12041 (Clarksville); 12067 (Feura Bush); 12186 (Voorheesville); 12009 (Altamont); 12054 (Delmar); 12158 (Selkirk); 12159 (Slingerlands); 12203 (Albany)
- FIPS code: 36-001-50672
- GNIS feature ID: 0979272
- Website: www.townofnewscotland.gov

New Scotland is a town in Albany County, New York, United States. The population was 9,096 at the 2020 census.

The town is southwest of Albany, New York, the state capital. New Scotland is centrally located in the county.

== History ==
The town was settled around 1660. New Scotland was founded in 1832 from the west part of the town of Bethlehem.

The Bennett Hill Farm, Presbyterian Church in New Scotland and the New Scotland Cemetery, and Onesquethaw Valley Historic District are listed on the National Register of Historic Places.

== Geography ==
According to the United States Census Bureau, the town has a total area of 58.4 square miles (151 km^{2}), of which 58.1 square miles (150 km^{2}) is land and 0.3 square miles (0.78 km^{2}) (0.57%) is water.

== Demographics ==
Historical population
Census	Pop.	Note	%±
1840	2,912		—
1850	3,459		18.8%
1860	3,304		−4.5%
1870	3,411		3.2%
1880	3,251		−4.7%
1890	3,207		−1.4%
1900	3,058		−4.6%
1910	2,834		−7.3%
1920	2,470		−12.8%
1930	2,841		15.0%
1940	3,302		16.2%
1950	3,956		19.8%
1960	5,818		47.1%
1970	8,481		45.8%
1980	8,976		5.8%
1990	9,139		1.8%
2000	8,626		−5.6%
2010	8,648		0.3%
2020	9,096		5.2%
U.S. Decennial Census

As of the census of 2000, there were 8,626 people, 3,341 households, and 2,509 families residing in the town. The population density was 148.6 inhabitants per square mile (57.4/km^{2}). There were 3,470 housing units at an average density of 59.8 per square mile (23.1/km^{2}). The racial makeup of the town was 98.17% White, 0.28% African American, 0.20% Native American, 0.50% Asian, 0.20% from other races, and 0.66% from two or more races. Hispanic or Latino of any race were 0.87% of the population.

There were 3,341 households, out of which 33.7% had children under the age of 18 living with them, 62.6% were married couples living together, 9.4% had a female householder with no husband present, and 24.9% were non-families. 20.1% of all households were made up of individuals, and 7.2% had someone living alone who was 65 years of age or older. The average household size was 2.58 and the average family size was 2.98.

In the town, the population was spread out, with 24.9% under the age of 18, 5.7% from 18 to 24, 26.6% from 25 to 44, 29.6% from 45 to 64, and 13.2% who were 65 years of age or older. The median age was 41 years. For every 100 females, there were 95.8 males. For every 100 females age 18 and over, there were 93.4 males.

The median income for a household in the town was $58,956, and the median income for a family was $65,753. Males had a median income of $44,138 versus $33,941 for females. The per capita income for the town was $29,231. About 2.5% of families and 4.1% of the population were below the poverty line, including 4.6% of those under age 18 and 4.0% of those age 65 or over.

== Communities and locations in New Scotland ==
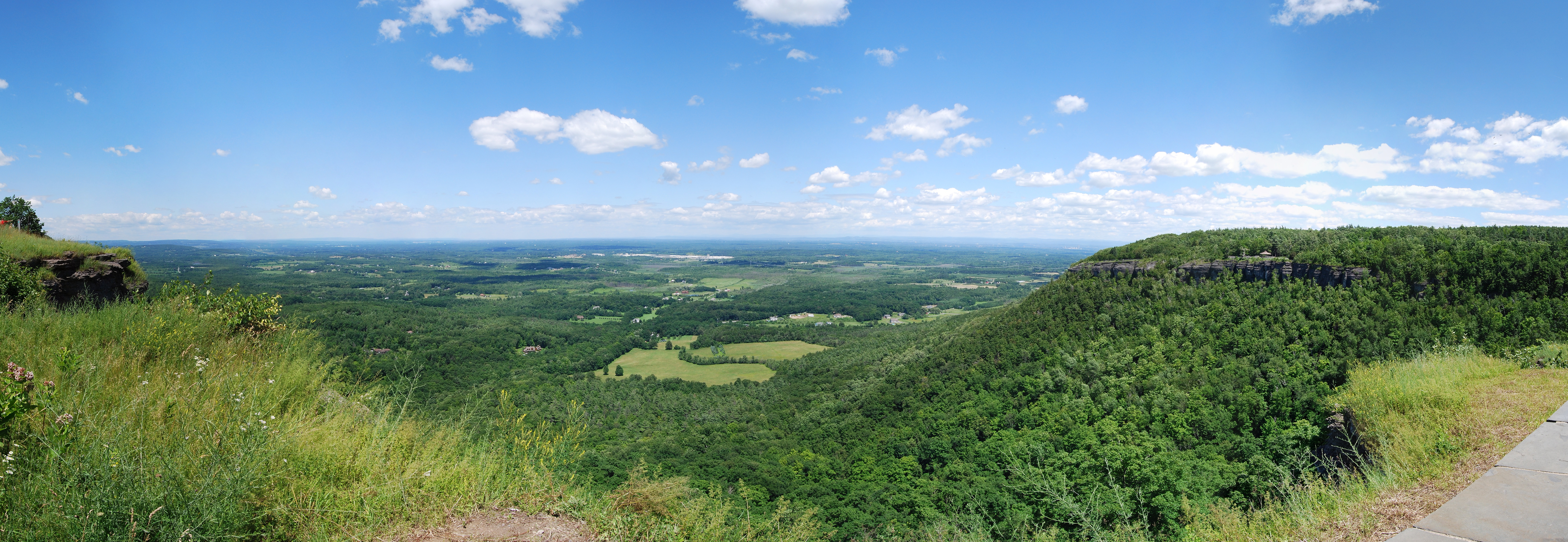
View of New Scotland and Bethlehem from Thacher Park

- Camp Pinnacle – A location in the northwestern part of the town.
- Clarksville – A hamlet in the southwestern part of the town on Route 443.
- Feura Bush – A hamlet in the southeastern section of the town, south of Unionville on County Rt. 32.
- Meads Corner – A location southeast of Clarksville.
- New Salem – A hamlet west of New Scotland hamlet.
- New Scotland – The hamlet of New Scotland is south of Voorheesville.
- Tarrytown (also Onesquethaw or Oniskethau, near Onesquethaw Creek) – A hamlet south of Clarksville.
- Unionville – A hamlet by the eastern town line with Bethlehem
- Vly Creek Reservoir – A reservoir south of New Salem, now owned by the Town of Bethlehem.
- Voorheesville – An incorporated village in the northern part of the town.
- Wolf Hill – A hamlet at the western town line.

== Town Board ==
- Supervisor, Douglas LaGrange, Term to: December 31, 2025
- Councilperson, Daniel Leinung, Term to: December 31, 2025
- Councilperson, Adam Greenberg, Term to: December 31, 2025
- Councilperson, Bridget Burke, Term to: December 31, 2027
- Councilperson, William Hennessy, Jr., Term to: December 31, 2027
