= Statendam (ship) =

A number of ships of the Holland America Line have been named Statendam, the name of an old dike on the island of Goeree-Overflakkee:

- SS Statendam (1898) was an ocean liner launched in 1898, sold to the Allan Line in 1911, and renamed Scotian.
- SS Statendam (1914) was an ocean liner launched in 1914, but completed in 1917 as White Star Line's SS Justicia.
- SS Statendam (1924) was an ocean liner launched in 1924, completed in 1929, and destroyed by fire in 1940.
- SS Statendam (1956) was a cruise ship launched in 1956. She was sold in 1982 and renamed Rhapsody, and then Regent Star. She was named Sea Harmony and finally Harmony I in 2004, and scrapped later that year.
- MS Statendam is a cruise ship that entered service in 1993
- MS Nieuw Statendam is a cruise ship that entered service in December 2018, the second Holland America Pinnacle-class ship.
