= Temple Anshe Amunim (Pittsfield, Massachusetts) =

Reform synagogue and Jewish congregation in Pittsfield, Massachusetts, US

- Hebrew: אנשי אמונים
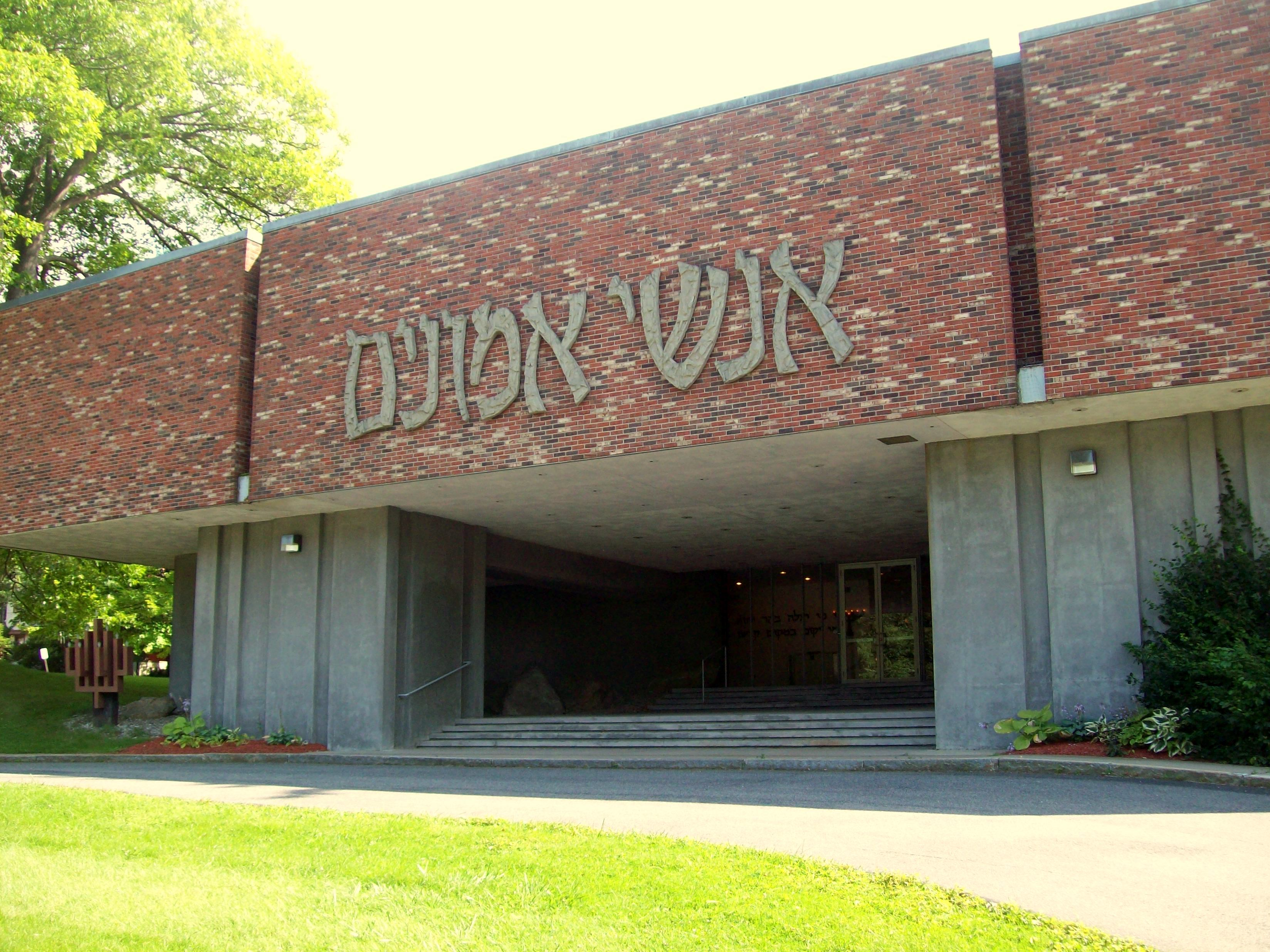
- Temple façade

- Location in Massachusetts

Religion
- Affiliation: Reform Judaism
- Ecclesiastical or organisational status: Synagogue
- Leadership: Rabbi Valerie Lieber
- Status: Active

Location
- Location: 26 Broad Street, Pittsfield, Berkshire County, Massachusetts
- Country: United States
- Coordinates: 42°26′31″N 73°15′15″W

Architecture
- Architect: Henry L. Blatner
- Type: Synagogue
- Style: Modernist
- Established: 1869 (as a congregation)
- Completed: 1927 (Fern Street); 1964 (Broad Street)

Specifications
- Capacity: 280 worshippers
- Dome: One

Website
- ansheamunim.org

Temple Anshe Amunim (Hebrew: אנשי אמונים, lit. 'People of Faith') is a Reform Jewish congregation and synagogue located at 26 Broad Street, in Pittsfield, Berkshire County, Massachusetts, in the United States. The congregation was founded by German Jewish immigrants in 1869 as Orthodox, and adopted Reform practice in 1879. It is the second-oldest Reform congregation in the United States and its temple is the oldest synagogue building in Western Massachusetts. In 1904, Anshe Amunim joined the Union of American Hebrew Congregations. It is also affiliated with the Jewish Federation of the Berkshires.

== History ==
A group of around 40 German Jewish immigrant families established Society Anshe Amunim in Pittsfield, Massachusetts in November 1869. The congregation originally subscribed to Orthodox Judaism, but by 1879 had realigned itself with Reform practice.

The congregation first convened in private homes and later rented space for its activities, including a building owned by founding member Moses England at Fern and North Streets. In 1927 the congregation purchased an Adventist church building on the corner of Fern and Willis Streets and redesigned it as a temple. In 1959 the England-Blau families gifted to the temple a property at Broad Street and Wendell Avenue for the construction of a new edifice. The new temple building was completed in the summer of 1964 and formally dedicated in 1965.

== Architecture ==
The block-like temple building, designed by architect Henry L. Blatner in the Modernist style, stands atop a graded slope. The entrance is fronted by two bulky stone pillars. The effect for arriving worshippers, Blatner said, is to "symbolize the journey of Moses up Mount Sinai to receive the Tablets of the Law".

The 280-seat sanctuary is topped by a circular dome which affords a view of the sky. The Ark was sculpted by Emanuel Milstein. Other facilities include a chapel, library, and ten classrooms. Among the interior decorations are several boldly colored oil paintings by American painter Mark Milloff, which he donated in memory of his mother.

The Journal of Israeli Architecture cited the temple building as "one of the eight synagogues of the world". The design won two awards from the American Institute of Architecture in 1964 and has featured in several books.

== Programming ==
The temple's Hebrew Ladies Benevolent Society was established in 1882; it would later become the Women for Reform Judaism. The temple's Men's Club was established in 1932.

In 1887, the temple's Sunday School program was developed; it would evolve into the modern-day Religious School program. Anshe Amunim also operates a Youth Group for teens in eighth through twelfth grade.

Anshe Amunim hosts the annual Hilda Vallin Feigenbaum Lecture Series, established in 1967 by Dr. Armand Feigenbaum and Dr. Donald Feigenbaum in honor of their mother. This lecture has featured prominent speakers such as author Isaac Bashevis Singer, politicians Barney Frank, Julian Bond, and Howard Dean, and journalists Sander Vanocur and Bernard Kalb. After Donald Feigenbaum died in March 2013, the Feigenbaum Foundation created a $1 million endowment to keep the lecture series going in perpetuity. At the same time, the Foundation gifted a second $1 million endowment to contribute to the salary of the temple's rabbi.

Since the 1960s, Anshe Amunim has maintained an interfaith dialogue with the Church on the Hill, a United Church of Christ congregation in neighboring Lenox. Rabbis and priests have spoken at each other's pulpits and joined each other on missions to Israel. In 2013, when Thanksgiving and the first day of Hanukkah fell on the same secular date, the church invited Rabbi Joshua Breindel of Anshe Amunim to light the Hanukkah menorah at the church's Thanksgiving dinner. Rabbi David Weiner of Congregation Knesset Israel of Pittsfield also participated. On Martin Luther King Jr. Day, January 15, 2016, Breindel and Pastor Sheila Sholes-Ross of the First Baptist Church of Pittsfield conducted a joint worship service.

== Rabbinic leadership ==
Rabbi Harry Kaplan, a graduate of the Jewish Institute of Religion, assumed the pulpit of Anshe Amunim from 1926 to 1935. Rabbi Perry Nussbaum was the temple's spiritual leader from 1949 to 1954. Rabbi Harold I. Salzman served as senior rabbi from 1954 to 1984; he served as Rabbi Emeritus from 2017 until his passing in 2018. Rabbi Barbara Kipnis Cohen was the temple's spiritual leader from 1994 to 2005; she was also the Director of Religious Education. Rabbi Joshua Breindel, a graduate of Hebrew College in Newton, Massachusetts, served as the Temple's rabbi from 2009 to 2018.

== See also ==
- History of the Jews in the United States
