= Feura Bush, New York =

- Hamlet
- Etymology: From Dutch vurenbosch meaning fir woods
- Location within New York Location within the United States
- Coordinates: 42°35′N 73°53′W
- Country: United States
- State: New York
- Region: Capital District
- County: Albany
- Town: New Scotland
- Elevation: 266 ft (81 m)
- Time zone: UTC-5 (EST)
  - Summer (DST): UTC-4 (EDT)
- ZIP Code: 12067
- Area code: 518

Feura Bush is a hamlet in the town of New Scotland, Albany County, New York, United States. It is in the southeastern corner of the town, along the Bethlehem town-line, eight miles south of Albany. The Feura Bush ZIP Code (12067) includes parts of the town of Bethlehem. It is in the Onesquethaw Volunteer Fire Company fire protection district. The 2020 Census showed 28 employer establishments in the hamlet.

== History ==
Feura Bush was originally called "Moaksville", after an early family in the vicinity, and later called Jerusalem after the Jerusalem Reformed Church. Harmon Van Der Zee was a major landowner in the area during the mid-18th century. At that time, Jerusalem was a part of the town of Bethlehem; in 1832, New Scotland was erected as a separate town. In 1790, the Jerusalem Dutch Reformed Church was established halfway between Union (Unionville) and Jerusalem (Feura Bush). This was the first church in the area immediately south of Albany. In 1825, the church was moved to Jerusalem.

In the 1920s, part of the Van Der Zee homestead over the town-line in Bethlehem was taken for the West Shore Railroad's Selkirk rail yard. The yard was originally referred to as being in Feura Bush, being closer to this hamlet than to Selkirk; however, it is located in the Selkirk ZIP Code. In 1854, a plank road was established to run through Feura Bush to Houcks Corners, this section is today New York State Route 32; and then from the corners to Bethlehem Center, which today is New York State Route 910A. This road was also made an official post road by the US Congress.

The Feura Bush School (Bethlehem School District Number 5) was a one-room schoolhouse built in 1885. In 1929, the school was abandoned, and was put to different uses over time until 1987, when the Feura Bush Neighborhood Association converted it to a library. In 1929, a large brick school for kindergarten through eighth grade was built replacing the one-room schoolhouse. This building would be in service until circa 1950. The West Shore Railroad established a station here in approximately 1870 and it was used to ferry students to Ravena for high school. Around 1940, the station was discontinued.

The Jerusalem (later Feura Bush) post office was once located in the Mathias Store until it moved to the hamlet's hotel in 1946, when the store was sold and converted into a residence. A new post office was built in 1989.

== Geography ==
Feura Bush is situated along Indian Fields Road (New York Route 32) at the town border with neighboring Delmar and extends to other borders with Clarksville, Voorheesville, New Salem, South Bethlehem, and Coeymans.

== Architecture ==
The hamlet has mostly Victorian and Colonial residences with some modern styles as well. Several are historic buildings from the mid-18th century.

== Education ==
The majority of Feura Bush is part of the Ravena-Coeymans-Selkirk Central School District (R-C-S). Children attend A.W. Becker Elementary School for kindergarten through fifth grade, R-C-S Middle School for sixth through eighth grade, and R-C-S High for ninth through twelfth grade. Small pockets of the hamlet are within the Bethlehem Central School District. Feura Bush also has a library, situated in a former one-room schoolhouse adjacent to Jerusalem Reformed Church.
