= Kenwood, Albany, New York =

Kenwood
- Hamlet
- Location of Kenwood within the state of New York
- Coordinates: 42°37′35″N 73°46′08″W
- Country: United States
- State: New York
- Region: Capital District
- County: Albany
- Settled: 1618
- Elevation: 32.8 ft (10.0 m)
- Time zone: UTC-5 (EST)
  - Summer (DST): UTC-4 (EDT)
- ZIP Code: 12209
- Area code: 518

Kenwood was a hamlet in the Town of Bethlehem, New York. The hamlet spanned both sides of the Normans Kill near the area where the Normans Kill flows into the Hudson River. In 1870, and again in 1910, northern portions of Kenwood were annexed by the City of Albany, New York.

== History ==
Kenwood, formerly known as Lower Hollow or Rensselaer's Mills, dates to the earliest Dutch settlement in the area that became known as New York's Capital District. In 1618, the Dutch built a fort along a creek that the native inhabitants called Tawasentha. This fort replaced a 1614 fort on Castle Island that had been lost due to an annual freshet that occurred along the Hudson River. In 1637, Albert Bradt built a mill there. From Norway, Bradt was nicknamed "the Norman", and the Tawasentha was renamed Normans Kill after him.

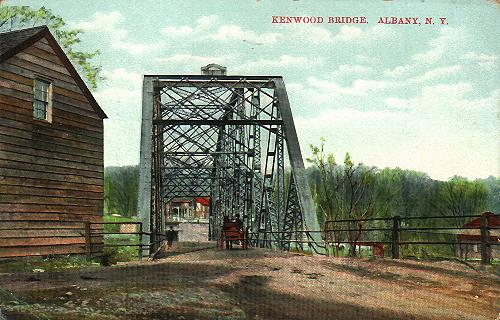
Bridge over Normans Kill along the Albany and Bethlehem Turnpike; 1908

The area known as the Lower Hollow, which later became the hamlet of Kenwood, was part of the Manor of Rensselaerswyck. The Patroon Van Rensselaer had various mills built here after the US Revolutionary War. In 1804, the Albany and Bethlehem Turnpike Company was organized by the state of New York to construct a turnpike road from Albany at South Pearl Street through Lower Hollow, after which the turnpike split with an upper fork to Babcocks Corners (later Bethlehem Center) and a lower fork to The Abbey (later Glenmont). Robert Van Rensselaer lived in a house on the turnpike near the bridge that carried the road over the Normans Kill. (The Upper Hollow, later known as Normansville, was located upstream along the Normans Kill.)

Businessman Joel Rathbone bought a 1,200-acre (4.9 km^{2}) densely wooded area and built a grand Gothic mansion in 1841 for his retirement. He named his estate "Kenwood" in honor of a place in his native Scotland, and the surrounding area also became known as Kenwood.

In 1863, the Albany and Susquehanna Railroad opened from Albany through Kenwood on its way to Adams Station (Delmar), Slingerlands and New Scotland, and eventually to Binghamton. At Kenwood was the Kenwood Junction, the meeting place of the West Shore Railroad and the Albany and Susquehanna. The latter would be leased and then purchased by the Delaware and Hudson Railway. It was bought out by the Canadian Pacific Railway (CP) in 1990. In 2000, CP had concerns about the safety of the bridge at Kenwood; soon after that, it abandoned the entire line from Kenwood to Voorheesville.

In 1870, the city of Albany annexed a portion of Kenwood (including the first mile of the turnpike, the toll-gate, and the Rathbone estate). The city was sued (Harriet M. Elmendorf v. The City of Albany) over its right to lay sidewalks along the turnpike (technically private property and not a city road). One issue of the lawsuit was whether the city had authority to levy an assessment upon property in order to cover the cost of the sidewalk, considered an improvement to the private property of the turnpike.

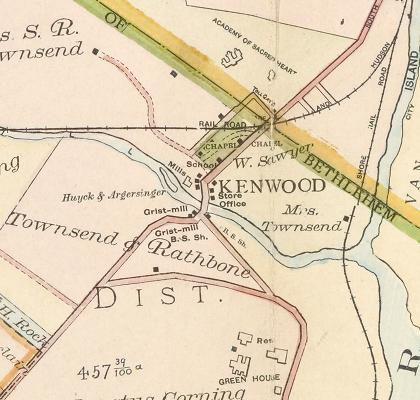
Map of Kenwood in 1891.

In 1886, the hamlet (which included land on both sides of the Normans Kill) included 16 residences, a schoolhouse, a store, a blacksmith, a Baptist church, and 36 families, with a total of 150 persons.

In 1910, the City of Albany annexed the portion of the hamlet of Kenwood lying to the north of the Normans Kill that it had not previously annexed in 1870. Albany annexed much of the land in Bethlehem north of the Normans Kill, thereby making that creek a natural border between the two municipalities. The Bethlehem School District Number 12 school house was on the north bank, and therefore was annexed to Albany; the land south of the creek became part of Bethlehem School District Number 7.

In 1916, Southern Boulevard (US Route 9W), to the northwest of Kenwood, was constructed as a highway to connect Delaware Avenue in Albany to the turnpike at Corning Hill Road in Bethlehem, thereby bypassing Kenwood.

As of February 2020, Kenwood is no longer recognized as a hamlet within the Town of Bethlehem.

=== Kenwood Academy ===
In 1859, the Female Academy of the Sacred Heart (a Catholic institution) bought the Rathbone estate and related structures, along with 53 acres (210,000 m^{2}) of land. In 1867, it tore down the mansion, but reused its materials in the construction of a new church on the property. School buildings were also constructed. President-elect Grover Cleveland visited the campus in 1884. The school changed its name to the Kenwood Academy.

In 1975, the Kenwood Academy merged with the Episcopal St Agnes School; the new institution—which continued to operate on the Kenwood campus for several decades—was named The Doane Stuart School. The Doane Stuart School moved away from the Kenwood campus to a new campus in Rensselaer, New York in 2009.

Following the departure of The Doane Stuart School, the former Kenwood Academy campus, consisting of 74 acres (300,000 m^{2}), was listed for sale in 2009. In 2010, the Preservation League of New York State declared the campus to be one of its "Seven to Save" endangered historic sites for that year. The property was sold on August 21, 2017 for the sum of $3 million. The purchaser of the property stated that he intended to turn the property into a condominium complex. The project was not completed, and the property was later foreclosed upon.

On March 23, 2023, the Kenwood Academy building burned. Speaking about the Kenwood Academy fire, Albany Mayor Kathy Sheehan said, "'We lost a treasure here and it’s challenging, it’s frustrating'". The building was later demolished.

== Famous residents ==
- Winifred Goldring (first female State Paleontologist of New York.)

== See also ==
- History of Albany, New York
