= South Bethlehem =

South Bethlehem may refer to:

- South Bethlehem Downtown Historic District in Bethlehem, Pennsylvania in the Lehigh Valley
- South Bethlehem, New York in Albany County, New York
- South Bethlehem, Pennsylvania in western Pennsylvania
