= Winifred Goldring =

American paleontologist

- Born: February 11, 1888; Kenwood, New York
- Died: January 30, 1971 (aged 82)
- Education: Wellesley College
- Known for: First woman appointed as a state paleontologist
- Scientific career
- Fields: Paleontology

Winifred Goldring (February 1, 1888 – January 30, 1971) was an American paleontologist whose work included a description of stromatolites, as well as the study of Devonian crinoids. She was the first woman in the nation to be appointed as a State Paleontologist.

== Early life and education ==
Goldring was born in Kenwood, New York, to Frederick Goldring, an orchid specialist at the Erastus Corning estate, and Mary Grey, a local school teacher whose father was the head of the orchid that Frederick was employed. Shortly after, in 1890, Goldring, her parents and her seven sisters and one brother moved to Slingerlands, New York, so her family could operate a greenhouse business. Goldring lived here, in her childhood home, for the majority of her life (81 years). Goldring spent her life devoted to her education and professional career, and as a result, she never married. She did, however, spend time learning the violin purely for her love of music.

Her journey into education began at Slingerland District school, and then after spending nine years there, she went on to The Milne School in Albany, NY in which she graduated as valedictorian in 1905. Between classes, she spent much of her free time exploring the outdoors, where she developed a love and curiosity for Lower Devonian rocks. Following this, she enrolled in Wellesley College, a school for women, with an intended major in classical languages before developing a love for science. She attained her Bachelors in 1909 and her Masters in 1912, while also obtaining graduate work at Harvard University. She finished her education at Johns Hopkins University, her school in 1921.

== Professional career ==
Goldring first began her career as a geology professor at her alma mater Wellesley College, and as well obtained a position at Boston's Teacher's School of Science. In 1912, Goldring went on to work for the New York State Museum as a scientific expert in Paleontology. At the New York State Museum, she was hired to work as a scientific expert where she specialized in invertebrate paleontological exhibits and dioramas. From here, she successfully collected and organized data from an unfinished collaborative study on Devonian Crinoids. In 1916, her boss at the New York State Museum requested her to continue work on a crinoid fossil study, which had been started but not completed by several other paleontologists before her. She was required to finish identifying the different taxonomies of crinoid fossils. Not only was she able to complete this study in seven years, but out of the 25 families, 60 genera, and 155 species she recorded, she identified 2 new families, 18 new genera and 58 new species. Based on this evidence Goldring concluded the stumps were a new genus she chose to name Eospermatoperis. Goldring published her findings in a monograph in 1923. This was so successful that other scientists and paleontologists sent her their own fossil samples for her to identify.

On top of the Devonian Crinoids, Goldring also contributed many other dioramas to the New York State Museum. The Petrified Sea Gardens, the stromatolite site that she studied, is a National Natural Landmark and a National Historic Landmark of the United States. Her most famous diorama recreated the living fossil seed fern forest from the Devonian period in what is now Gilboa, New York. This model truly solidified her reputation as an excellent paleontologist. This was possibly the first-ever diorama about early life anyone had created. This acclaimed diorama was named the Gilboa Fossil Forest after where it was located, as well as what Goldring used to piece together the layout of this diorama. In 1850 and 1920 in Gilboa, New York, petrified wood and fossilized rocks, respectively, were found and in 1920, Goldring studied them and eventually identified them to be the fossils of seed ferns.

Goldring was an educator as well as a researcher, so while she devoted most of her life to the museum, she extensively utilized her knowledge to make the contents go beyond simply filling the museum by exploring ways to teach paleontology to the visitors. For example, Goldring's success with geological models and teaching displays progressed into her publishing many books on geology, some of these publications were even used for post secondary education purposes. She created two geological models that were made to teach geological basics. They were titled “What is a Fossil” and “What is a Geological Formation”.

She rarely conducted research abroad or traveled out of the state of New York, however, the one trip she had made was of great importance. In order to help Dr. John M. Clarke write his memoir on the areas of Gaspé and Nova Scotia, Goldring traveled there to collect Devonian fossils. Over the first 10 years of her career, she quickly proved her skills, earning different promotions including first Assistant Paleontologist, the Associate Paleontologist, Paleobotanist, and Assistant State Paleontologist. Goldring eventually became the fourth State Paleontologist of New York, and the first woman to hold that position. In 1949 she was elected president of the Paleontological Society (the largest association of paleontologists in the world), the first woman to hold that office and one of only three women to attain that position to this day. Because these were (and still are) male-dominated geological societies, large numbers of men would not have supported her candidacy, underscoring her prominence as a nationally known geologist respected for the quality of her research, despite prevalent gender prejudices in academia. Winfred faced many equality issues such as unfair compensation and rare opportunities for advancement and in 1918 she briefly resigned over issues of inadequate salary combined with great pressures.

After forty years of commitment to the field, Goldring retired in 1954 and spent the next sixteen years at her family home in Slingerlands.

== Historical marker ==
On June 13, 2025, a historical marker honoring Goldring was unveiled at John Boyd Thacher State Park.
