= LeGrange Farmstead =

Historic house in New York, United States

- U.S. National Register of Historic Places
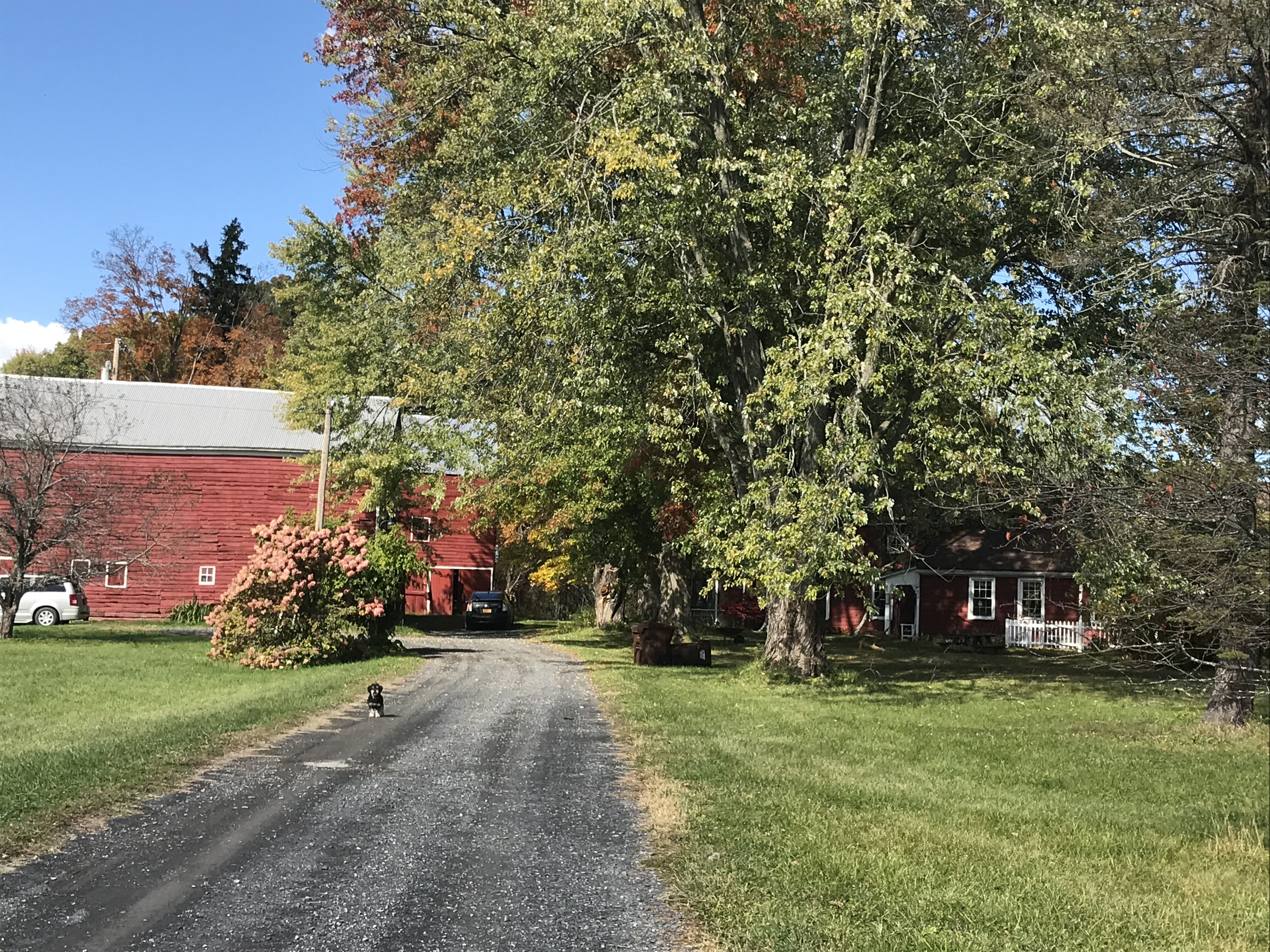
- House and barns at LaGrange Farmstead

- Location within New York Location within the United States
- Nearest city: Slingerlands, New York
- Coordinates: 42°39′13″N 73°52′56″W
- Area: 10 acres (4.0 ha)
- Built: 1780
- Architectural style: Greek Revival, Italianate, et al.
- NRHP reference No.: 05001384
- Added to NRHP: December 7, 2005

LaGrange Farmstead is a historic home located at Slingerlands in Albany County, New York. It is a frame dwelling that encompasses five phases of construction. The oldest section was built about 1780 and the second about 1790. Construction in 1835 yielded the 1 1/2-story kitchen and wood shed addition. A 1 1/2-story, shed-roofed addition on the north side was completed about 1860. The final addition was completed in about 1985. Also on the property are two heavy frame barns dated to about 1835 and 1879 and a frame corn crib.

The land on which the Farmstead stands was originally settled in the early 1700s by Omie de LaGrange and his brother Isaac, near the Normanskill. The last LaGrange owner of the land was Ella LaGrange McBride. It passed out of the family in 1956.

It was listed on the National Register of Historic Places in 2005.
