= South Bethlehem, New York =

- Hamlet
- Location within New York Location within the United States
- Coordinates: 42°31′55″N 73°50′50″W
- Country: United States
- State: New York
- Region: Capital District
- County: Albany
- Town: Bethlehem
- Elevation: 213 ft (65 m)
- Time zone: UTC-5 (EST)
  - Summer (DST): UTC-4 (EDT)
- ZIP Code: 12161
- Area code: 518

South Bethlehem is a hamlet in the town of Bethlehem, Albany County, New York, United States. The hamlet sits on New York State Route 396 (Bridge Street) and lies southwest of the Selkirk Rail Yard and just north of the Coeymans town line.

== History ==
The oldest part of the hamlet is along the main street, Bridge Street. The heart of the community is the four corners formed by the intersection of Bridge Street with South Street (Albany County Route 101) and Willowbrook Avenue. In the 18th century, this place was called Janes Corners for resident Elishama Janes, and Kimmey's Corners in 1864 for Philip Kimmey. The South Bethlehem Plank Road was incorporated in 1851 with a charter lasting 30 years to build and operate a plank road from Bethlehem Center to South Bethlehem. The road began in Bethlehem Center at an intersection with the Albany and Bethlehem Turnpike, and traveled south to Becker's Corners, this section is today US Route 9W; and then southwest from that hamlet to South Bethlehem, today New York State Route 396. The charter was renewed in 1881 and the use of planks was discontinued in favor of gravel and stone. The South Bethlehem post office was established in 1874.

Being located just south of the Selkirk Rail Yard most of the residents in the 1920s were employed there. Though the rail yard has lessened in importance and employment, most residents continue to work locally at the SABIC Innovative Plastics (formerly General Electric plastics division), the school district, or Owens Corning.

In 1990, due to the shift of the area from rural farmland and woods to a more residential community the town decided to build South Bethlehem's first park. The South Bethlehem Park is on 10 acres (40,000 m^{2}) off South Albany Road purchased by the town in 1989. The playground at the park was built with money and materials donated by around 40 area businesses, including $10,000 of equipment from General Electric. Approximately 30 residents along with 75 employees from General Electric's Selkirk plant donated their time for the construction of the playground. This community activity spawned the birth of the South Bethlehem Area Association. In 1992, after years of controversy and complaints about odor and garbage littering the landscape, a privately owned 3.35-acre (13,600 m^{2}) dump used by Waste Management of Greater Albany was closed.

Rowe Farm was listed on the National Register of Historic Places in 2012.

== Geography ==
South Bethlehem is at the very southernmost edge of the town of Bethlehem. The South Bethlehem Area Association covers from US 9W west to Albany County Route 102 and from Feura Bush south to the Coeymans town line.

== Demographics ==
In 1886, the population was placed at 135, and in 1906 at around 150 people. In 1987, the estimated population of South Bethlehem was 500 people.

== Education ==
South Bethlehem is a part of the Ravena-Coeymans-Selkirk Central School District (R-C-S) and the children attend A.W. Becker Elementary School for kindergarten through fifth grade; and R-C-S Middle and R-C-S High for sixth through twelfth.
