= Glenmont, New York =

- Hamlet
- Location within New York Location within the United States
- Coordinates: 42°36′17″N 73°46′10″W
- Country: United States
- State: New York
- Region: Capital District
- County: Albany
- Town: Bethlehem
- Named after: Cornelius Glen
- Time zone: UTC-5 (EST)
  - Summer (DST): UTC-4 (EDT)
- ZIP Code: 12077
- Area code: 518

Glenmont is a hamlet in the town of Bethlehem, Albany County, New York, United States. Glenmont is in the northeastern corner of the town and is a suburb of the neighboring city of Albany. It is bordered to the east by the Hudson River. Originally a farm town, today Glenmont is home to residential neighborhoods, a busy commercial corridor along Route 9W, and industry along the riverfront. It is part of the Bethlehem Central School District, Glenmont contains Glenmont Elementary School, an elementary school for grades K-5, the current principal is Laura Heffernan.

== History ==
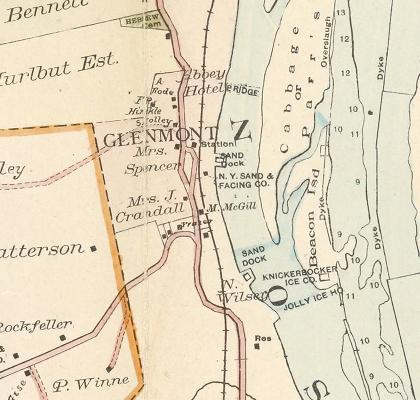
Map of Glenmont in 1891

Glenmont dates back to the founding of the first hotel in Bethlehem, The Abbey Hotel, built in the early 18th century. East of the hotel along the Hudson's shores was a racing track. The hotel was situated halfway between Albany and Van Wie('s) Point. Both Van Wie and The Abbey were important stops along the Hudson River for passengers traveling by boat (and later steamboat) from New York City to Albany. In 1804, the Albany and Bethlehem Turnpike's lower leg traveled from Kenwood south to The Abbey. The hotel was demolished in the 1960s.
