= Slingerlands, New York =

- Hamlet
- Location within New York Location within the United States
- Coordinates: 42°37′45″N 73°51′52″W
- Country: United States
- State: New York
- Region: Capital District
- County: Albany
- Town: Bethlehem
- Settled: 1850
- Named for: William Slingerland and descendants
- Elevation: 220 ft (67 m)
- Time zone: UTC-5 (EST)
  - Summer (DST): UTC-4 (EDT)
- ZIP Code: 12159
- Area code: 518

Slingerlands is a hamlet in the town of Bethlehem, Albany County, New York, United States. It is located immediately west of Delmar and near the New Scotland town-line and south of the Albany city-limits and is thus a suburb of Albany. The Slingerlands ZIP Code (12159) includes parts of the towns of New Scotland and Guilderland.

== History ==
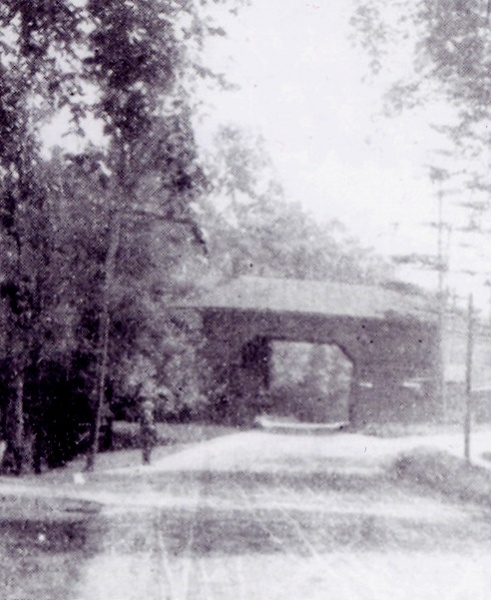
View of the tollgate in Slingerlands, this was demolished in 1908.

The history of Slingerlands begins in 1850 when the Albany, Rensselaerville, and Schoharie Plank Road Company was established by the state to construct a plank road from Albany, through Slingerlands, to Gallupville in Schoharie County. In 1854, the state authorized the company to abandon or sell portions and to turn other sections (including that part in Slingerlands) into a turnpike and charge tolls. The post office was originally called Normanskill and was built in 1852 with William H. Slingerland as the first post master. In 1863, the Albany and Susquehanna Railroad was built through Slingerlands with a station established here as well. William H. Slingerland was the surveyor of the road, and since his route came in $600,000 less than a previous survey the company named the station here Slingerlands in his honor. In 1870, the post office also took the name Slingerlands. After having been in the rear of a grocery store for a hundred years it moved to the Tollgate Building in 1953, until the 1990s when a newer larger location was built near the Price Chopper Plaza. In 1989, the New Scotland post office was closed and the 400 residents it served were transferred to Slingerlands' ZIP Code.

Aerial view of Slingerlands Bypass (to the left) and New Scotland Road (to the right).

New Scotland Road through Slingerlands was labeled as part of New York State Route 85 in the 1930 renumbering of state highways. In 1968, the Slingerlands Bypass was constructed as a two-lane extension of the Crosstown Connection, a limited-access highway in the city of Albany; Route 85 was then routed onto this highway. The original plan was to connect with the Delmar Bypass near New York State Route 85A, thereby bypassing Slingerlands, it and the Delmar Bypass were never finished due to a lack of funding. In 1987, the developer of the Juniper Fields sub-division agreed to build for the town a 1,700 foot extension of the Delmar Bypass to Van Dyke Avenue, and the developer of Delmar Village agreed to build a 2,750 foot extension of Fisher Boulevard to Delaware Avenue, this then left only a 6,000 foot extension of the Delmar Bypass to complete a full loop around Delmar and Slingerlands. At the time it was still the long-term goal of the town to extend both bypasses themselves to their original meeting point near Route 85A. In 2007, the existing Slingerlands Bypass was reconstructed from two to four lanes and the highway was extended behind the Price Chopper Plaza to meet New Scotland Road over Le Grange Road opposite Cherry Avenue Extension. Each intersection, four in all, were converted to two-lane roundabouts.

The Slingerlands Homeowners Association was founded in 1972 and is the oldest neighborhood association in the town of Bethlehem. The neighborhood group had become moribund by the late 1980s, but was reactivated by controversy over a new shopping center and succeeded in having the shopping center, today the Price Chopper Plaza, scaled back by almost half.

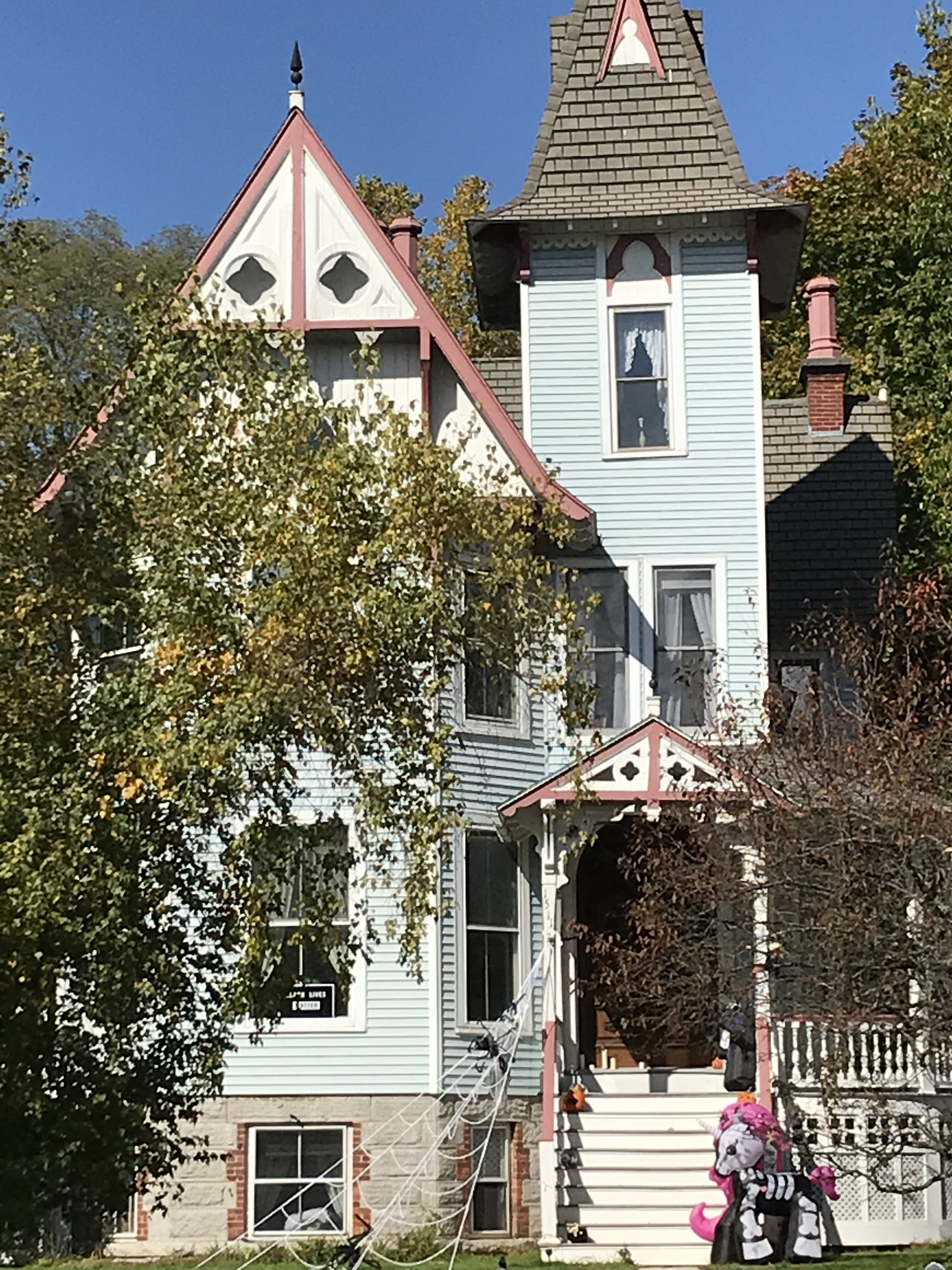
Victorian house, known as the Dillenbeck House, in Slingerlands NY, used in the film Ironweed.

In 1987, Slingerlands was the site of filming for some scenes in the movie Ironweed, which starred Jack Nicholson, based on the book of the same name written by William Kennedy. Scenes were filmed of a recreated 1930s era steam locomotive and the Dillenbeck House at 1511 New Scotland Road (built in 1876).

The Slingerlands Historic District was listed on the National Register of Historic Places in 2012. Also listed are the House at 698 Kenwood Avenue, LeGrange Farmstead, and Albert Slingerlands House.

== Geography ==
Slingerlands is situated along New Scotland Road (New York State Route 85) from the Albany city-limits south and west to Fisher Boulevard near the New Scotland town-line; and along Kenwood Avenue east from NY 85 to Adrianca Lane.

== Demographics ==
As of July 2026, the population of Slingerlands ZIP code, which is larger geographically than the hamlet itself, is 8,524.

== Architecture ==
Slingerlands is predominately residential, with commercial properties mostly along New Scotland Road from the Albany city-line south to the intersection with Kenwood Avenue. Many historic homes and buildings from the 1800s still stand in the heart of the hamlet, many of which are associated with the founding family of the Slingerland's, such as the Dillenback House built by Albert Slingerland. The oldest house in the hamlet is that of John Albert Slingerland, and Albert I. Slingerland built the Slingerlands Community Methodist Church in 1872. The Old Slingerlands Schoolhouse built in 1908 has been converted into apartments.

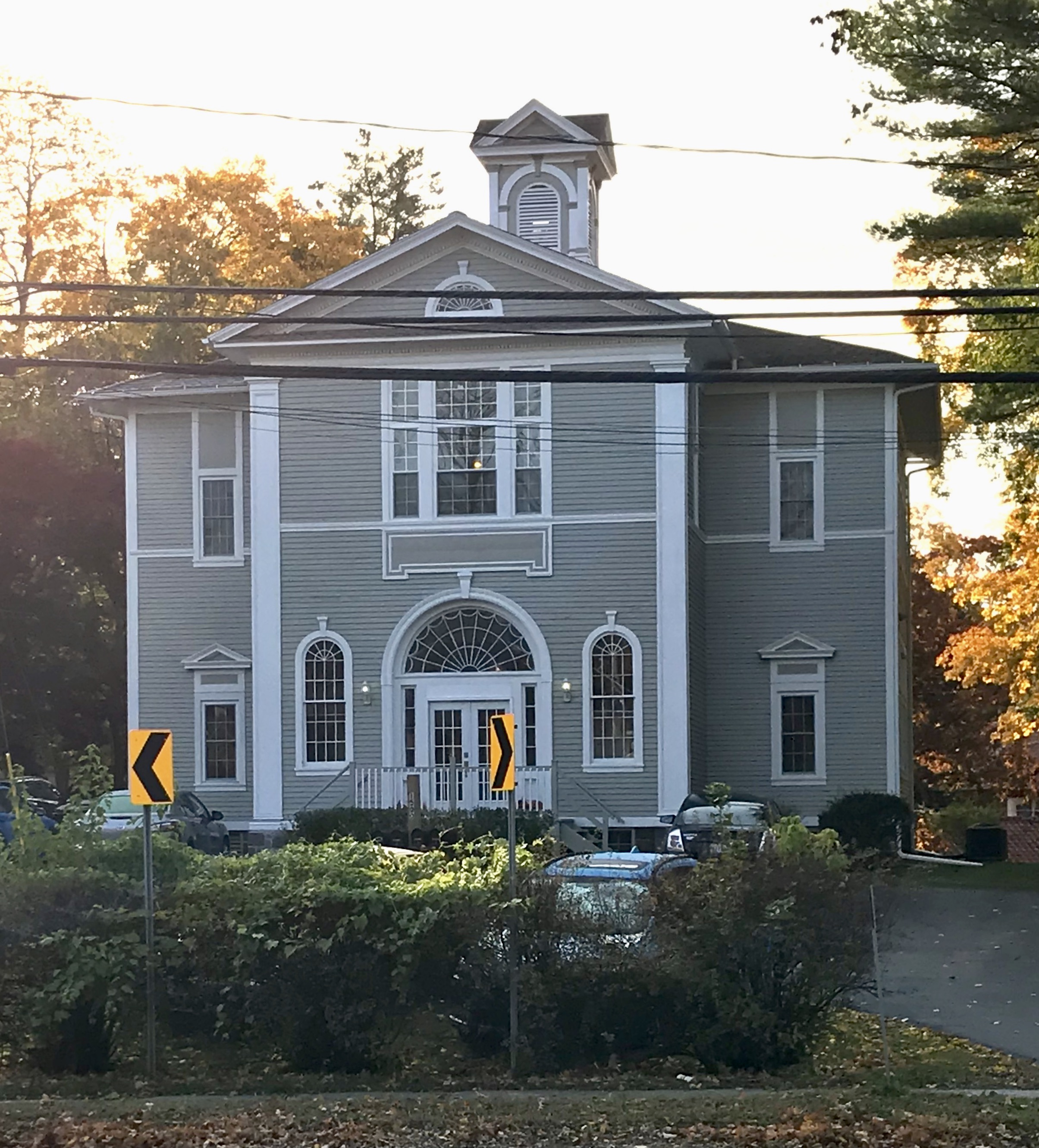
Former Slingerlands NY Schoolhouse

Much of the newer residential construction has been built in a style to imitate that of the historic house-styles, such as Greek Revival, Federal, Victorian, and Colonial. A house in Slingerlands built in 1922 was once the official residence for the president of the University at Albany, SUNY. Among the relatively new, yet still historic, is a 1929 cottage built from a kit bought from the Sears, Roebuck catalogue.

== Parks and recreation ==
The Albany County Helderberg-Hudson Rail Trail, which stretches for nine miles from the Port of Albany to Voorheesville, runs through Slingerlands. It was built on a Canadian Pacific rail line that was being abandoned. The land was purchased by Albany County for the trail in 2010. The first portion was completed in 2011, then extended in 2012. The fully paved trail is used for walking, running, and bicycling. In the winter, it is left unplowed for snow shoeing and cross-country skiing.

The 22-acre Pine Hollow Arboretum is located in Slingerlands. The founder of the property, Dr. John W. Abbuhl, was a pediatrician who began planting trees around his home in 1966. The Arboretum's mission is "to preserve, manage and enhance native and introduced species in the natural and aesthetic environment."

== Education ==
Slingerlands is a part of the Bethlehem Central School District (BCSD). Slingerlands Elementary School is the neighborhood elementary school for kindergarten through fifth grade; and Bethlehem Central Middle School and Bethlehem Central High School are the district schools for sixth through twelfth.
