= District School No. 1 (Bethlehem, New York) =

- U.S. National Register of Historic Places
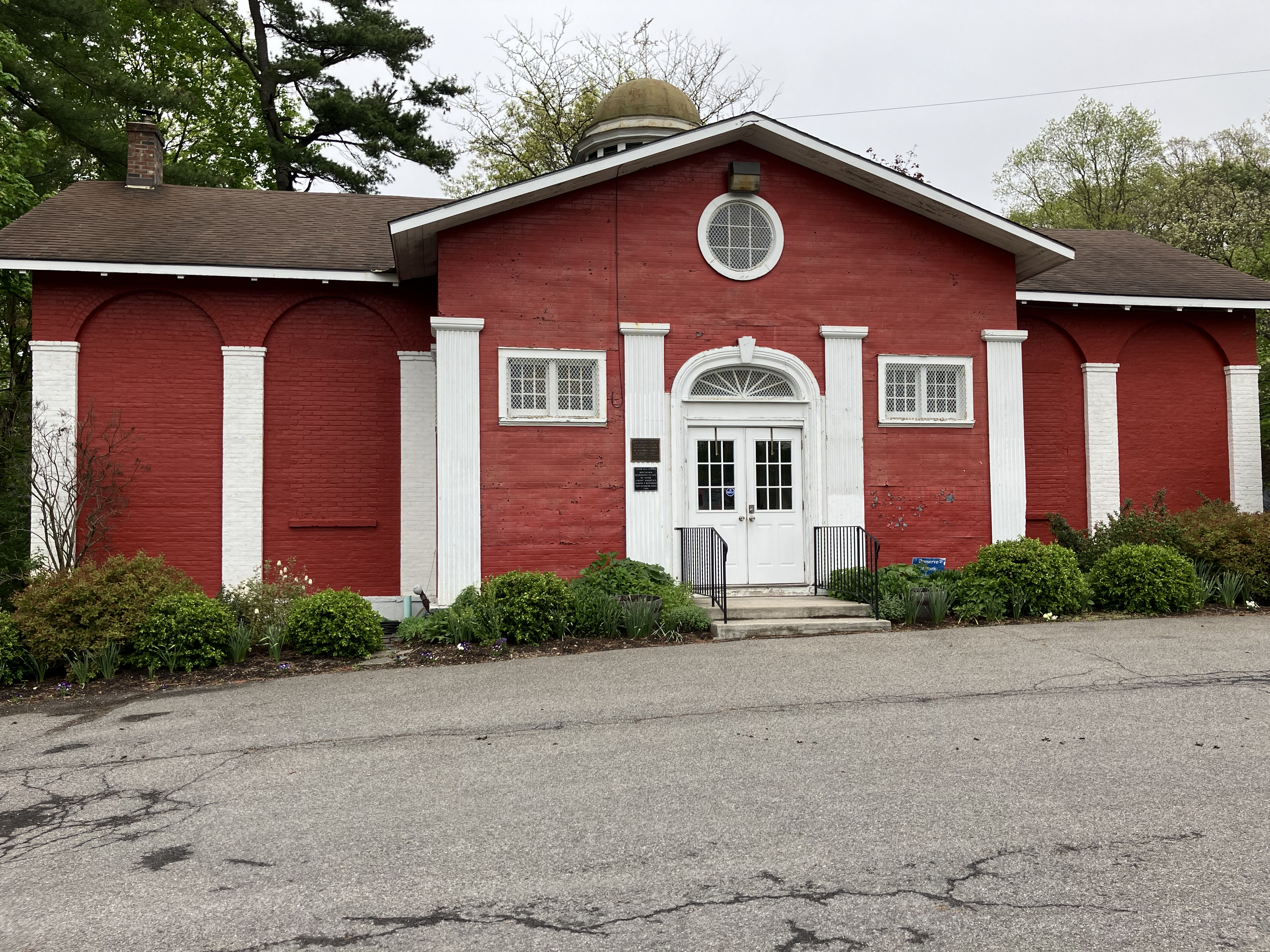
- District School Number 1 in 2024

- Location within New York Location within the United States
- Location: NY 144; Bethlehem, New York
- Coordinates: 42°33′11″N 73°46′12″W
- Area: less than one acre
- Built: 1859
- Architect: Reynolds, Marcus T.
- Architectural style: Italianate
- NRHP reference No.: 98000553
- Added to NRHP: May 20, 1998

District School No. 1, also known as Cedar Hill Schoolhouse, is a historic school building located in the Town of Bethlehem in Albany County, New York south of the capital. It was built in 1859 and expanded in 1907. It is a one-story, rectangular brick building, seven bays by three bays in the Italianate style with later Neoclassical details. It features an elaborate domed cupola. School use ceased in 1962. Since 1965 it has housed the Bethlehem Historical Society and museum.

It was listed on the National Register of Historic Places in 1998.
