= Rowe Farm =

- U.S. National Register of Historic Places
- Location within New York Location within the United States
- Location: 281 Bridge St., near South Bethlehem, New York
- Coordinates: 42°32′17″N 73°49′34″W
- Area: 24.8 acres (10.0 ha)
- Built: c. 1790, c. 1800, c. 1875, c. 1879, c. 1910
- Architectural style: Italianate
- NRHP reference No.: 11001088
- Added to NRHP: February 3, 2012

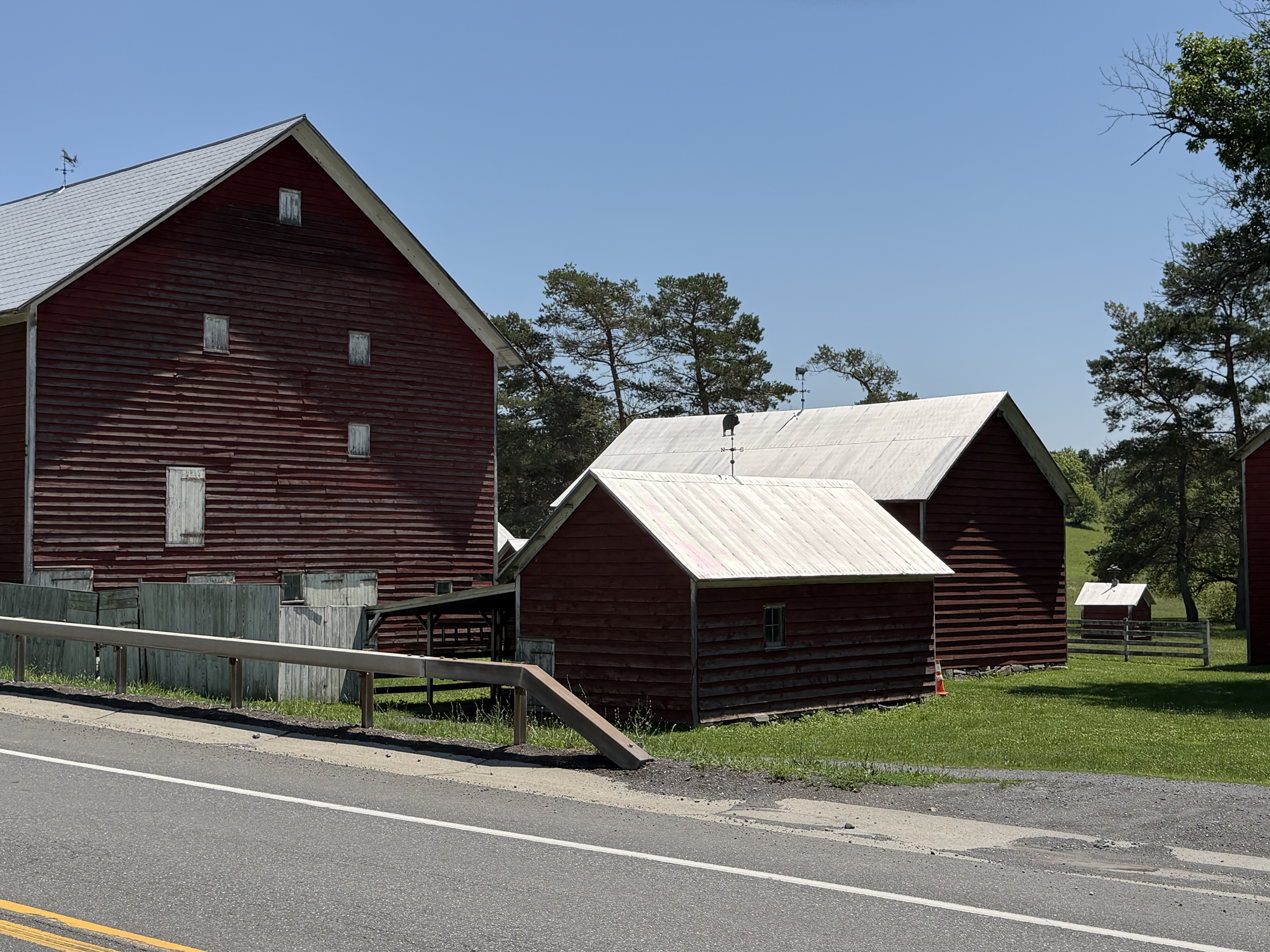
Rowe Farm Farm Buildings

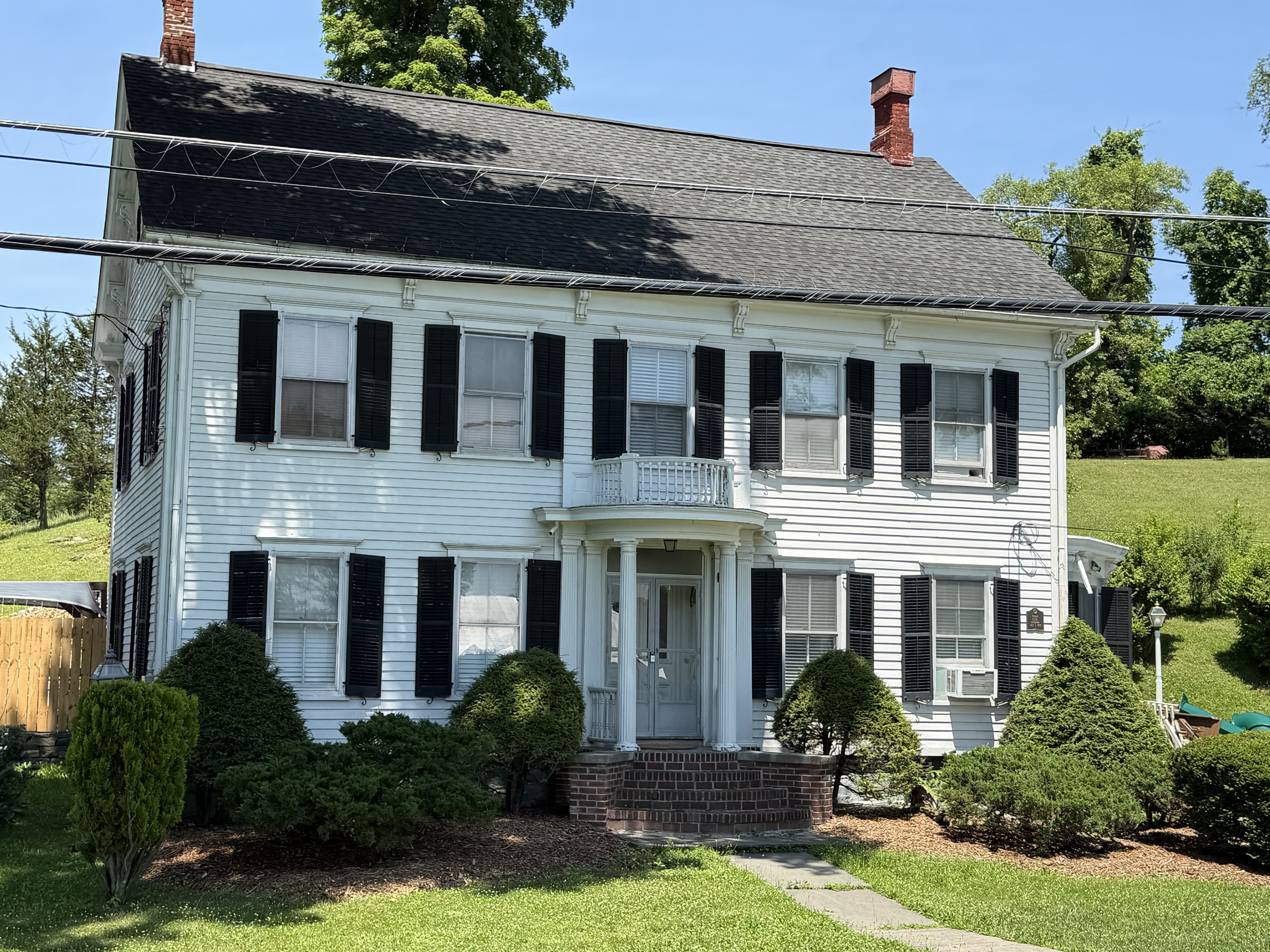
Rowe Farm House

Rowe Farm is a historic home and farm near South Bethlehem, Albany County, New York. The farmhouse was built about 1875, and is a two-story, Italianate frame dwelling with a center hall plan and a gable roof. Also on the property are the contributing Main Barn / Hay Barn (c. 1879), out kitchen (c. 1800), smokehouse (c. 1875), livestock barn (c. 1790), icehouse, shed and outhouse, pig barn, carriage barn (c. 1875), shed, fowl house, and blacksmith shop.

It was listed on the National Register of Historic Places in 2012.
