= First Reformed Dutch Church of Bethlehem =

- U.S. National Register of Historic Places
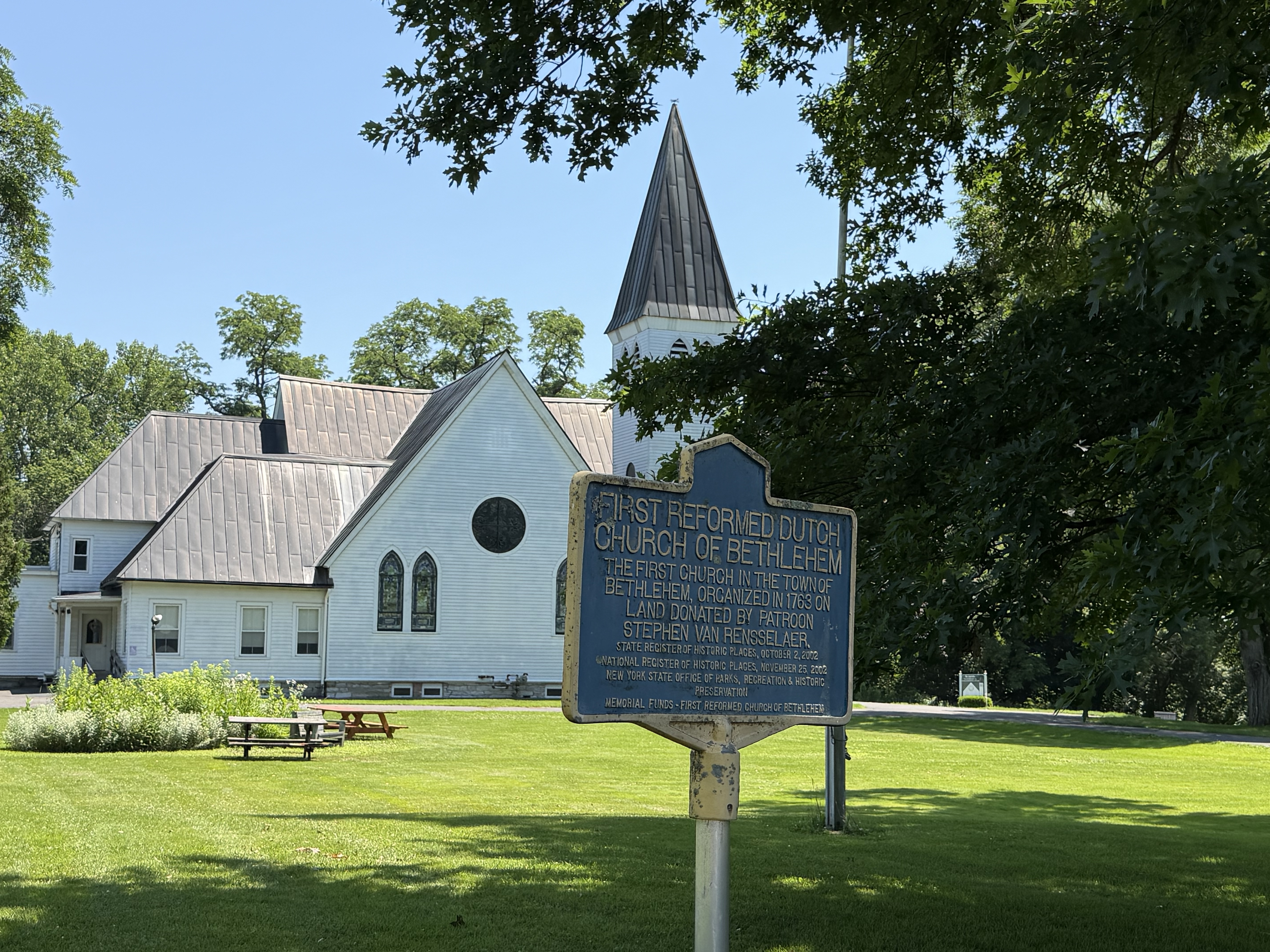
- First Dutch Reformed Church in 2026

- Location within New York
- Location: US 9W, Bethlehem, New York
- Coordinates: 42°33′43″N 73°48′18″W
- Area: 105.6 acres (42.7 ha)
- Built: 1795, ca. 1890
- Architect: Hoffman, Ernest
- Architectural style: Queen Anne, Federal
- NRHP reference No.: 02001398
- Added to NRHP: November 25, 2002

The First Reformed Dutch Church of Bethlehem, also known as the First Reformed Church, is a historic Reformed church located at Bethlehem, New York. The church dates to about 1890, and is a 2 1/2-half story square frame building on a stone foundation. It features an engaged front corner bell tower, with a 1,500 pound bell hung in the belfry. It has a 1 1/2 story perpendicular rear wing and side wings. The building is of frame construction and rests on a stone foundation. It is located on property granted to the church in 1795.

It was listed on the National Register of Historic Places in 2002.
