= Albert Slingerland House =

Historic house in New York, United States

- U.S. National Register of Historic Places
- Location within New York Location within the United States
- Location: 36 Bridge St., Slingerlands, New York
- Coordinates: 42°37′43″N 73°51′29″W
- Area: 2.2 acres (0.89 ha)
- Built: 1840
- Architectural style: Greek Revival
- NRHP reference No.: 97000068
- Added to NRHP: February 14, 1997

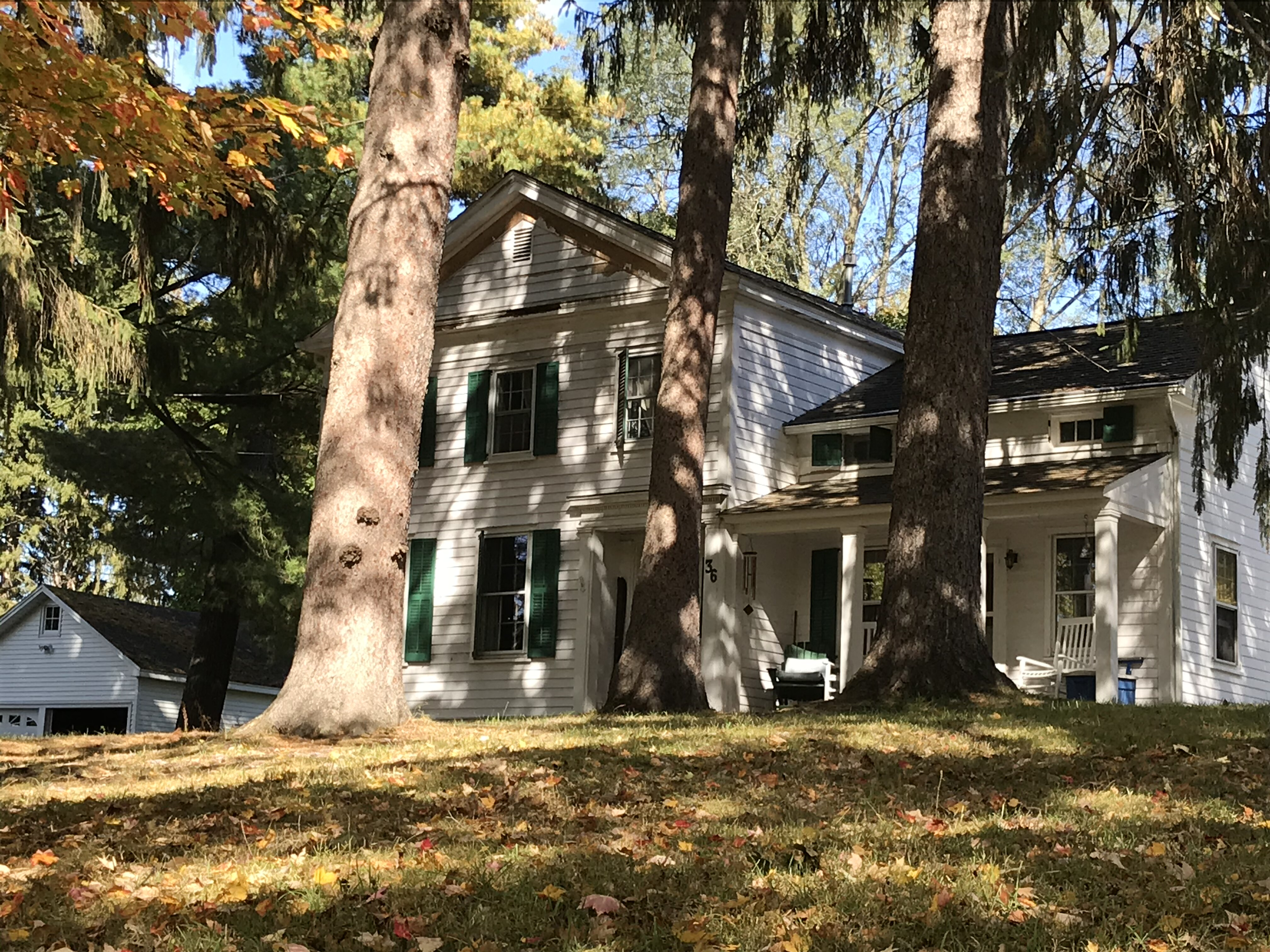
Albert Slingerland House, Slingerlands, NY. Built in 1840

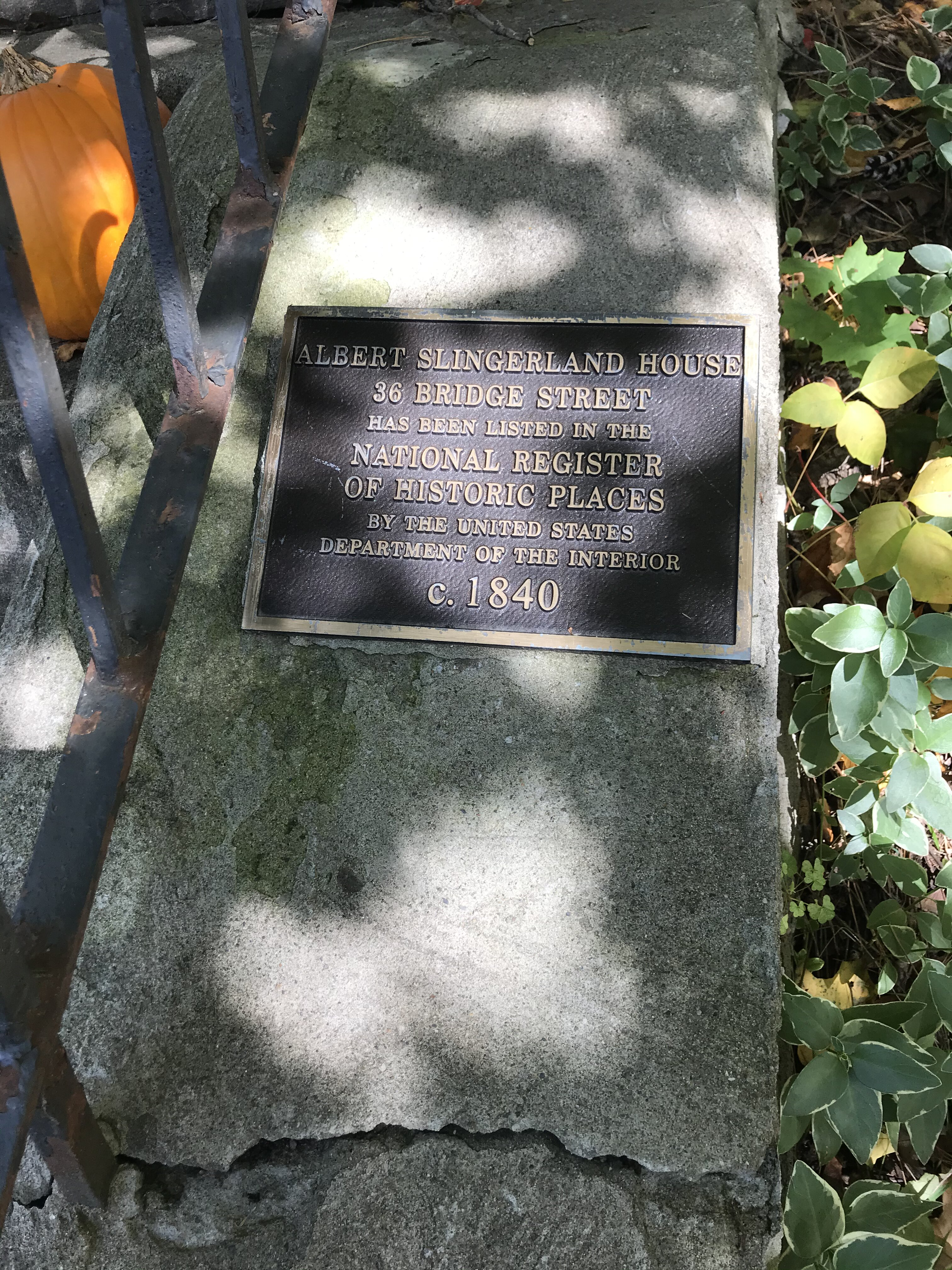
National Register of Historic Places marker at the Albert Slingerland House, 36 Bridge Street, Slingerlands, NY

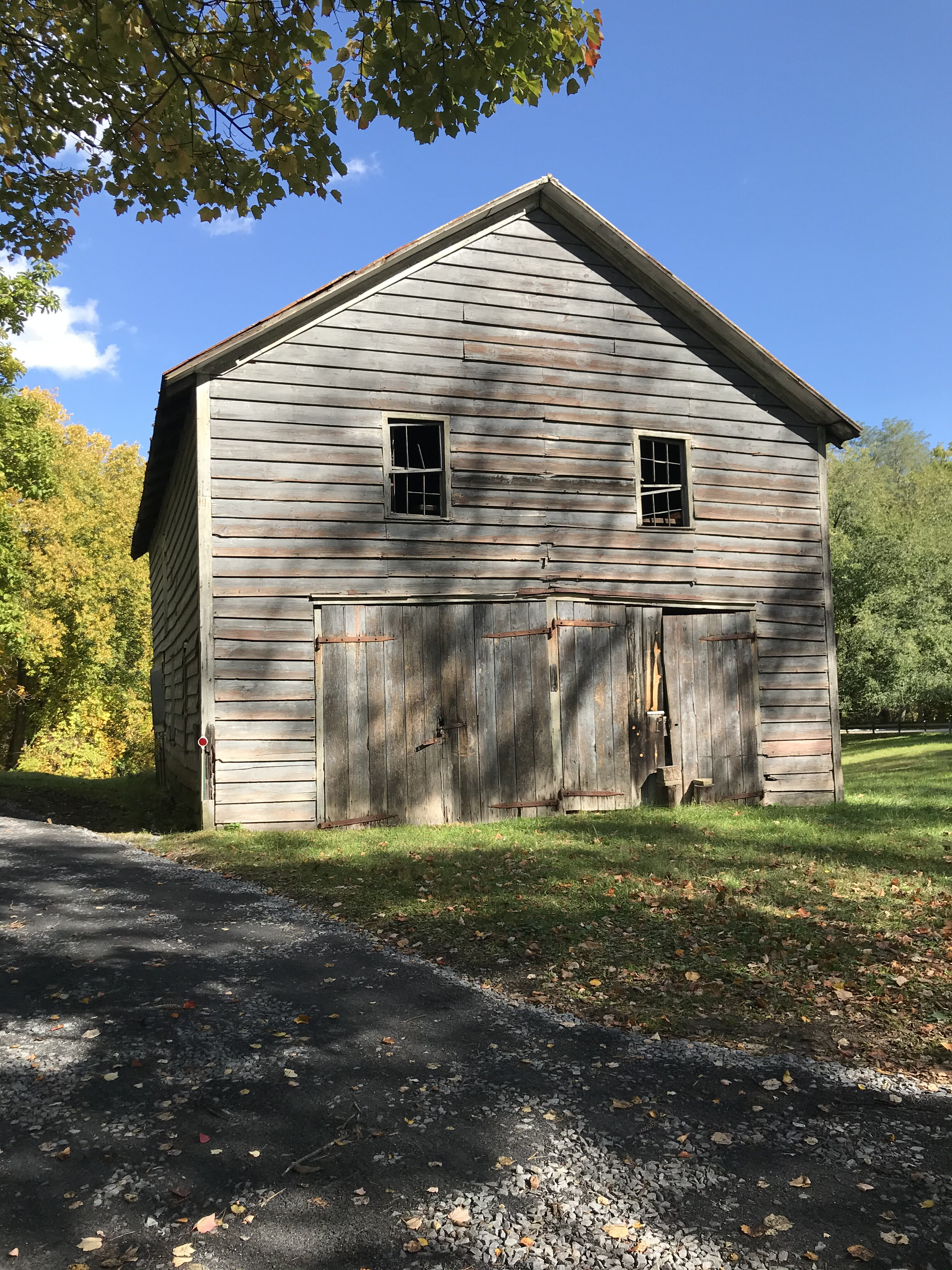
A barn on the Albert Slingerland house property

The Albert Slingerland House is a historic home located in Slingerlands in Albany County, New York. It was built about 1840 and is a 2-story, frame Greek Revival–style dwelling. It consists of a 2-story, gable-front main block with a 1 1/2-story side ell with a projecting porch. Also on the property are two 2-story frame barns dated to about 1840 and a brick smoke house.

It was listed on the National Register of Historic Places in 1997.
