= Bethlehem Center, New York =

- Hamlet
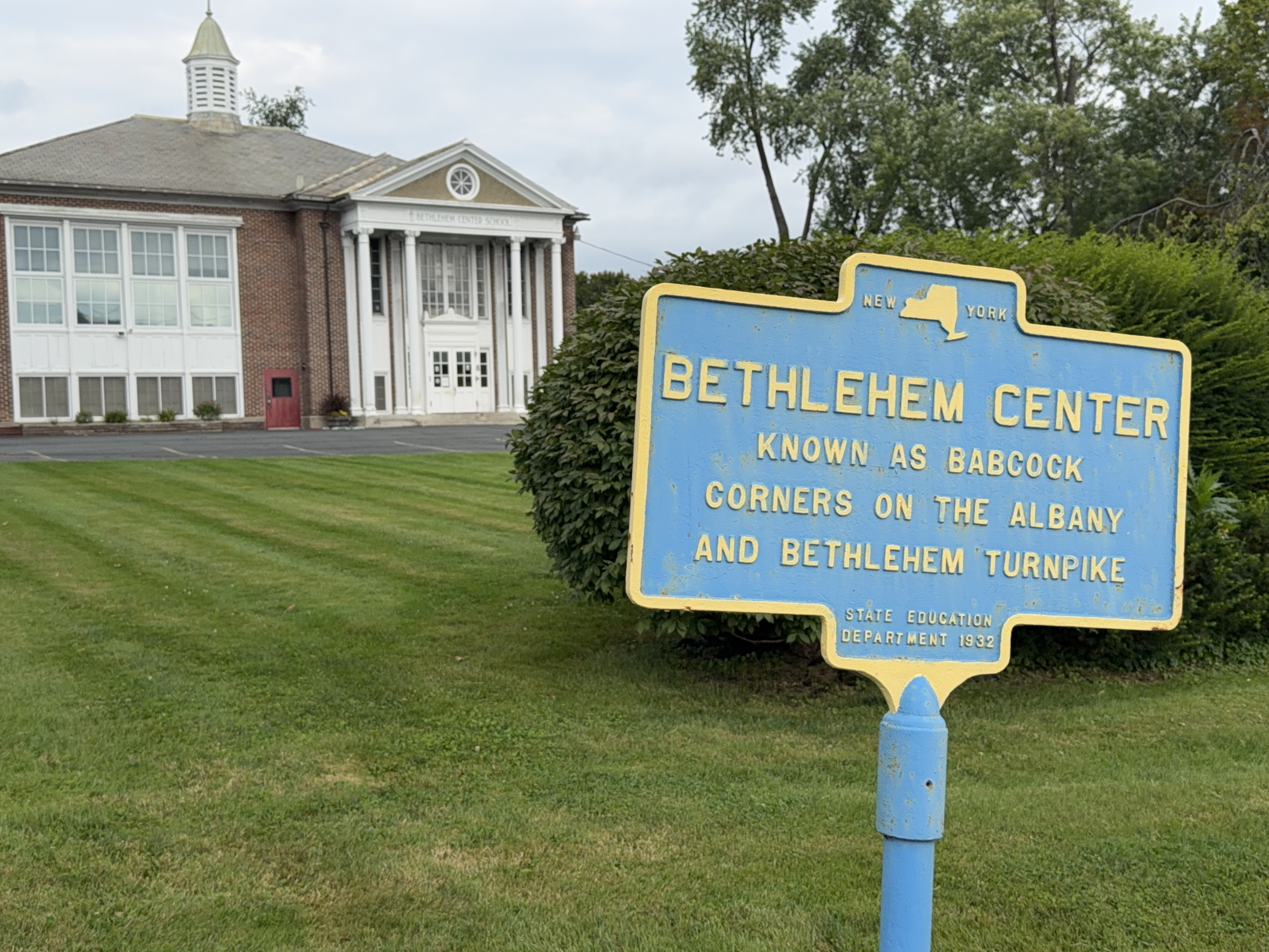
- Bethlehem Center Historic Marker

- Location within New York Location within the United States
- Coordinates: 42°36′07″N 73°47′29″W
- Country: United States
- State: New York
- County: Albany
- Town: Bethlehem
- Elevation: 190 ft (58 m)
- Time zone: UTC-5 (Eastern (EST))
  - Summer (DST): UTC-4 (EDT)
- ZIP code: 12077 (Glenmont)
- Area code: 518

Bethlehem Center, also known as Babcock's Corners or Bethlehem Centre, is a hamlet in the Town of Bethlehem in Albany County, New York. It is located at the junction of U.S. Route 9W (US 9W) and New York State Route 910A (NY 910A) also known as Feura Bush Road / Glenmont Road.

It is generally referred to as Glenmont, rather than Bethlehem Center.
