= Normansville, New York =

- Former hamlet
- Location within New York Location within the United States
- Coordinates: 42°38′01″N 73°47′57″W
- Country: United States
- State: New York
- Region: Capital District
- County: Albany
- Named for: the Normans Kill, a creek which ran through the community
- Time zone: UTC-5 (EST)
  - Summer (DST): UTC-4 (EDT)
- ZIP Codes: 12054 (Bethlehem); 12209 (Albany)
- Area code: 518

Normansville is a former hamlet in Albany County, New York, United States.

In the 19th century, Normansville was a hamlet in the town of Bethlehem. It is no longer a hamlet in the town of Bethlehem. Normansville is located within and along the north and south banks of the ravine carved by the Normans Kill, a tributary of the Hudson River. The area on the Albany side and on the Bethlehem side of the Normans Kill at the Delaware Avenue crossing is still known as Normansville.

== History ==
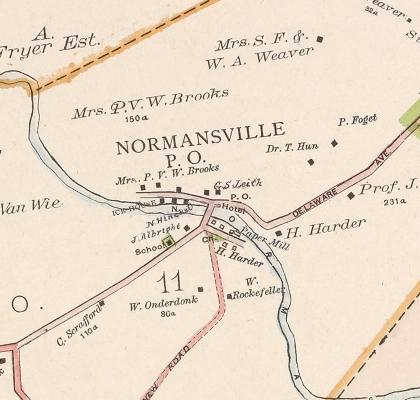
Map of Normansville in 1891

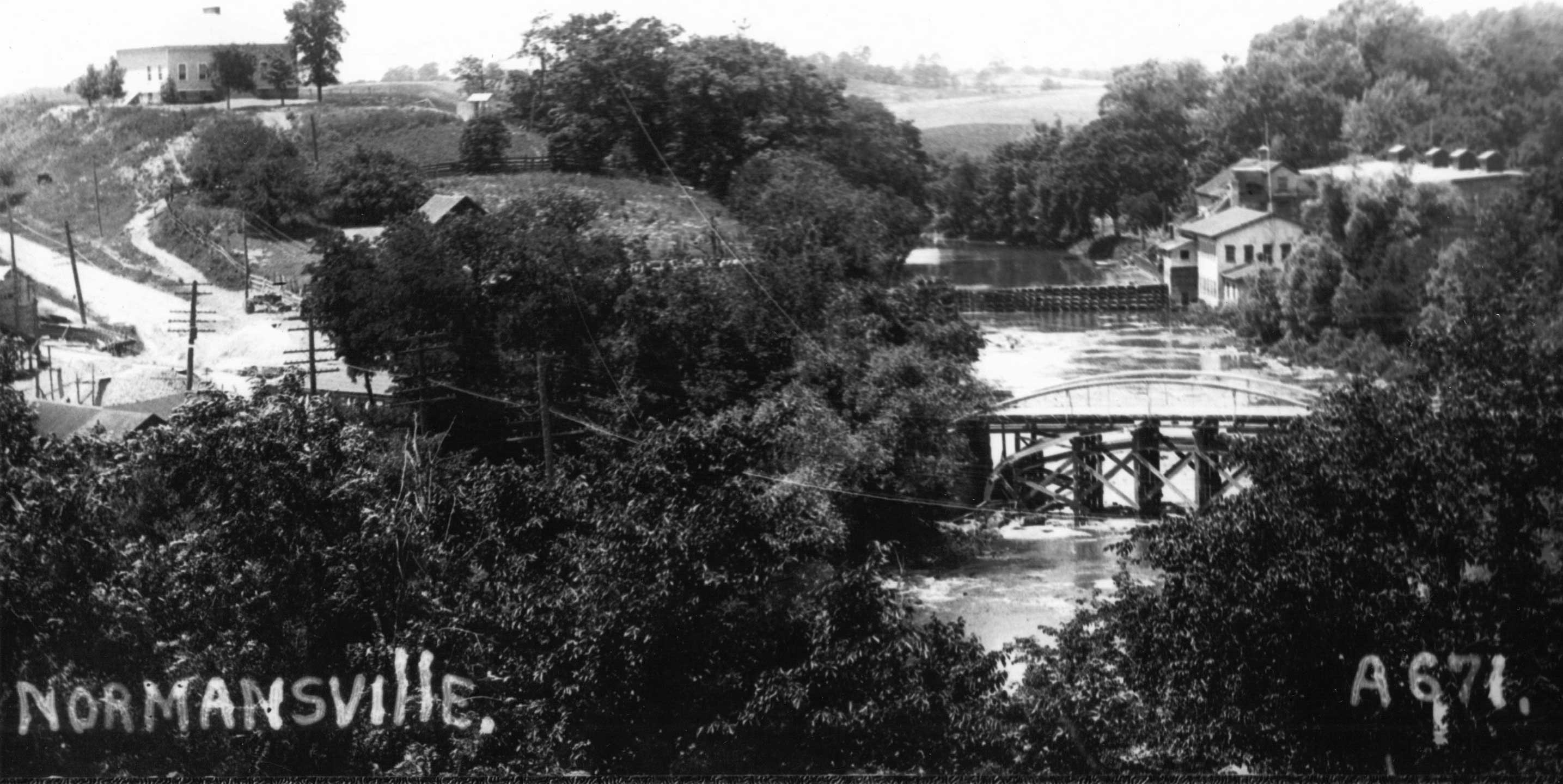
Photo of Normansville, circa 1900, school house (Bethlehem side) top left, ice house (Albany side) top right.

Normansville was originally called Upper Hollow; it was named for the deep ravine carved by the Normans Kill creek in which it was located. Further downstream was Lower Hollow, later named Kenwood. Upper Hollow had its start in 1805 with the construction of the Delaware Turnpike, which ran from Albany to Otego (which then was part of Delaware County). The turnpike was carried over the Normans Kill (kill is the middle Dutch word for "stream") by a 100-foot-long (30 m) wooden bridge. Northwest of this bridge was a toll gate. The wood bridge was washed away by a freshet in 1869 (one year after the turnpike company had abandoned the turnpike) and the town of Bethlehem built an iron bridge in its place.

Soon after the turnpike was constructed, taverns and various industries began to spring up to take advantage of the power that could be harnessed from the Normans Kill's waters. Among the industries were cloth mills and saw mills. Several of these mills were swept aside by the same freshet that washed away the bridge in 1869, but were quickly rebuilt. By the beginning of the 20th century, the mills were abandoned. Another major industry along the Normans Kill was the ice trade. Ice blocks from the Normans Kill during the winter and stored for shipping to New York City and other locations for use in iceboxes. The Pappalau Ice House on the north side of the creek was one of many ice houses along the Normans Kill and the Hudson River at the end of the 1800s; by 1920, it too would be abandoned as new technologies made the ice trade obsolete.

In 1910, much of the boundary between the city of Albany and the town of Bethlehem was moved south to the Normans Kill. This change split Normansville between the city of Albany and the town of Bethlehem. Prior to this annexation, the children of Normansville attended a small school (Bethlehem District Number 11) in Normansville on the Delaware Turnpike. After the annexation, those Normansville children whose homes were now located in Albany attended the Albany city schools, and the Normansville children remaining in the town of Bethlehem continued to attend school in District 11. Due to the annexation and the loss of a large amount of the taxable land, District 11 was consolidated into neighboring District Number 7 in 1919.

In 1929, Delaware Avenue was rerouted and a longer, higher highway bridge called the Normanskill Viaduct was built across the top of the Normans Kill ravine. The Normanskill Viaduct allowed commuters to pass between Bethlehem and Albany along Delaware Avenue without driving into the ravine where Normansville was located.

In the 1980s and 1990s, several changes occurred in the area known as Normansville. In 1986, the original yellow brick turnpike was paved over. In 1987, the Town of Bethlehem closed the Rockefeller Road Bridge due to safety concerns. Rockefeller Road was connected to Kenwood Avenue by way of a 1914 bridge over the (now-abandoned) Delaware and Hudson Railroad tracks. The closure of the bridge was supported by the Normansville Neighborhood Association due to a desire to prevent drivers from using Rockefeller Road as a shortcut between Kenwood and Delaware Avenues. In January 1990, the Old Normans Kill Bridge was closed to vehicular traffic. In the 1990s, the Normanskill Viaduct was dismantled and replaced by a new bridge 50 feet upstream.

As of 2015, the area on the Albany side and on the Bethlehem side of the Normans Kill at the Delaware Avenue crossing was still known as Normansville. The Normans Kill remained a boundary between Albany and Bethlehem.

As of July 2026, Normansville is not recognized as a hamlet within the Town of Bethlehem.

== Demographics ==
In 1886, the hamlet of Normansville (which then included both sides of the Normans Kill) included approximately 100 individuals, 22 families, and 17 dwellings. In 1993, it was estimated that the Bethlehem neighborhood of Normansville consisted of 50 people, 19 homes, and one church.

== Geography ==
Normansville is located within and along the banks of a ravine. This ravine was carved by the Normans Kill, a creek and tributary of the Hudson River that forms the border between the city of Albany to the north and the town of Bethlehem to the south. The ravine is of clay banks with the creek flowing over a bed of slate.

== Landmarks ==
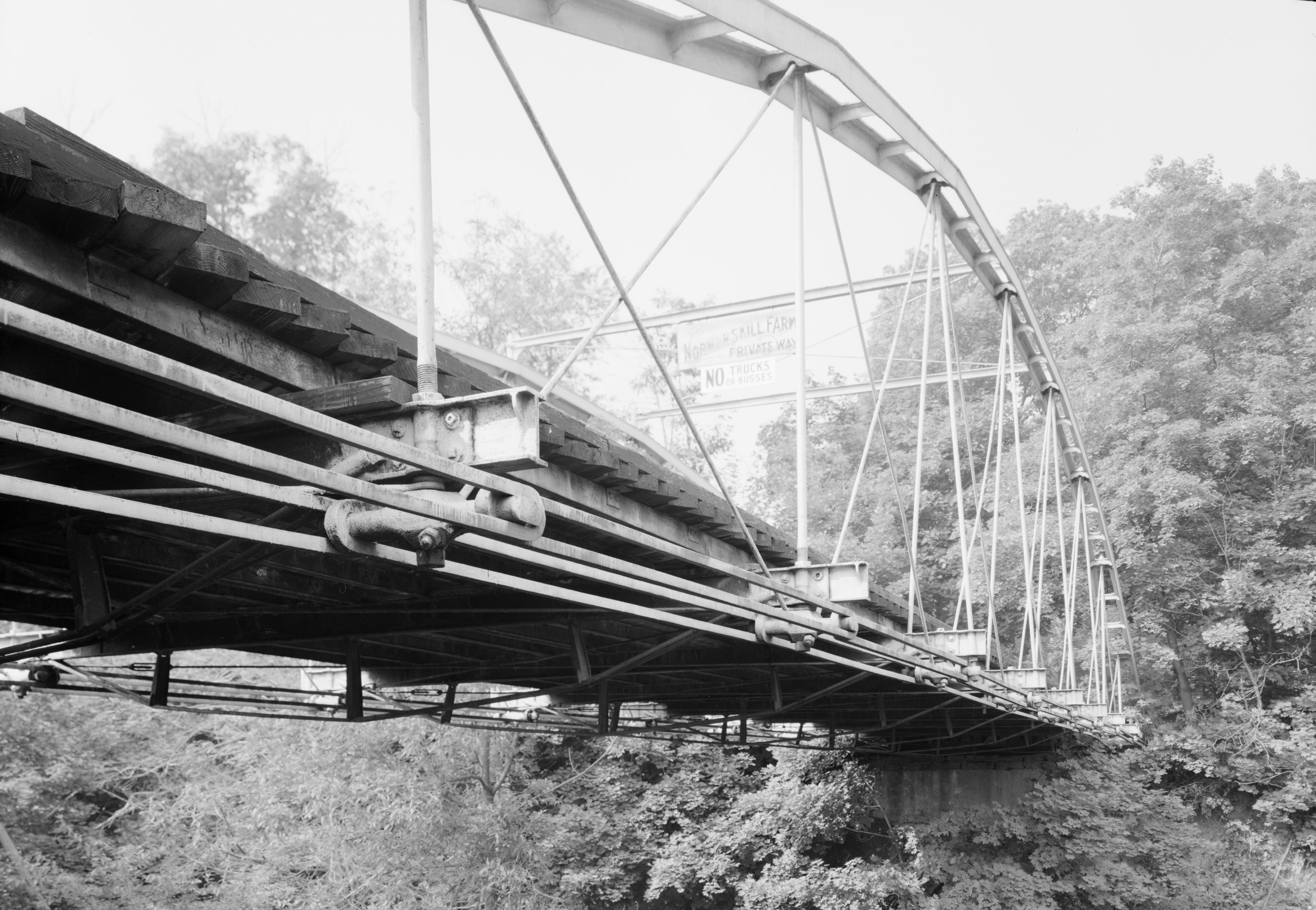
Whipple truss bridge at the Steven's Farm. It is on the National Register of Historic Places

- Steven's Farm, also known as Normanskill Farm, is a park and active farm owned by the City of Albany and located on the Albany side of the Normans Kill. The park has the largest of Albany's community gardens, a dog park, hiking trails, a working farm, historic farm buildings, and a historic whipple truss bridge from 1867. The Albany Mounted Police Unit's draft horses are also kept here. The domesticated ducks and geese that call Washington Park home are brought to Stevens Farm every year for winter accommodations.
- The Old Normans Kill Bridge is the original bridge across the Normans Kill. Built in 1884, the bridge is 158 feet long, is paved with yellow bricks, and is barely wide enough for two cars to pass. Local legend holds that Edgar Allan Poe wrote about the yellow bricks the road and bridge were paved with and this was picked up by L. Frank Baum who used this reference in The Wonderful Wizard of Oz. Local historians stress that this legend is unconfirmed. In January 1990, the Old Normans Kill Bridge was closed to vehicular traffic. The bridge remained available for pedestrian use.

== See also ==
- History of Albany, New York
