= Ed O'Keefe =

American journalist

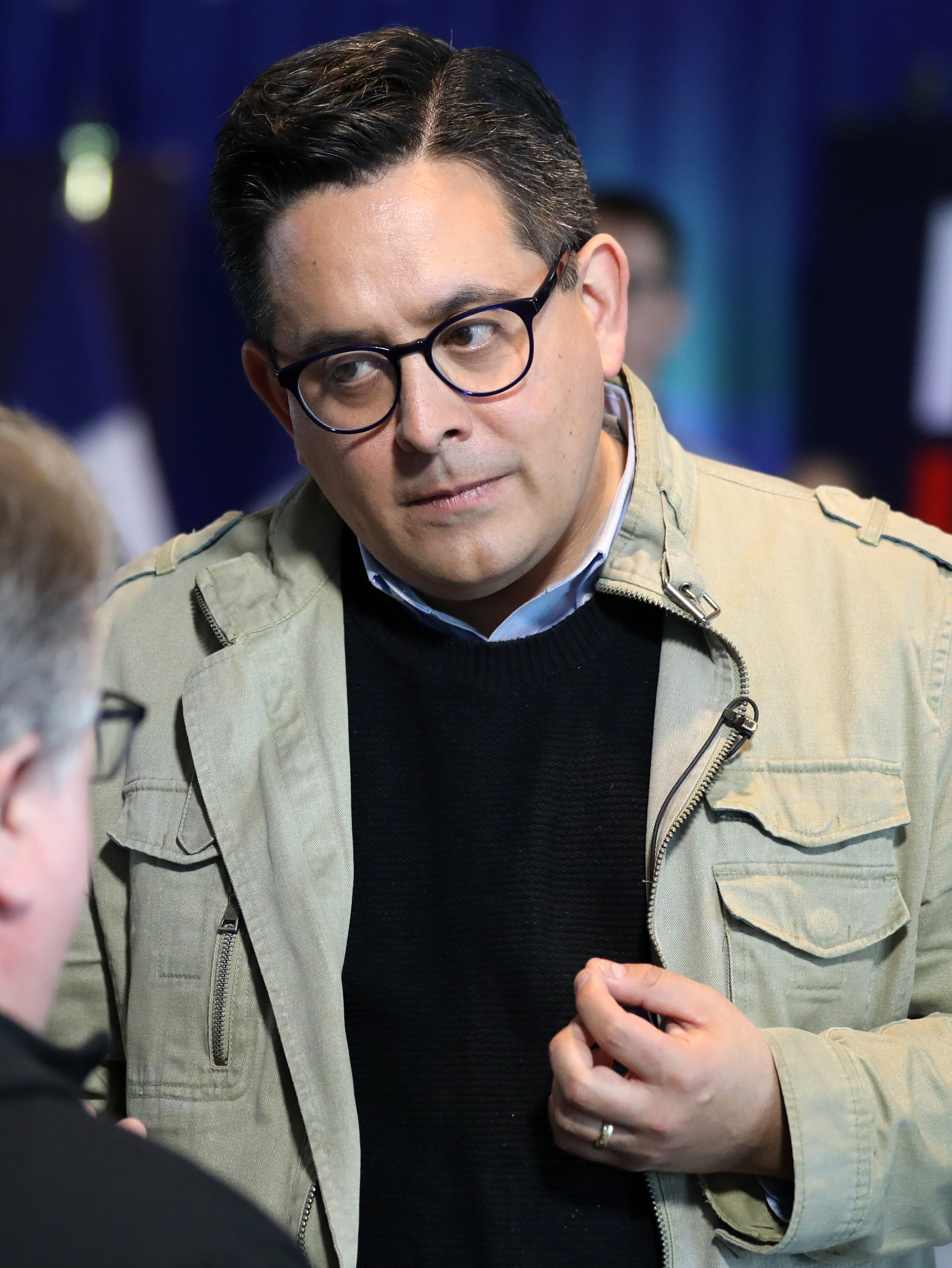
- O'Keefe in 2023
- Born: March 28, 1983 (age 42); Albany, New York, U.S.
- Education: American University
- Occupation: Political correspondent
- Employer: CBS News
- Known for: Regularly appears on The CBS Evening News, CBS This Morning, Face the Nation, CBSN and Washington Week on PBS

Ed O'Keefe (born March 28, 1983) is an American senior White House and political correspondent with CBS News. He joined CBS in 2018 after working nearly 13 years at The Washington Post.

== Early life ==
O'Keefe was born and raised in Delmar, New York, where he attended Bethlehem Central High School (1997–2001).

In 2005, O’Keefe earned a bachelor's degree from American University in interdisciplinary studies (Communications, Legal Institutions, Economics and Government) from the university's School of Public Affairs.

== Career ==
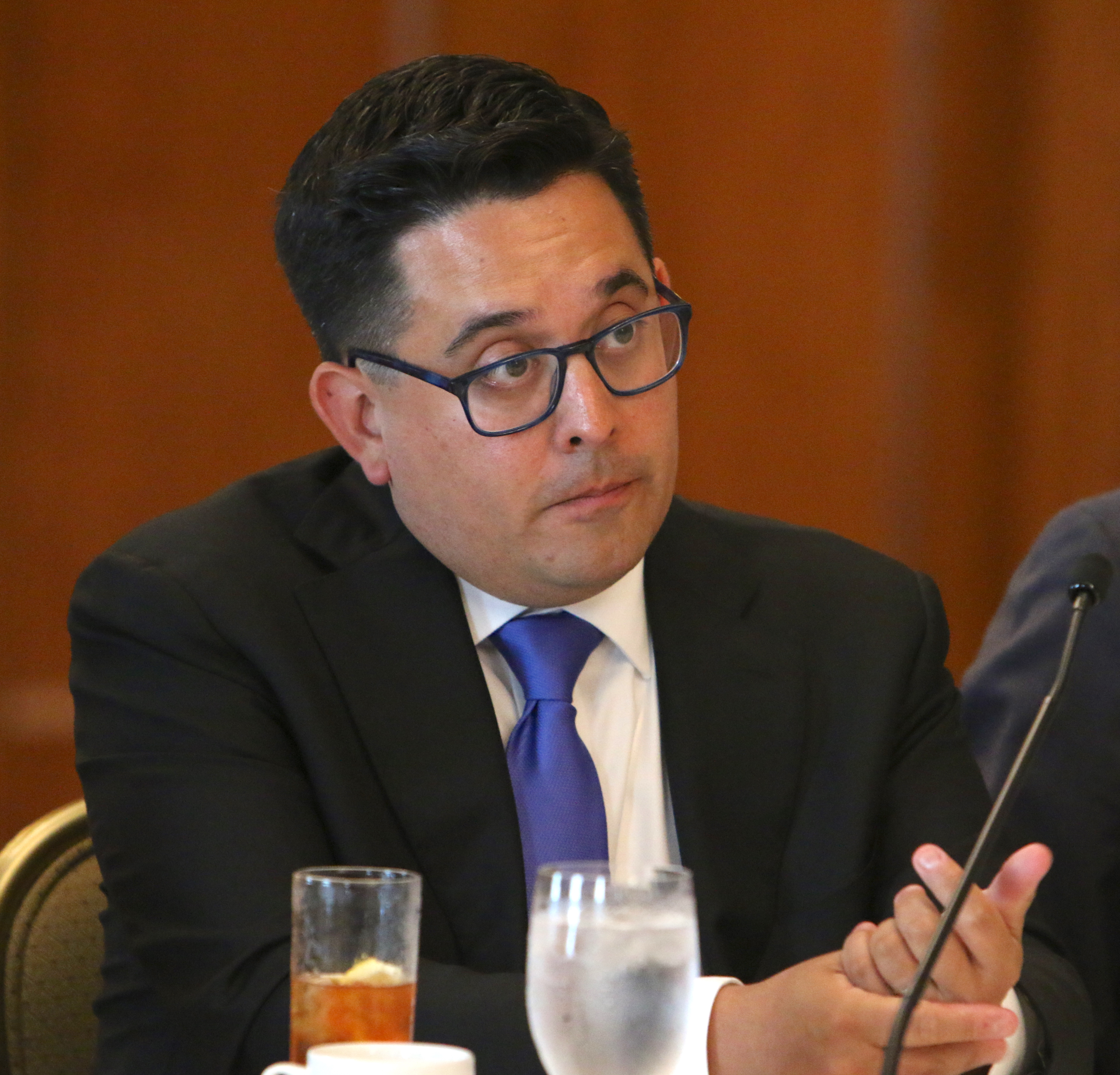
O'Keefe in 2019

In 2005, The Washington Post hired Ed O’Keefe as a home page editor. Later he served Washington Post Radio as a producer and on-air contributor before covering the 2008 presidential campaign as a multiplatform reporter contributing blog reports and video dispatches from the campaign trail while also producing and hosting The Post's first podcast, “The Post Politics Podcast” that also aired on Sirius XM's POTUS Channel. After the elections, he spent four years covering federal agencies and federal employees as author of The Federal Eye blog. He spent part of the summer of 2011 covering the war in Iraq before shifting to cover Congress. He covered the 2016 presidential campaign with a focus on Republican candidates and later returned to covering Capitol Hill. Before being hired by CBS News, he frequently appeared as a guest or panelist on news programs on BBC, CBS, CNN, Fox News, France 24, MSNBC, NPR, PBS, and Sirius/XM.

In 2017, O'Keefe became a contributor to CBS News, and in 2018 joined CBS News full-time as a Washington-based political correspondent. He continues to serve as an occasional panelist on the PBS program Washington Week, including at times as co-moderator.

Since joining CBS News, O’Keefe has covered the 2018 midterm elections, with reports from across the country and contributed to coverage of other major events in Washington including the State of the Union, the confirmation hearings for Supreme Court nominee Brett Kavanaugh, dramatic testimony from former Donald Trump associate Michael Cohen. He covered the funerals of former Sen. John McCain (R-Ariz.) and former president George H. W. Bush.

In the early months of the 2020 presidential campaign cycle, O’Keefe interviewed several candidates including Republican William Weld and Democrats Steve Bullock, Julian Castro, Kamala Harris, Kirsten Gillibrand, Amy Klobuchar, Bernie Sanders and Elizabeth Warren. In his first national television interview on the subject, Maryland Gov. Larry Hogan told O’Keefe he was strongly considering a Republican primary challenge to President Trump, but later dropped plans to run. O’Keefe also interviewed independent Howard Schultz in the early days of the former Starbucks CEO's exploratory phase.
