= Bethlehem Central High School =

Public high school in Albany County, New York

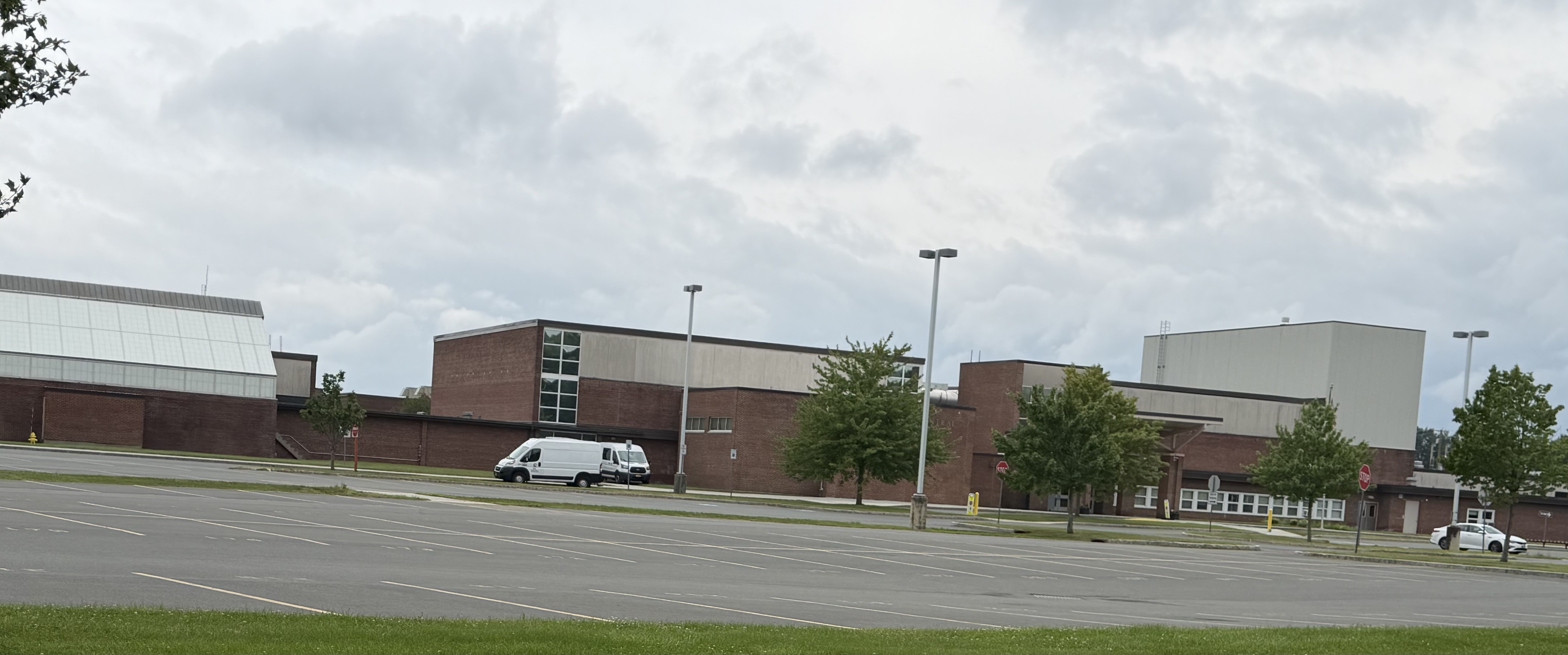

Location
- 700 Delaware Avenue, Delmar, Albany County, New York 12054; United States; 42°36′39.32″N 73°51′24.30″W

Information
- School type: Public, high school
- Established: 1928
- School district: Bethlehem Central School District
- Principal: Matt Urban
- Teaching staff: 97.57 (FTE) (2016-17)
- Grades: 9-12
- Enrollment: 1,630 (2016-17)
- Student to teacher ratio: 16.71∶1 (2016-17)
- Colors: Orange; Black
- Athletics conference: Suburban Council, Section II
- Mascot: Eagle
- Website: bethlehemschools.org/bethlehem-high-school/
- Last updated: February 9, 2019; 7 years ago

Bethlehem Central High School is a public high school in Delmar, New York, just south of Albany. Located at 700 Delaware Avenue, the school serves students in grades 9–12 from the towns of Bethlehem and New Scotland. The school was ranked 366 on Newsweek's 2013 "America's Best High Schools".

== History ==
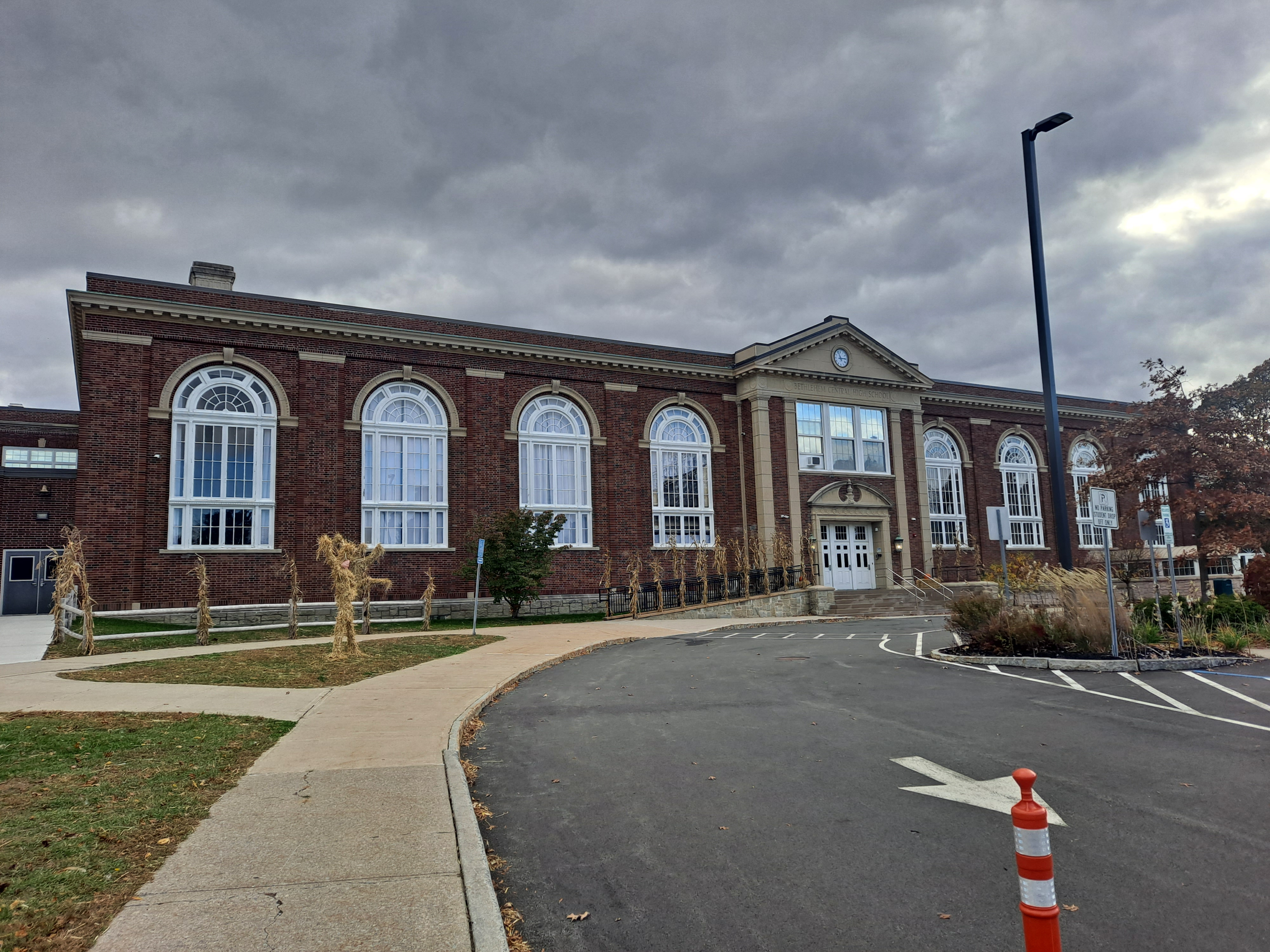
The original Bethlehem Central High School building, which is now home to the district's middle school.

The school was established in 1932 at 332 Kenwood Avenue. Within 20 years, the original building was deemed too small, and the school moved to its current location in 1954. (The former building now serves as the district's middle school although it still bears the inscription "Bethlehem Central High School".)

In 2006, the school forbade students to wear hats, hoods, bandannas, and handkerchiefs, saying that these can be gang symbols. This policy was met with considerable student protest, culminating in a petition that accumulated more than 1000 signatures in one day along with the addition of a permanent gate station to the school. The issue drew coverage in the Times Union and local television news formats.

In 2024, a series of 12 phone calls threatening violence were made to Bethlehem Central High School by a teenager in Halifax, Nova Scotia, Canada. These calls were part of coordinated swatting attempts intended to disrupt school activities.

== Extracurricular activities ==
The school's Science Bowl team finished first in their regional competition in 2006, 2009, 2010, 2013, 2015, 2016, 2017, 2018, 2019, 2021 earning them trips to the national competition in Washington, DC. Bethlehem students have also performed well in the Science Olympiad Tournaments, placing first in their regional competition and ninth at the New York States competition in 2021.

Bethlehem Central High School's Masterminds team has won several championships in their league. The Bethlehem Masterminds team won the state tournament in 2006, 2010, 2013, 2014, 2015, 2016, and 2017, making it the only team to have won states five years in a row.

Bethlehem students have also consistently performed well at the National History Bowl, having placed highly in its national championship each year since 2012. However, the History Bowl team is not funded by the school. Members of the History Bowl team have also done well at all-subject Quizbowl events, having won several in the 2014–15 school year.

== Athletics ==
Bethlehem Central School District believes that sports foster education, and supports more than 20 sports across three seasons. The district belongs to the New York State Athletic Association and competes as a Class AA school in Section II. BC's league affiliation is with the Suburban Scholastic Council, in which it competes in the gold division.

The Eagles compete in the following sports:

- Baseball
- Men's and Women's Basketball
- Men's and Women's Bowling
- Cheerleading
- Men's and Women's Cross Country
- Field Hockey
- Football
- Gymnastics
- Men's Golf
- Ice Hockey
- Men's and Women's Indoor Track
- Men's and Women's Lacrosse
- Men's and Women's Soccer
- Softball
- Men's and Women's Swimming
- Men's and Women's Tennis
- Men's and Women's Track and Field
- Men's and Women's Volleyball
- Men and Women's Wrestling
- Masterminds (Brain Sport)
- Science Bowl (Brain Sport)
- Science Olympiad (Brain Sport)
- Ultimate Frisbee

On June 20, 2006, funds for Ice Hockey, Cheerleading, and Gymnastics were cut from the budget. Supporters held multiple fund raisers for the teams, allowing all of them to play their sports by the season. The 2007 budget restored funding for these teams.

In 2006, the boys' soccer team made the Final 4 in the state championship. Four members of the girls' swim team made the state championship as well, placing 3rd in the 200-yard Medley Relay. That same year's boys' 200 freestyle relay was ranked 2nd in New York State and named All American.

In 2010, the boys Indoor Track team sent five athletes to the Nike Indoor Nationals in Boston.

Bethlehem Athletics has seen a rejuvenation in recent years. In 2018 the boys ice hockey team claimed the first section 2 title in program history following it up with a second consecutive title in 2019. The ice hockey team is joined by the boys tennis team (section 2 champions in '18 and '19) as well as girls soccer (section 2 champions in '18 and '19) as teams to capture back to back titles for the school. The girls' tennis team has claimed two back to back sectional championships, in 2021 and 2022. In 2021, the girls' tennis team competed for a States title, but finished 3rd in New York State. In 2022, the girls' tennis team placed 2nd in New York State. In 2024, the boy's varsity tennis team won the Section 2 title, defeating Shaker in a 6-3 win. The following year, the boy's team won the Section 2 title and then reached the finals of the NYSPHAA Team Tournament

== Lab School ==
Founded by James Nehring in 1992, the Lab School of Bethlehem Central High School is a school-within-a-school with a total of about 111 students in grades 9 through 12. Senior students participate in an internship, which must meet various educational requirements set by the school; they keep journals of their hours and experiences and hand it in at the end of the year for a grade.

Each year, the Lab School takes several field trips. Destinations include the Capital Repertory Theatre in Albany and the Adirondack Mountains YMCA Camps Chingachgook and Silver Bay. Each spring, the school takes a trip to either Williamsburg, Virginia; Washington, D.C.; Boston; or Philadelphia. Every two years, juniors and seniors take a week-long trip to the Florida Keys or Costa Rica to learn about marine biology.

In 2024, due to low enrollment and students facing scheduling conflicts, High School Superintendent Jody Monroe announced a phasing out of the Lab School Program.

== Notable alumni ==
=== Hall of Fame ===
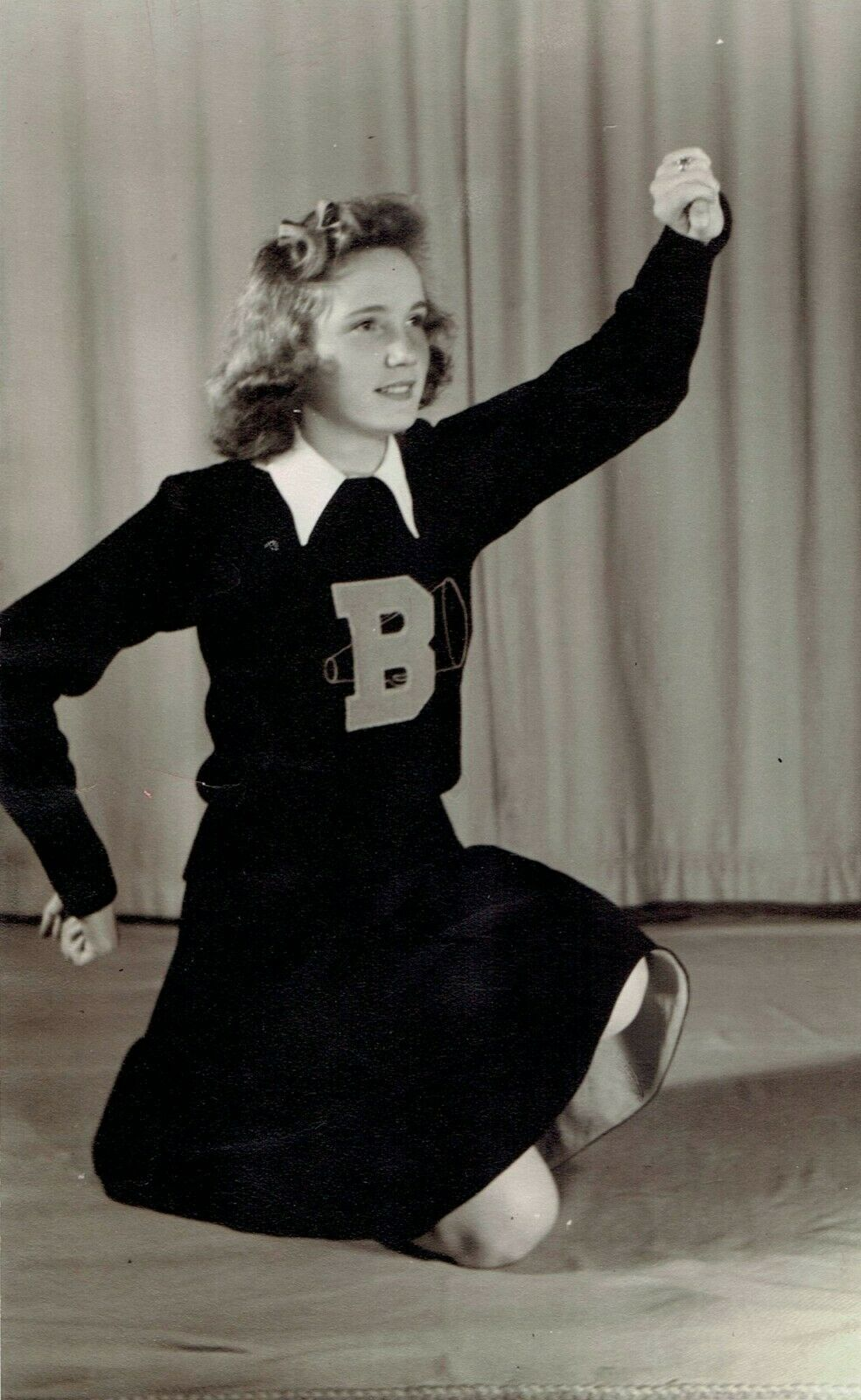
Eva Marie Saint

Alumni recognized by the school for induction into its hall of fame include:

- Dr. Richard Jadick (1983), osteopathic physician, completed a combat tour of duty in Iraq during 2004-05 as a lieutenant commander in the U.S. Navy Reserve; Jadick saved the lives of more than 30 Marines who were wounded during combat in Falluja, Iraq, and in January 2006, received the Bronze Star with “Combat V” device for heroic valor
- Megyn Kelly (1988), former host of Megyn Kelly Today a part of The Today Show on NBC; former Fox News anchor, featured on the cover of Vanity Fair
- Loretta Preska (1966), Senior United States district judge of the United States District Court for the Southern District of New York
- Matt Quatraro (1992), baseball player, coach, and manager
- Neal Shapiro (1976), former president of NBC News, where he oversaw global operations of NBC’s News division and news operations of MSNBC; won a George Polk Award, two Emmy awards and an Investigative Reporters and Editors award
- Eva Marie Saint (1942), actress who won an Oscar for Best Supporting Actress for her role in On the Waterfront (1954); she also starred in North by Northwest and other films, and continued to work in movies and television into her 90s
- Gerald Solomon (1948), chairman of the United States House Committee on Ways and Means

=== Others ===
- Robyn Adele Anderson (2007), singer in Postmodern Jukebox
- Emily Axford (2003), actress and producer
- James Charles (2017), Internet personality and makeup artist
- Claire Hutton (2023), soccer player
- Bill Karins (1992), NBC meteorologist
- Ed O'Keefe (2001), reporter for CBS News and previously The Washington Post
- Stephen G. Olmstead (1947), retired Lieutenant general in the Marine Corps
- Chris Porco (2002), convicted murderer
- Gary Samore (1971), served as President Barack Obama's White House Coordinator for Arms Control and Weapons of Mass Destruction
- Scott Sullivan (1979), WorldCom Inc.'s former chief financial officer, architect of its financial collapse
- Joseph M. Tucci, chairman, CEO, and president of EMC Corporation
- Peter C. Waterman (1946), American physicist
- Portia Wu (1987), secretary of the Maryland Department of Labor
