= Bethlehem, New York =

- Town
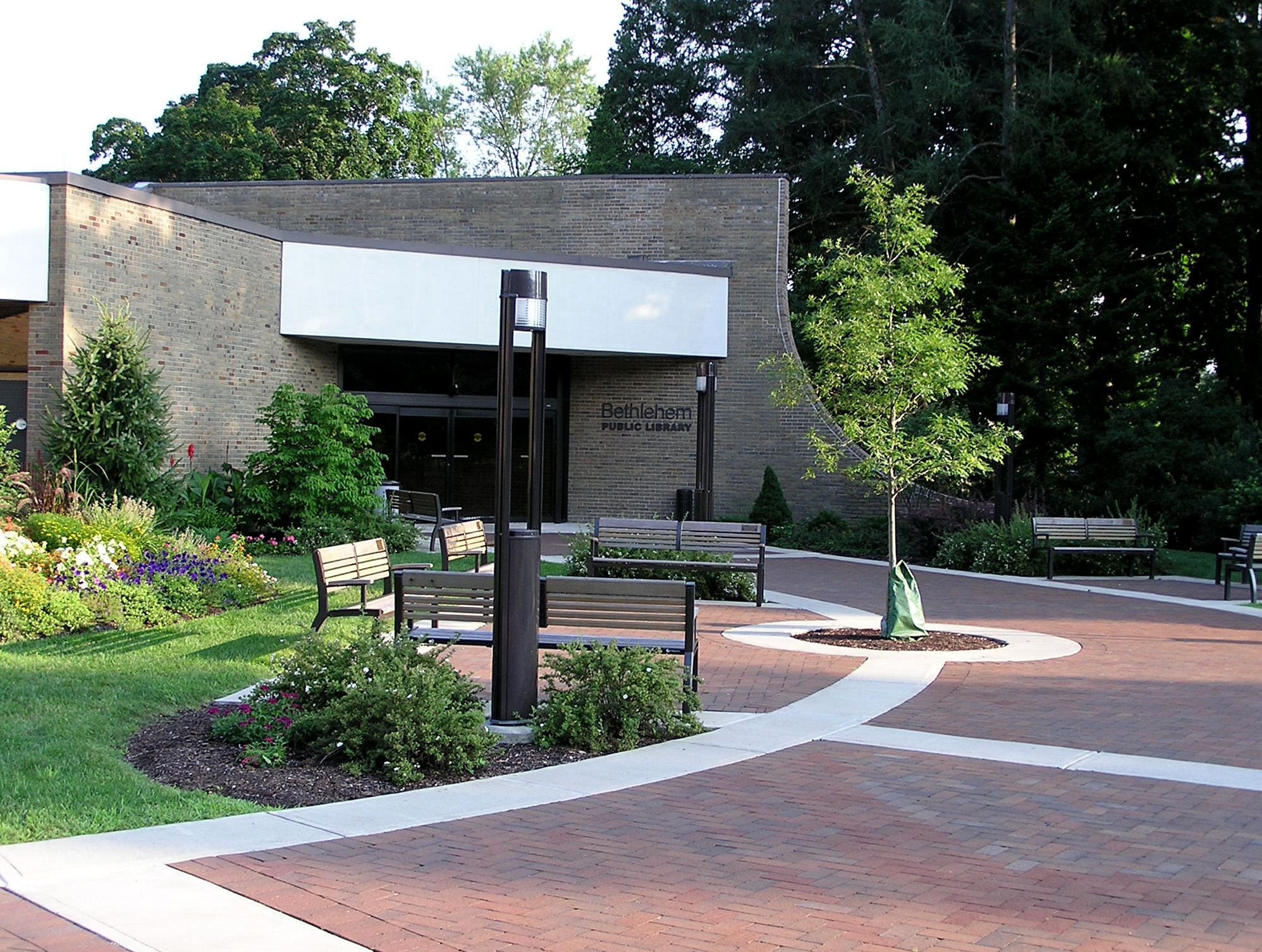
- Bethlehem Public Library

- Seal
- Interactive map of Bethlehem, New York
- Coordinates: 42°36′N 73°50′W
- Country: United States
- State: New York
- County: Albany
- Incorporated: 1793

Government
  - Type: Town council
  - Town supervisor: David VanLuven (D)
  - Town council: Members' list: • Joyce Becker (D); • Maureen Cunningham (D); • David R. DeCancio (D); • Tom Schnurr (D)

Area
  - Total: 49.87 sq mi (129.15 km^{2})
  - Land: 49.03 sq mi (126.99 km^{2})
  - Water: 0.83 sq mi (2.16 km^{2})
- Elevation: 200 ft (60 m)

Population (2020)
  - Total: 35,034
  - Density: 714.5/sq mi (275.88/km^{2})
- Time zone: UTC-5 (Eastern (EST))
  - Summer (DST): UTC-4 (EDT)
- ZIP Codes: 12054 (Delmar); 12077 (Glenmont); 12158 (Selkirk); 12159 (Slingerlands); 12161 (South Bethlehem); 12203 (Albany); 12143 (Ravena)
- Area code: 518
- FIPS code: 36-001-06354
- GNIS feature ID: 0978731
- Website: www.townofbethlehem.org

Bethlehem is a town in Albany County, New York, United States. The town's population was 35,034 at the 2020 census. Bethlehem is located immediately to the south of the city of Albany and includes the following hamlets: Delmar, Elsmere, Glenmont, North Bethlehem, Selkirk, Slingerlands, and South Bethlehem. U.S. Route 9W passes through the town. The town is named after the biblical Bethlehem.

== History ==
When Henry Hudson sailed up the river that would eventually bear his name, he is thought to have landed at what is now the town of Bethlehem. The spot where he is presumed to have landed is commemorated at the town's Henry Hudson Park. The town was established on March 12, 1793, from the town of Watervliet. In 1832, part of the town was used to form the town of New Scotland. The town's earliest growth took place in Normansville, named for its location along the Normans Kill, a creek, which forms the town's border with Albany. Normansville still exists today, though it is unnoticed by most living in Bethlehem since it is accessible only by one downhill road. In the mid-19th century, the Delaware and Hudson railroad initiated Albany - Binghamton service (Susquehanna Division) through the hamlet then called Adamsville, renaming the hamlet Delmar. Delmar has become the most populous hamlet and its Delaware Avenue is the site of the present day town hall, police station, justice court, and public library, as well as numerous businesses.

The Delaware and Hudson discontinued passenger service in 1963, and its tracks started being removed in the year 2000, with the last of the track removed in 2005. The track right-of-way is now the Albany County Rail trail, a bike and pedestrian path, that runs from downtown Albany to Voorheesville. The town has continued to grow, and is today considered to be an affluent suburb of the city of Albany.

== Local landmarks ==
The town includes several historic buildings and landmarks.

- Four Corners: This Delmar intersection of Delaware and Kenwood avenues has served as the town's traditional center. It is the location of several stores, banks, restaurants and the post office. It is within walking distance of most Delmar residents.
- Adams House: In 1838 Nathaniel Adams built a hotel on Delaware Avenue. This stately building later served as the town hall. In 1980, the Town Hall moved to a larger location, and the volunteer fire department took over the building. Until 2016, Adams House was used as the headquarters of the New York State Association of Retarded Citizens, when it was sold to the Bethlehem Chabad, an Orthodox Jewish assembly. The Delmar Fire Department maintains the fire station to the rear of the structure, at the intersection of Nathaniel and Adams streets.
- Beckers Homestead: Albertus Becker built this house in 1800. His grandson, Albertus Becker II, was elected town supervisor in 1863.
- Bethlehem House: listed on the National Register of Historic Places (NRHP) in 1973.
- District School No. 1: listed on the NRHP in 1998.
- First Reformed Dutch Church of Bethlehem: listed on the NRHP in 2002.
- Memorial Park: A small pocket park along Delaware Avenue to honor the town's war veterans. The park provides pedestrian access to the old Delaware and Hudson railway bed. The railway bed is being converted to a bike trail (rails to trails program) as funds become available.
- Elm Avenue Park: The town's largest park, it is a popular summertime gathering point. It includes three outdoor swimming pools, a splash zone for toddlers, playground for kids basketball and tennis courts. Winter activities include ice skating, hockey, cross country skiing, sledding, and snowmobiling. Admission to the pool area is restricted to town residents and their guests under a fee-based system.
- Bethlehem Central Middle School: This was built as the senior high school in the Federal style. Over the years it has had several additions. Its facilities include outdoor tennis courts, basketball courts, softball fields, running track, cross country trails, and soccer fields. These facilities are open to the public when the school is not in session. The high school was moved to a new building and this was adapted as a middle school.
- Delaware Plaza: A shopping plaza built in the 1950s, located on Delaware Avenue in Elsmere. Delaware Plaza is home to a large supermarket (Hannaford) as well as some 30 other shops and restaurants.
- Delmar post office: Built in the late 1930s during the Depression, it is the only one of the 13 Colonial Revival-style New York post offices designed by Louis Simon to lack a cupola.
- Albany County Helderberg-Hudson Rail Trail: Made from the preexisting path of the Delaware and Hudson railroad. The tracks have since been removed and is currently paved from Tollgate in New Scotland to the Port of Albany (roughly the Corner of Lexi Lane and S. Pearl Street).

== Politics ==
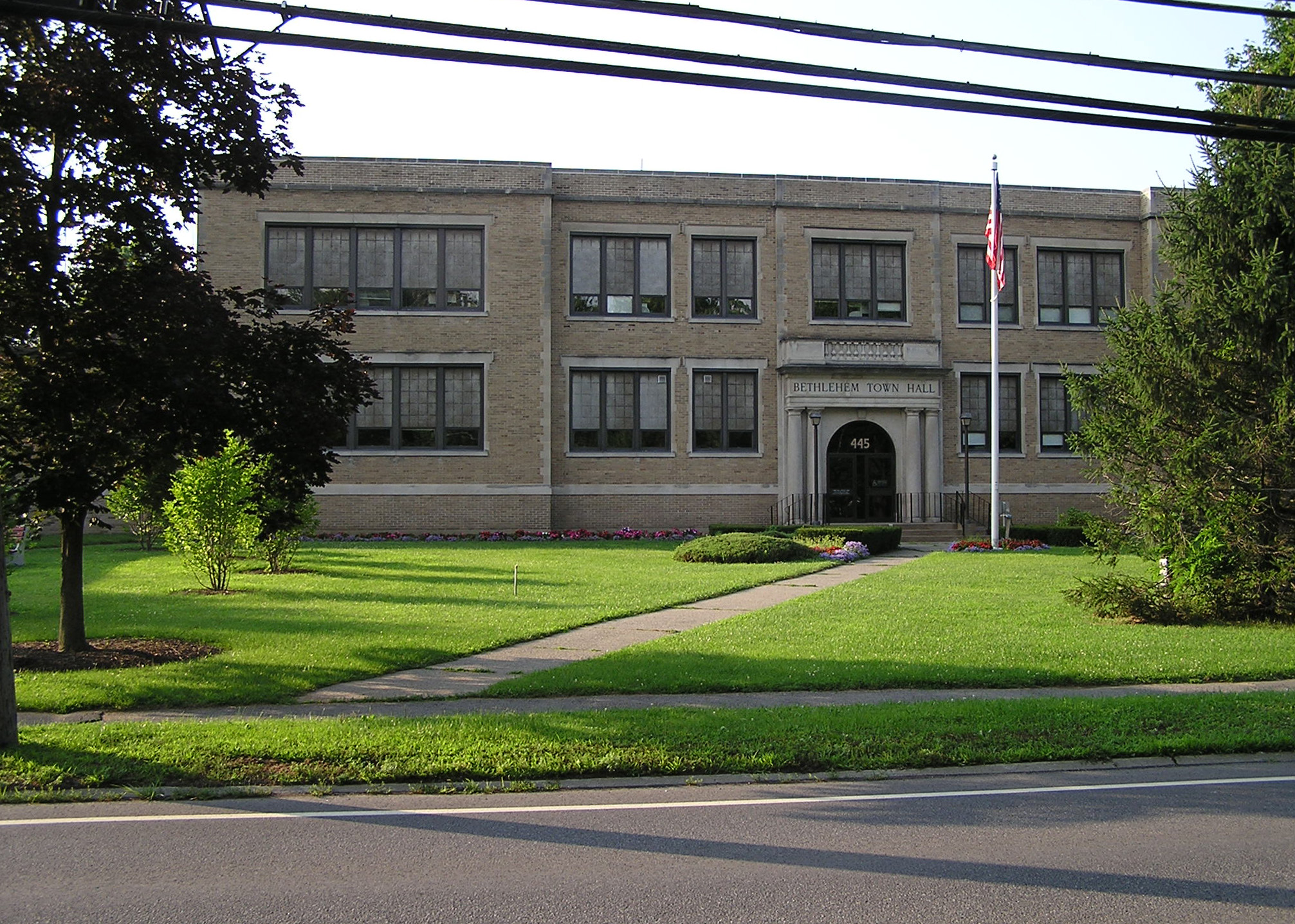
Bethlehem Town Hall

Town government had been dominated for over 120 years by the Republican Party. That changed in 2003 with the election of Democrat Theresa Egan as town supervisor. On the town board, Democrat Dan Plummer, along with Independence Party member Tim Gordon, created a new working Democratic majority for the first time in recollection. The Democrats further solidified their majority in 2005. On April 11, 2007, Supervisor Egan resigned her position in favor of a high-level appointment to the New York State Department of Motor Vehicles, and Jack Cunningham was appointed supervisor by the board. Cunningham was elected to the position in the fall of 2007, then ran for reelection in November 2009, when he was defeated by council member Sam Messina. Messina, a member of the Independence Party (and former member of the Democratic Party), ran on the Republican line.

When the Republican Party chose to endorse Democratic town board member Kyle Kotary for town supervisor in May 2011, then-Supervisor Messina announced he would not seek reelection. John Clarkson defeated Kotary in the Democratic primary for the supervisor position in September 2011, and Clarkson subsequently defeated Kotary, running on the Republican line, in the general election in November 2011. Clarkson was sworn in as Bethlehem's supervisor on January 2, 2012. He served 3 terms and was succeeded by Democrat David VanLuven, who was first elected in November 2017. He ran unopposed for reelection in 2019.

Following the 2019 elections, Democrats were reelected to the town supervisor position, the town clerk position, the receiver of taxes position, both town justices and three of four seats on the town board. Additionally, a Democrat, Marc Dorsey, was elected superintendent of highways.

In the 2021 election, Democrats won all town offices: supervisor, clerk, town justice, superintendent of highways, and two town board seats. Following this election, Democrats control every local elected position in the town.

== Education ==
Most town residents live within the Bethlehem Central School District. The town operates five public elementary schools – Eagle, Elsmere, Glenmont, Hamagrael, and Slingerlands. A sixth elementary school, Clarksville, was closed indefinitely at the end of the 2010–2011 school year. The building remains property of the Bethlehem Central School District and is currently leased to the Albany County Sheriff's Department. According to the District web site, Clarksville school will remain closed for the indefinite future due to declining enrollment and economic issues.

Bethlehem Central School District Elementary schools include students up to grade 5. The Bethlehem Central Middle School educates children in grades 6, 7 and 8, while the Bethlehem Central High School includes grades 9–12.

The town also includes the School of Saint Thomas the Apostle, a Catholic school for grades K–8 located across from the Catholic Church. Additionally, an independent school known as Bethlehem Children's School exists for students in K–8, offering a creative, child centered environmental education approach to learning.

The school district offers Continuing Education classes in a variety of topics for adult learners of all ages. The school district also provides busing and most textbooks for families who choose to educate their children in private schools.

Residents in the hamlet of North Bethlehem are part of the Guilderland Central School District. Residents in the hamlets of Selkirk and South Bethlehem are part of the Ravena-Coeymans-Selkirk Central School District. One of the two elementary schools of the district, Albertus W. Becker Elementary School, is in Selkirk.

== Geography ==
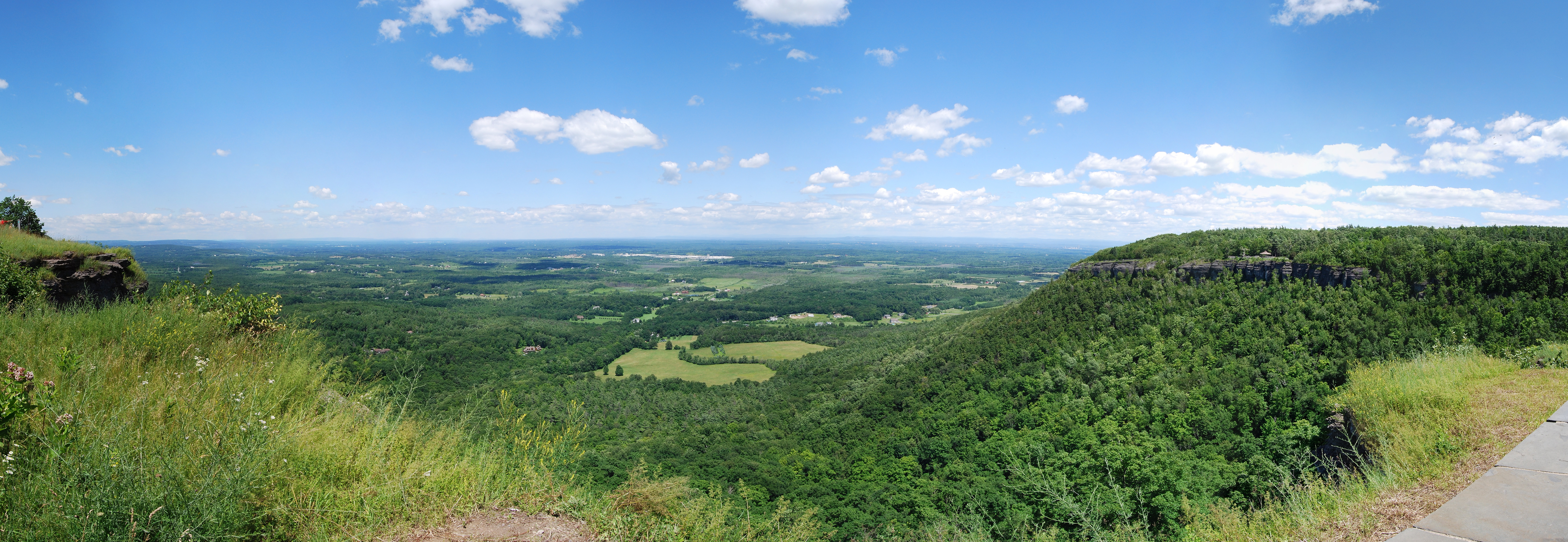
View of Bethlehem and New Scotland from Thacher Park

According to the United States Census Bureau, the town has a total area of 49.6 square miles (128 km^{2}), of which 48.8 square miles (126 km^{2}) is land and 0.8 square miles (2.1 km^{2}) (1.55%) is water.

=== Location and adjacent areas ===
The town is in Albany County, New York. The eastern town line, defined by the Hudson River, is the border of Rensselaer County. To the north, the town shares a border with Albany, and the town of Guilderland. To the west is the town of New Scotland, and to the south is the town of Coeymans.

The New York State Thruway (Interstate 87) passes through the town. The town is also served by the CDTA number 13 (New Scotland Avenue), 18 (Delaware Avenue), and 19 (Voorheesville) buses.

== Demographics ==
Historical population
Census	Pop.	Note	%±
1810	4,430		—
1820	5,114		15.4%
1830	6,082		18.9%
1840	3,238		−46.8%
1850	4,102		26.7%
1860	5,644		37.6%
1870	6,950		23.1%
1880	3,752		−46.0%
1890	4,187		11.6%
1900	4,226		0.9%
1910	4,413		4.4%
1920	4,430		0.4%
1930	7,160		61.6%
1940	9,782		36.6%
1950	13,065		33.6%
1960	18,936		44.9%
1970	23,427		23.7%
1980	24,296		3.7%
1990	27,552		13.4%
2000	31,304		13.6%
2010	33,656		7.5%
2020	35,034		4.1%
U.S. Decennial Census

As of the census of 2000, there were 31,304 people, 12,112 households, and 8,551 families residing in the town. The population density was 641.3 inhabitants per square mile (247.6/km^{2}). There were 12,459 housing units at an average density of 255.2 per square mile (98.5/km^{2}). The racial makeup of the town was 94.74% White, 2.26% African American, 0.15% Native American, 1.66% Asian, 0.04% Pacific Islander, 0.31% from other races, and 0.84% from two or more races. Hispanic or Latino of any race were 1.74% of the population.

There were 12,112 households, out of which 36.6% had children under the age of 18 living with them, 60.0% were married couples living together, 8.0% had a female householder with no husband present, and 29.4% were non-families. 25.0% of all households were made up of individuals, and 11.7% had someone living alone who was 65 years of age or older. The average household size was 2.53 and the average family size was 3.06.

In the town, the population was spread out, with 27.5% under the age of 18, 5.2% from 18 to 24, 27.1% from 25 to 44, 25.8% from 45 to 64, and 14.4% who were 65 years of age or older. The median age was 40 years. For every 100 females, there were 90.9 males. For every 100 females age 18 and over, there were 85.5 males.

The median income for a household in the town was $63,169, and the median income for a family was $77,211. Males had a median income of $52,433 versus $36,739 for females. The per capita income for the town was $31,492. About 2.3% of families and 3.1% of the population were below the poverty line, including 3.6% of those under age 18 and 2.8% of those age 65 or over.

== Notable people ==
- E. G. Squier (1821–1888), archaeologist and newspaper editor
- Megyn Kelly, NBC, formerly Fox News anchor, Bethlehem Central graduate
- Eva Marie Saint (1924–2026), American actress who starred in films, on Broadway, and on television
- James Charles, makeup artist, first male spokesmodel for CoverGirl, Bethlehem Central graduate
- Josh Eppard, drummer of Coheed & Cambria
- Frances S. Curry, United States Medal of Honor recipient. Lived in Selkirk
- Matt Quatraro, manager, Kansas City Royals
- Bill Karins, NBC News meteorologist
- Ed O'Keefe, CBS News political correspondent
- Claire Hutton, Professional soccer player who plays for Bay FC
- Emily Axford, American actress, writer, and producer

== Communities and locations in Bethlehem ==
=== Official Hamlets ===
- Delmar: hamlet near the center of the town and the location of the town government. Formerly known as Adamsville.*
- Elsmere: hamlet east of and adjacent to Delmar.
- Glenmont: hamlet in the eastern part of the town.
- North Bethlehem: hamlet at the north town line in the northeastern part of the town.
- Selkirk: hamlet east of South Bethlehem.
- Slingerlands: hamlet immediately west of Delmar and near the western town line.
- South Bethlehem: hamlet in the southern part of the town.

=== Unofficial Hamlets ===
- Beckers Corners: hamlet in the south part of the town at Route 9W.
- Bethlehem Center: hamlet in the northeastern part of the town.
- Bethlehem Heights: community east of South Bethlehem, and often associated with it.
- Callahans Corners: location at the southwestern corner of the town.
- Cedar Hill: hamlet in the southeastern part of the town, east of the Thruway.
- Henry Hudson Park: park east of Cedar Hill at the Hudson River.
- Houcks Corners: hamlet south of Delmar.
- Mallorys Corners: location in the southern part of the town.
- Meyers Corners: location in the southern section of the town.
- Normansville: hamlet in the northern part of the town.
- Spawn Hollow: community in the southwestern corner of the town, often associated with South Bethlehem.
- South Albany: hamlet in the southern section of the town, north of South Bethlehem.
- Wemple: hamlet in the southeastern part of the town.

== Electric power facilities ==
=== Bethlehem Energy Center ===
Pursuant to Article X of the Public Service Law, PSEG Energy Resource & Trade LLC (originally filed by Niagara Mohawk Power Corporation (NMPC) in 1998) was granted a Certificate of Environmental Compatibility and Public Need for a 750-megawatt (MW) combined cycle natural gas powered plant in 2002. The project went into service in July 2005. There are three combustion turbines whose exhaust creates steam to drive a steam turbine. All of the turbines are manufactured by General Electric. It uses an air-cooled condenser to reduce water draw. It is located on a 186-acre former industrial area that was owned by NMPC and housed the former 376 MW coal-powered Albany Steam Station. NMPC sold the land to PSEG in 2000. In 2017, the Bethlehem Energy Center (BEC), as it is also known, injected 5,303 GWh of electric energy into the electric transmission system. This is equivalent to operating at full capacity for approximately 73.4% of the year. For comparison, the capital region consumed 11,823 GWh of electric energy in 2017. Its power is sold into the electric wholesale market administered by the NYISO.

As a requirement of its certificate, PSEG created an estuary to offset the industrial development of the plant (1.5 acres of new wetland for every acre of newly industrialized area) with fish stocking included.

In 2015, the BEC filed for an amendment of their Article X certificate to increase the certificate power generation amount by around 36 MW. This increase corresponded to an upgrade in turbine components and software from GE. A noise study was commissioned to evaluate any possible noise impact on the local community. The amendment was granted noting that there would not be an increase in air emissions or facility footprint. There was a corresponding 78.1 MW increase in its summer capacity market offering capability between the 2015 NYISO Gold Book and the 2018 NYISO Gold Book. In its 2018 adopted budget, the Town of Bethlehem noted a revenue of $214,941 from payments in lieu of taxes most of which can be assumed to come from the BEC. For comparison, the Town of Bethlehem noted a total budget of about $42 million for 2018.
