= Bethlehem Central School District =

School district in the U.S. state of New York

Coordinates: 42°36′45″N 73°51′27″W

Address
- 700 Delaware Ave Delmar, New York, 12054; United States

District information
- Type: Public
- Grades: K-12
- Established: 1930; 96 years ago
- Superintendent: Jody Monroe
- Asst. superintendent(s): David Hurst
- Business administrator: John McPhillips
- Budget: $97.1 Million (USD)

Students and staff
- Enrollment: 4,075 (as of 2024-2025 school year)
- Student–teacher ratio: 14:1
- District mascot: Eagle
- Colors: Orange and Black

Other information
- Website: www.bethlehemschools.org

The Bethlehem Central School District is a public school district in New York State, serving approximately 4,100 students just south of Albany in the towns of Bethlehem and New Scotland in Albany County with a staff of 800+ and a budget of $114 million.

The average class size ranges from 12 to 30 students and the student-teacher ratio is 14:1.

The district's main office is located in Delmar, New York. Jody Monroe is currently the Superintendent. David Hurst is the Deputy Superintendent.

== Board of Education ==
The Board of Education (BOE) consists of 7 members who reside in the Bethlehem Central School District. Members serve rotating 3-year terms. Elections are held each May for board members and to vote on the School District Budget.

== History ==
The district was founded in 1930.

== Schools ==
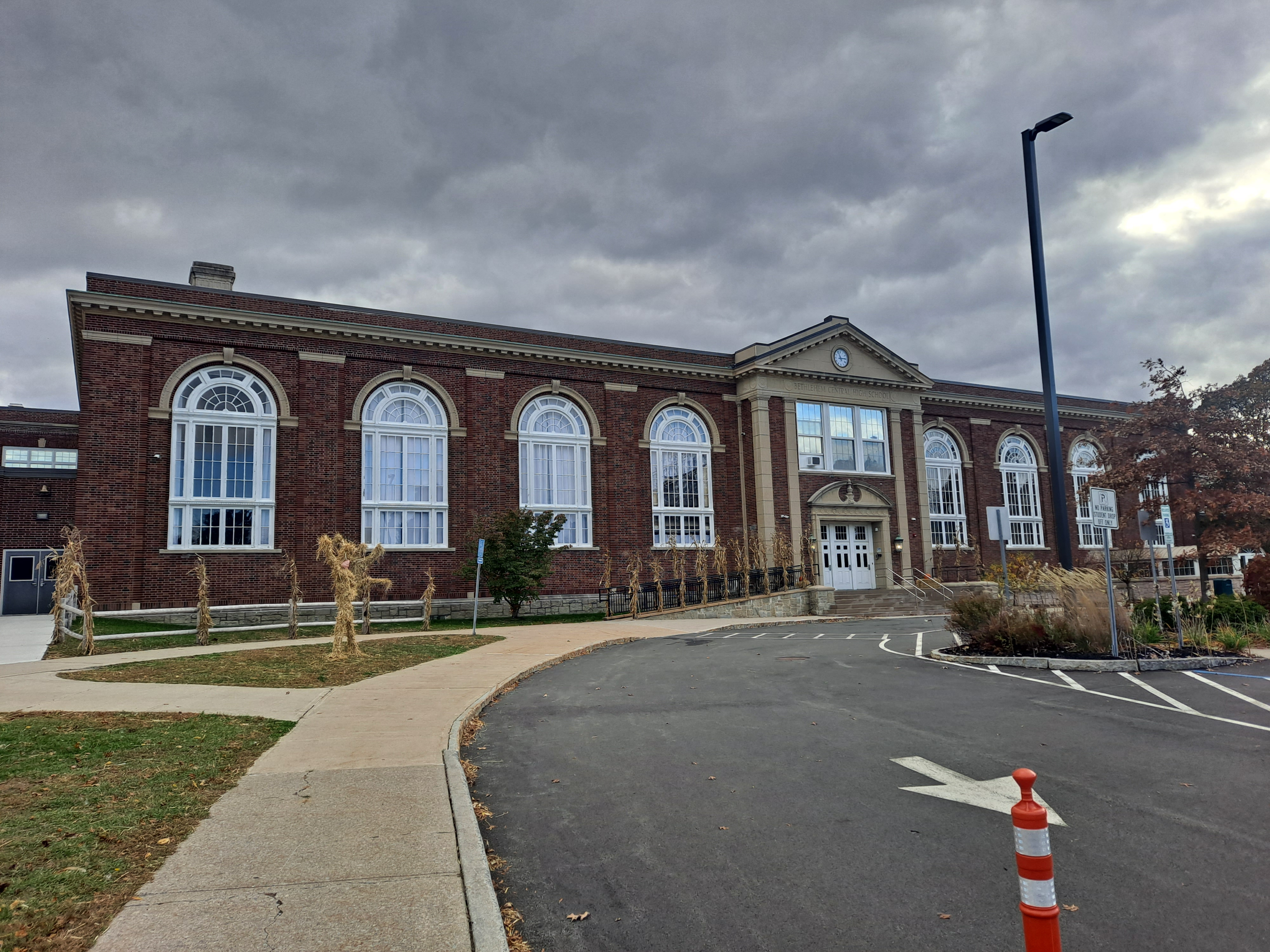
The Bethlehem Central Middle School building, which once housed the district's high school.

The Bethlehem Central School District currently operates five neighborhood elementary schools, one middle school, and one high school across the district. Three elementary schools have been named National Blue Ribbon Schools for academic excellence.

=== Elementary Schools (K-5) ===
- Eagle Elementary School, Principal - David Doemel, Jr.
- Elsmere Elementary School, Principal - Andrew Baker
- Glenmont Elementary School, Principal - Laura Heffernan
- Hamagrael Elementary School, Principal - Ian Knox
- Slingerlands Elementary School, Principal - Katherine Kloss

=== Middle school (6-8) ===
- Bethlehem Central Middle School, Principal - Michael Klugman, Ed.D.; Assistant Principal - Nicole Conway; Assistant Principal - Jacqueline Munroe

=== High school (9-12) ===
- Bethlehem Central High School, Principal - Matthew Urban; Assistant Principal - Heather Culnan; Assistant Principal - Kimberly Sparkman

== Building project ==
On December 2, 2003, district residents approved a construction and renovation project. This $92.9 million project includes additions, renovations and alterations to all school buildings, the bus garage and education center. It also includes building a new elementary school to accommodate the growing population, and computer network infrastructure improvements.

In 2013, residents passed a proposed project of more than $20 million and in 2016, a facilities improvement project valued at $32 million was approved. The 2016 project included an $8 million renovation of the high school auditorium. The most recent facilities improvement project total $41 million and was approved in fall 2021.
