= New York State Route 32 =

North-south highway in New York's Hudson Valley

New York State Route 32
- NY 32 highlighted in red, with older alignments that are now reference routes in pink

Route information
- Maintained by NYSDOT, Albany County and several cities
- Length: 176.73 mi (284.42 km)
- Existed: 1930–present
- Tourist routes: Lakes to Locks Passage; Mohawk Towpath Scenic Byway

Major junctions
- South end: Future I-86 / US 6 / NY 17 in Woodbury
- I-84 / NY 52 / US 9W in Newburgh; US 44 / NY 55 in Plattekill; I-587 / NY 28 in Kingston; I-87 Toll / New York Thruway / NY 212 / CR 31 in Saugerties; NY 23 in Cairo; US 9 / US 20 in Albany; US 4 near Troy; NY 67 in Mechanicville; NY 29 in Schuylerville; US 9 / NY 9L in Glens Falls
- North end: NY 196 near Hudson Falls

Location
- Country: United States
- State: New York
- Counties: Orange, Ulster, Greene, Albany, Saratoga, Warren, Washington

Highway system
- New York Highways; Interstate; US; State; Reference; Parkways
| ← NY 31F | → NY 32A |

New York State Route 32 (NY 32) is a north–south state highway that extends for 176.73 miles (284.42 km) through the Hudson Valley and Capital District regions of the U.S. state of New York. It is a two-lane surface road for nearly its entire length, with few divided sections. From Harriman to Albany, it is closely parallel to Interstate 87 (I-87) and U.S. Route 9W (US 9W), overlapping with the latter in several places.

NY 32 begins at NY 17 on the outskirts of the New York metropolitan area in Woodbury just outside Harriman, and ends at NY 196 east of Hudson Falls just south of the Adirondacks. In between, the road passes through the cities of Newburgh, Kingston, Albany, Cohoes, and Glens Falls. Outside of the cities, it offers views of the Hudson Highlands, Shawangunk Ridge, Catskill Mountains, and, during an overlap with US 4 north of Albany, the Hudson River.

The roads now making up the highway were originally part of several privately maintained turnpikes, which fostered settlements along the corridor. Once part of the former NY 58, it has been NY 32 since 1930. Only one of three letter-suffixed spur routes remains.

== Route description ==
Maintenance of NY 32 is split between the New York State Department of Transportation (NYSDOT) and the highway departments of several different jurisdictions. Within the cities of Newburgh and Watervliet, the route is entirely city-maintained. In four other cities—Albany, Cohoes, Glens Falls, and Kingston—NY 32 is mostly locally maintained. The piece of the route in the city of Mechanicville, meanwhile, is city-maintained north of Frances Street, a local street four blocks south of NY 67. One last locally maintained section exists in the Albany suburb of Bethlehem, where the route is county-maintained between Feura Bush Road and the Delmar Bypass. This section is co-signed as County Route 52 (CR 52), which continues northwest of NY 32 to a junction with NY 140 near Slingerlands.

=== Harriman to Newburgh ===
NY 32 begins where NY 17 leaves the Quickway overpass west of the New York State Thruway toll barrier, just north of the Harriman village line in Woodbury. To the east is Woodbury Common Premium Outlets, across from Central Valley Elementary School of the Monroe–Woodbury Central School District. Beyond the mall, site of many major traffic jams, NY 32 descends into downtown Central Valley. 2 miles (3 km) north is another of the Town of Woodbury's hamlets, Highland Mills. Beyond the Rushmore Memorial Library at the north end of the hamlet the road bends slightly east upon reaching the southeastern foot of Orange County's highest peak, Schunemunk Mountain.

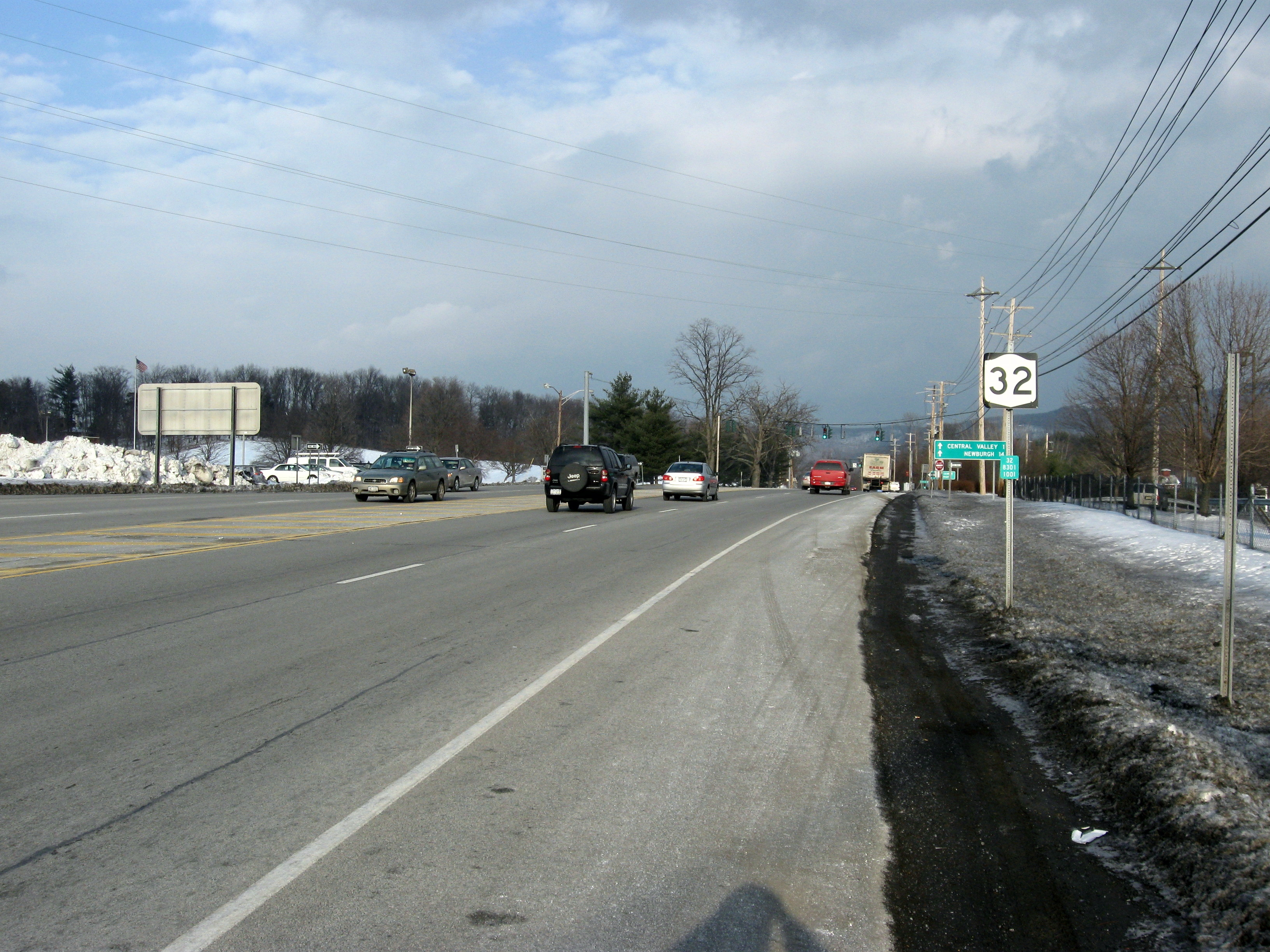
NY 32 begins in Woodbury.

Shortly after Highland Mills, the Port Jervis Line, operated by Metro-North Railroad, crosses over on a high trestle. After crossing over Woodbury Creek and under the Thruway, NY 32 runs along the eastern side of the narrow valley between Schunemunk and the Hudson Highlands. This section of highway runs through mostly wooded terrain as it leaves Woodbury for Cornwall.

Just north of Mountainville and the north end of Schunemunk, the road crosses Moodna Creek downstream from the Woodbury Creek confluence. The intersection with Angola Road 0.25 miles (0.40 km) to the south was once the beginning of the former NY 307; it is now the west end of CR 107. Across the creek from CR 107 is Orrs Mills Road, another county road that leads to Storm King Art Center.

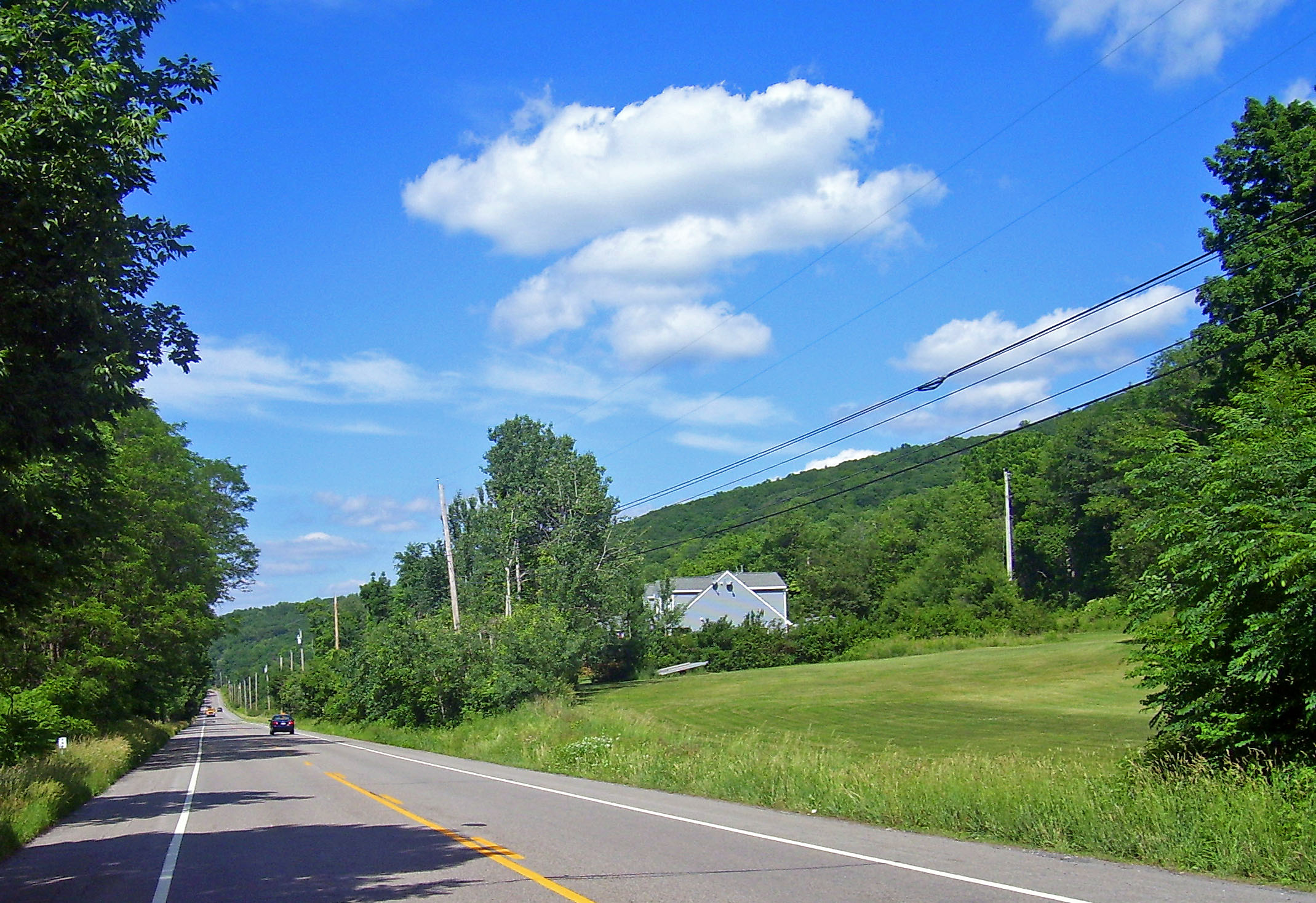
NY 32 in the Woodbury Creek valley

The road climbs gently out of the creek valley and enters development. At 1.6 miles (2.6 km) north of Angola Road, it crosses the New Windsor town line and reaches the complicated five-way intersection at the center of Vails Gate, intersecting NY 94 and the beginning of NY 300. The next 2 miles (3.2 km) include a middle turn lane as NY 32 becomes New Windsor's main commercial strip. This section ends at Temple Hill Avenue, with Snake Hill to the west. The road remains heavily commercial as it enters the city of Newburgh as the wide Lake Street.

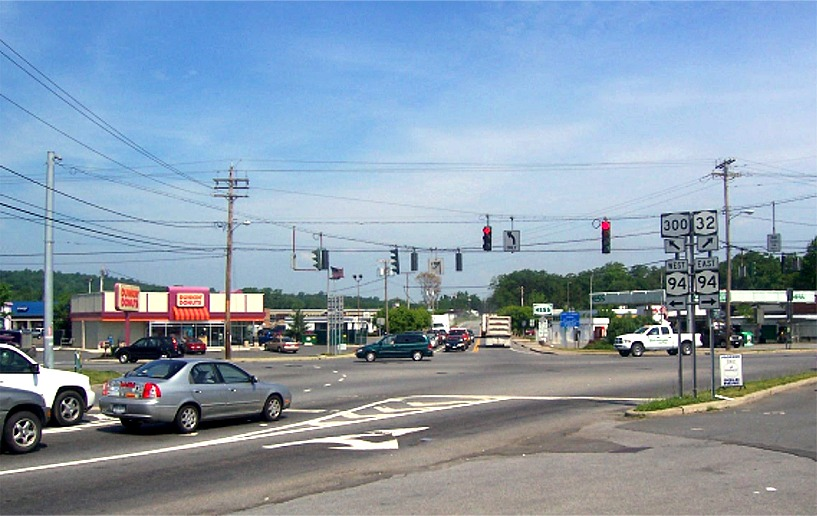
Vails Gate

At Broadway (NY 17K), Newburgh's main street, NY 32 turns east. The brief, unsigned concurrency ends where 17K terminates at US 9W (Robinson Avenue), at the former Broadway School. NY 32, however, turns north again, beginning the first of several concurrencies with US 9W.

The two highways remain joined for the next 1.2 miles (1.9 km) as they pass the Frederick Law Olmsted and Calvert Vaux-designed Downing Park and reach the city limit, where I-84 and NY 52 cross the highway heading towards the Newburgh–Beacon Bridge. Immediately beyond that junction, NY 32 separates from US 9W and heads northwest.

=== Newburgh to New Paltz ===
Newburgh has a commercial strip north of the city, featuring the Mid-Valley Mall and another large shopping plaza built around a supermarket anchor. This development ends after 1 mile (1.6 km) when 32 passes the Town of Newburgh's Cronomer Hill Park on the south, near a short drive to the summit observation tower. 2 miles (3 km) more brings NY 32 to the center of the hamlet of Cronomer Valley and an unusual junction with NY 300. At what seems to be a conventional four-way intersection regulated by a traffic light, both highways turn, and it is necessary to turn to the northeast to stay on NY 32 headed north. Traffic that goes straight at this intersection flows onto NY 300.

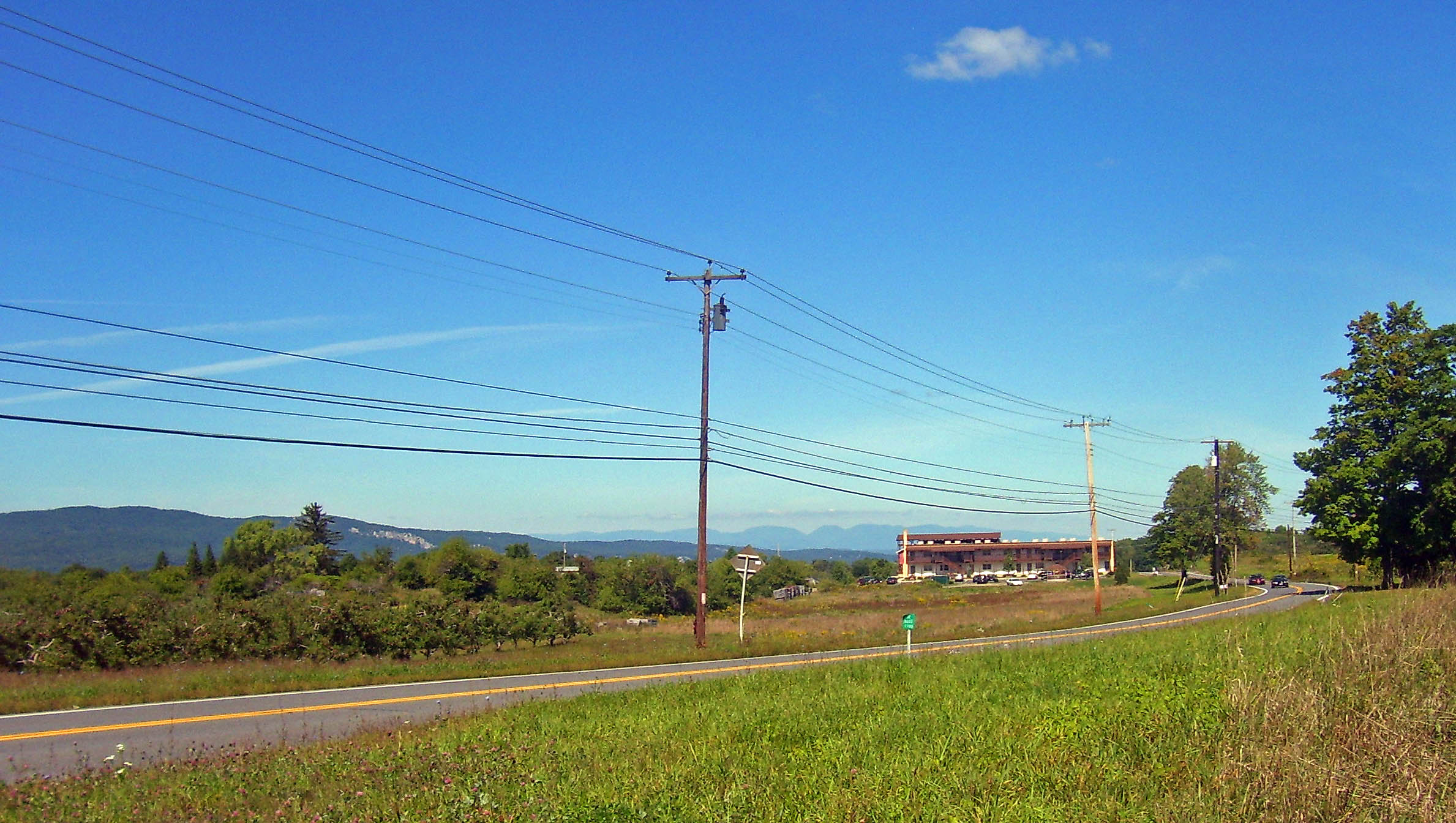
Views of the Shawangunks and Catskills as the highway nears New Paltz

From this intersection, NY 32 passes Chadwick Lake, the town's reservoir, and continues straight north through much less-developed, mostly wooded countryside for 4 miles (6 km) to the Ulster County line, almost the point at which the woods diminish. Barely 1 mile (1.6 km) into Plattekill, the highway crosses the Thruway again. It curves northwards shortly thereafter, retaining a slightly westward trend through mostly open fields near the Shawangunk Ridge. At 4.5 miles (7.2 km) from the Thruway, NY 32 intersects US 44 and NY 55 in the center of another Town of Plattekill hamlet, Modena. A short distance beyond, the highway crosses into Gardiner, taking a wide bend around Locust Lawn, the Federal-style home of early 19th-century politician Josiah Hasbrouck.

North of Modena, the surrounding area becomes slightly more wooded near where NY 32 crosses into the Town of New Paltz. The highway curves before entering the village next to the campus of State University of New York at New Paltz. Two blocks north of campus, at New Paltz Middle School, it turns west at a traffic signal to join NY 299 as the village's Main Street.

=== New Paltz to Kingston ===
While NY 32 officially remains concurrent with NY 299 all the way to the traffic light at the northern terminus of NY 208, a sign at the Elting Memorial Library, just before the center of downtown, directs northbound traffic on the highway down North Front Street. This shortcut allows that traffic to skip an often busy intersection and head out of the village on North Chestnut Street. Once past the village, the Ulster Board of Cooperative Educational Services (BOCES) building comes up on the west and the town hall along the east. NY 32 then becomes mostly rural again.

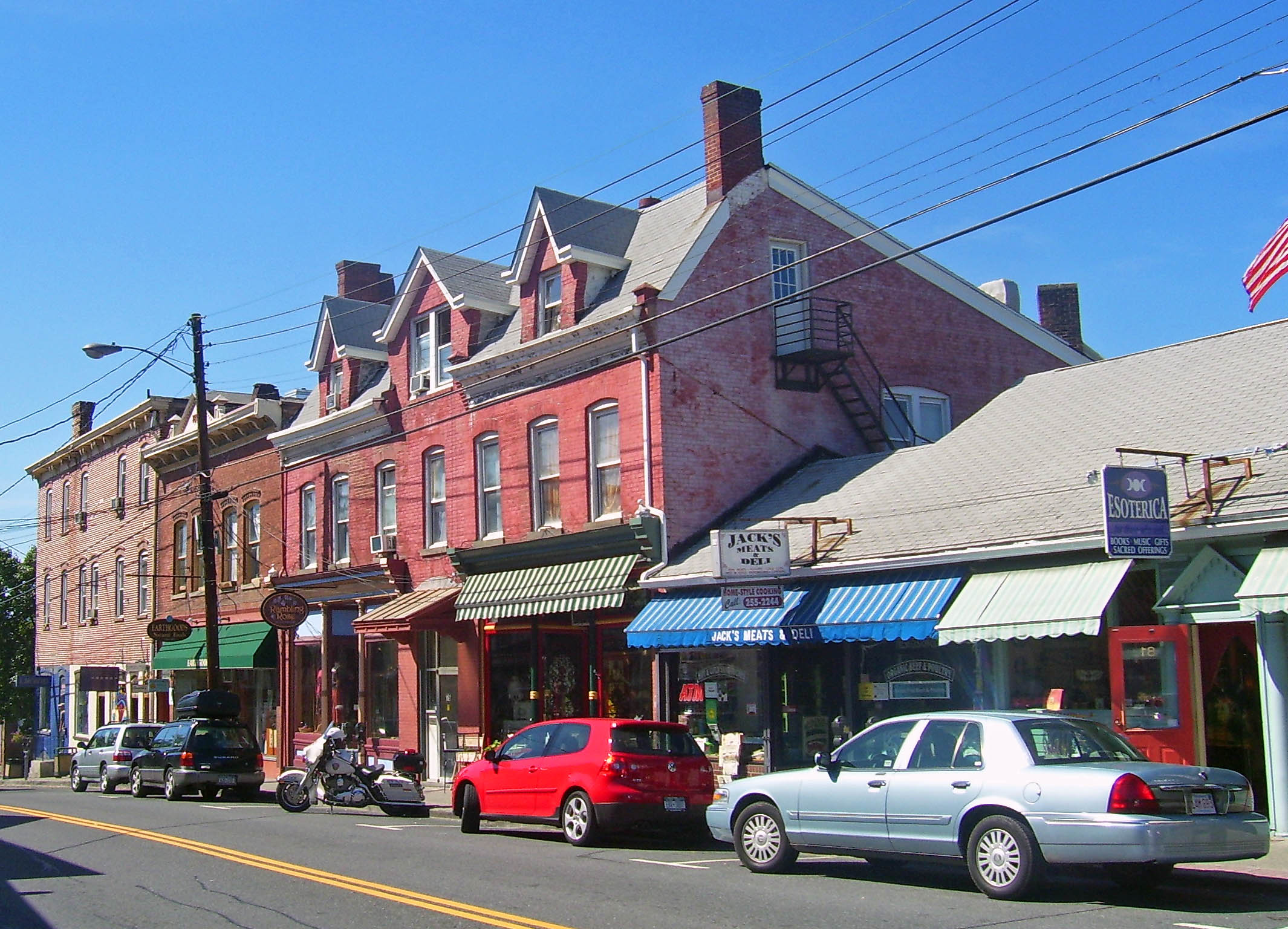
Downtown New Paltz

Over the next 5 miles (8 km), the road trends easterly until NY 213 joins it from the east right before the bridge over the Wallkill. Now concurrent, 32 and 213 bend away from the Thruway and pass through the hamlet of Tillson and then descend to cross Rondout Creek at the former village of Rosendale. Just after the crossing, at the Stewart's, NY 213 leaves to the west along the creek, ending a 2.5-mile (4.0 km) concurrency.

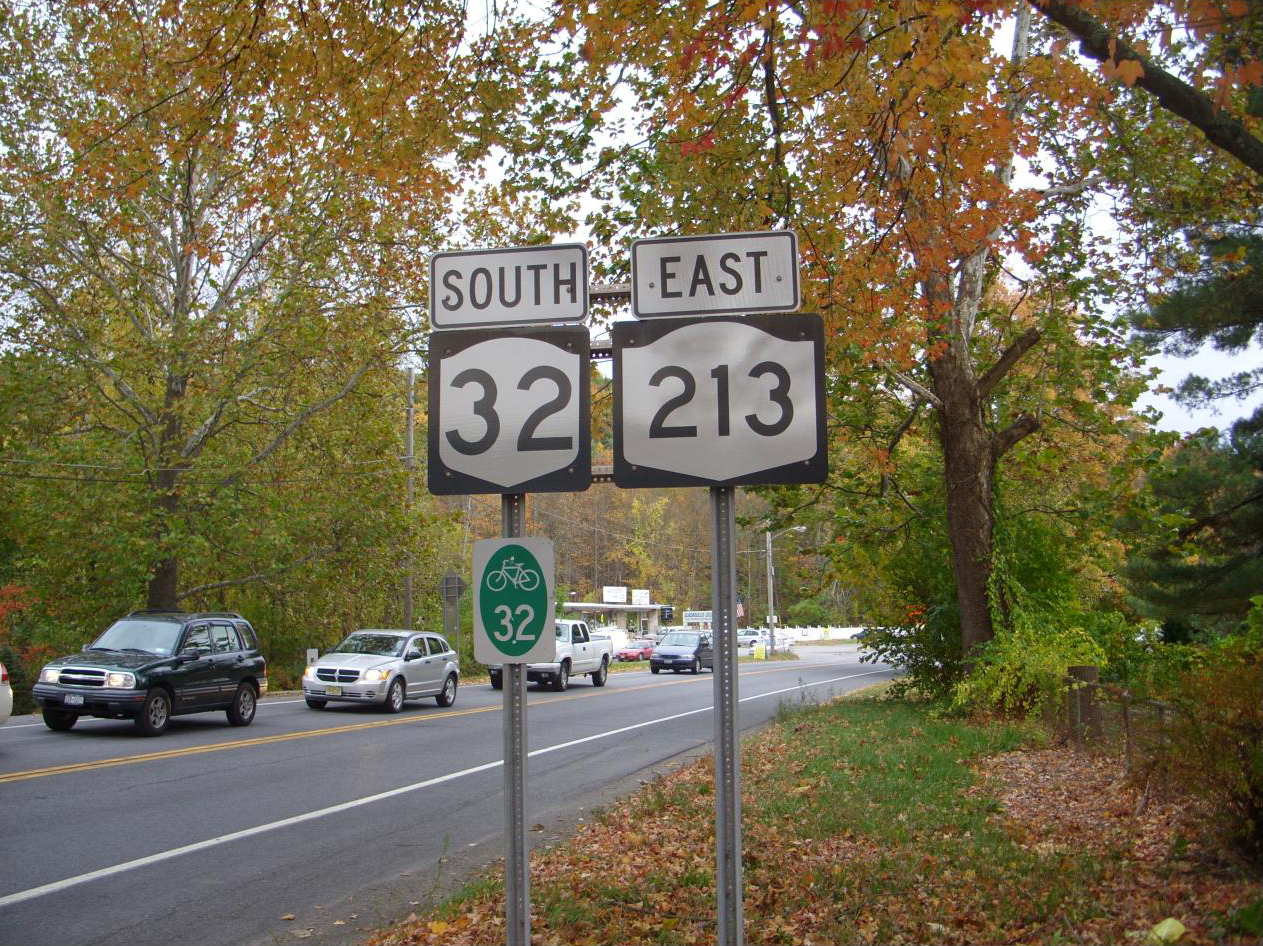
NY 213 and NY 32 concurrency in Rosendale

From Rosendale, NY 32 climbs up out of the Rondout valley and veers east into the hamlet of Maple Hill, where it crosses over the Thruway once again. It resumes a northerly course through Bloomington, and several miles further on crosses the Kingston city line. This entire segment of NY 32 is also concurrent with New York State Bicycle Route 32.

=== Kingston and Saugerties ===
On its route through Kingston, NY 32 frequently changes streets and directions. It enters town as Boulevard and meanders to just past Washington Avenue, where it splits onto the more easterly Greenkill Avenue and Fair Street for several blocks. NY 213 returns, merging from the south as Wilbur Avenue. The joined routes then turn onto Clinton Avenue for two blocks, then east onto Henry Street for about 0.5 miles (0.8 km) to Broadway, where NY 32 turns north and NY 213 ends.

Another 0.5 miles (0.8 km) brings Broadway to the wide junction where I-587 and NY 28 both terminate. NY 32 follows Albany Avenue northeast to Flatbush Avenue, where it turns to assume an eastward course. This finally bends slightly north to East Chester Street near the city limit, where US 9W again comes in to begin a brief wrong-way concurrency in which NY 32 north is US 9W south. It ends, unsigned, after 1,500 feet (460 m) with US 9W's turn onto Frank Koenig Boulevard.

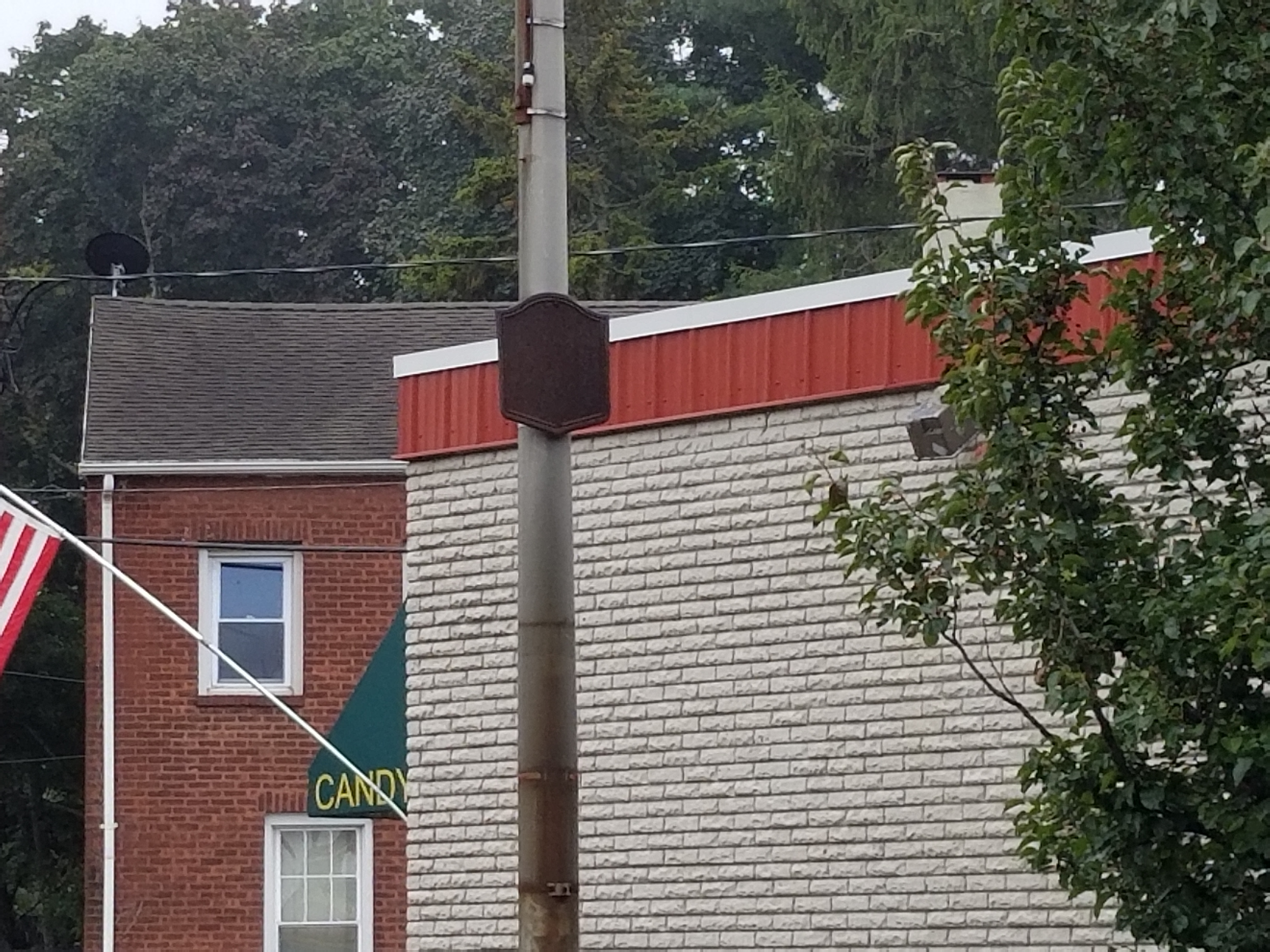
Rusted 1930s state route shield just east of the I-587 and NY 28 intersection

Continuing as Flatbush Road into the Town of Ulster, NY 32 is for the first time along its route east of US 9W and closer to the river. It encounters NY 199 at an interchange immediately west of the Kingston–Rhinecliff Bridge. Soon after, it passes Kingston–Ulster Airport. It remains on a northerly heading until 1 mile (1.6 km) south of Saugerties, where it veers west and merges with US 9W again. The two routes cross Esopus Creek and enter the village, where Partition Street gives way to Main Street. At that T intersection, US 9W turns to continue north, while NY 32 picks up the new NY 212 and heads west out of town.

=== The Catskills to Albany ===
After one block of Main Street, NY 32 and NY 212 turn onto Market Street, then east onto Ulster Avenue after another block. As it crosses the railroad tracks and leaves the village, the road widens and becomes a commercial highway just before reaching a Thruway exit. This, the fourth time NY 32 has crossed the Thruway, is the first time it does so at an exit. Beyond the overpass, the concurrency ends when NY 32 turns and heads north once again. A tight nearby on-ramp provides access to the southbound Thruway. NY 32 does not enter the Catskills but provides access to them along this stretch.

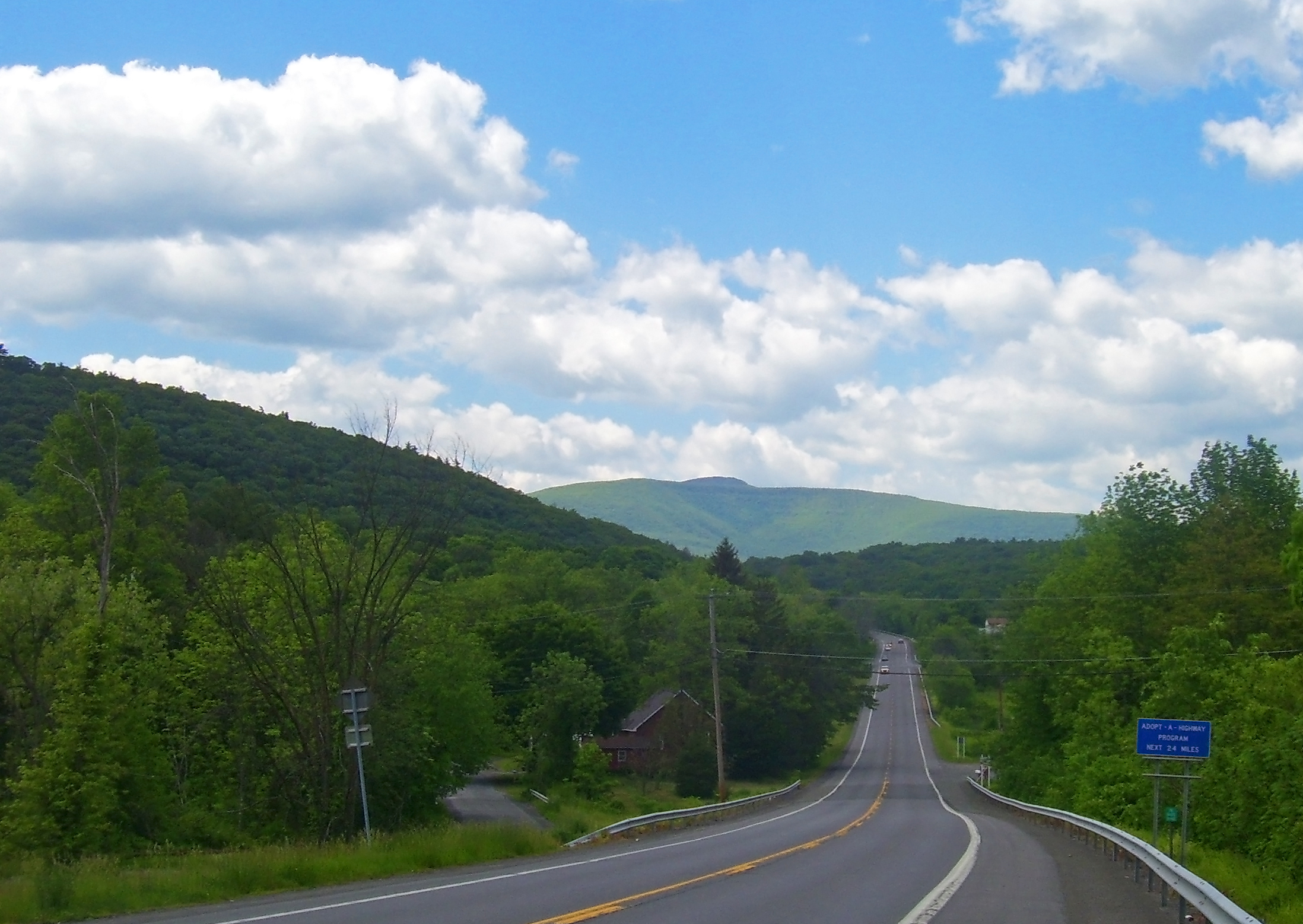
Kaaterskill High Peak in the distance as NY 32 nears the Catskills

At this point, the distance between NY 32 and the Thruway begins to widen. At the junction with Malden Turnpike (CR 34), NY 32 turns westward, toward the Catskill Escarpment, and starts climbing through some rock cuts. When Blue Mountain Road (CR 35) comes in from the south, NY 32 resumes heading north, parallel to the ridge. 1 mile (1.6 km) from that junction, its only suffixed route, NY 32A, splits off to the west to provide direct access via NY 23A and Kaaterskill Clove to Tannersville and Hunter.

After crossing into Greene County, the road intersects NY 23A at an undeveloped junction. NY 32 remains in its straight course through the lowlands below the escarpment, passing through mostly woodlands and the hamlet of Kiskatom, then winding around the north side of Cairo Roundtop before it joins with NY 23 at Cairo. After 1.5 miles (2.4 km), NY 32 leaves the divided highway to once again strike north as a two-lane route. It trends west to its westernmost point until turning to the north-northeast just south of Freehold.

North of Freehold the road begins to climb. Views south to the Catskills appear as it nears the center of Greenville, where it crosses NY 81. 1 mile (1.6 km) further on, NY 32 enters Albany County via Westerlo near the Basic Creek Reservoir. The climbing stops another mile after the county line, where NY 32 reaches its highest elevation, 1,060 feet (320 m), on the plateaus south of the Helderberg Escarpment. The road starts to curve back east as the surrounding landscape opens up, with larger fields surrounding it and a slow descent to the Hudson beginning.

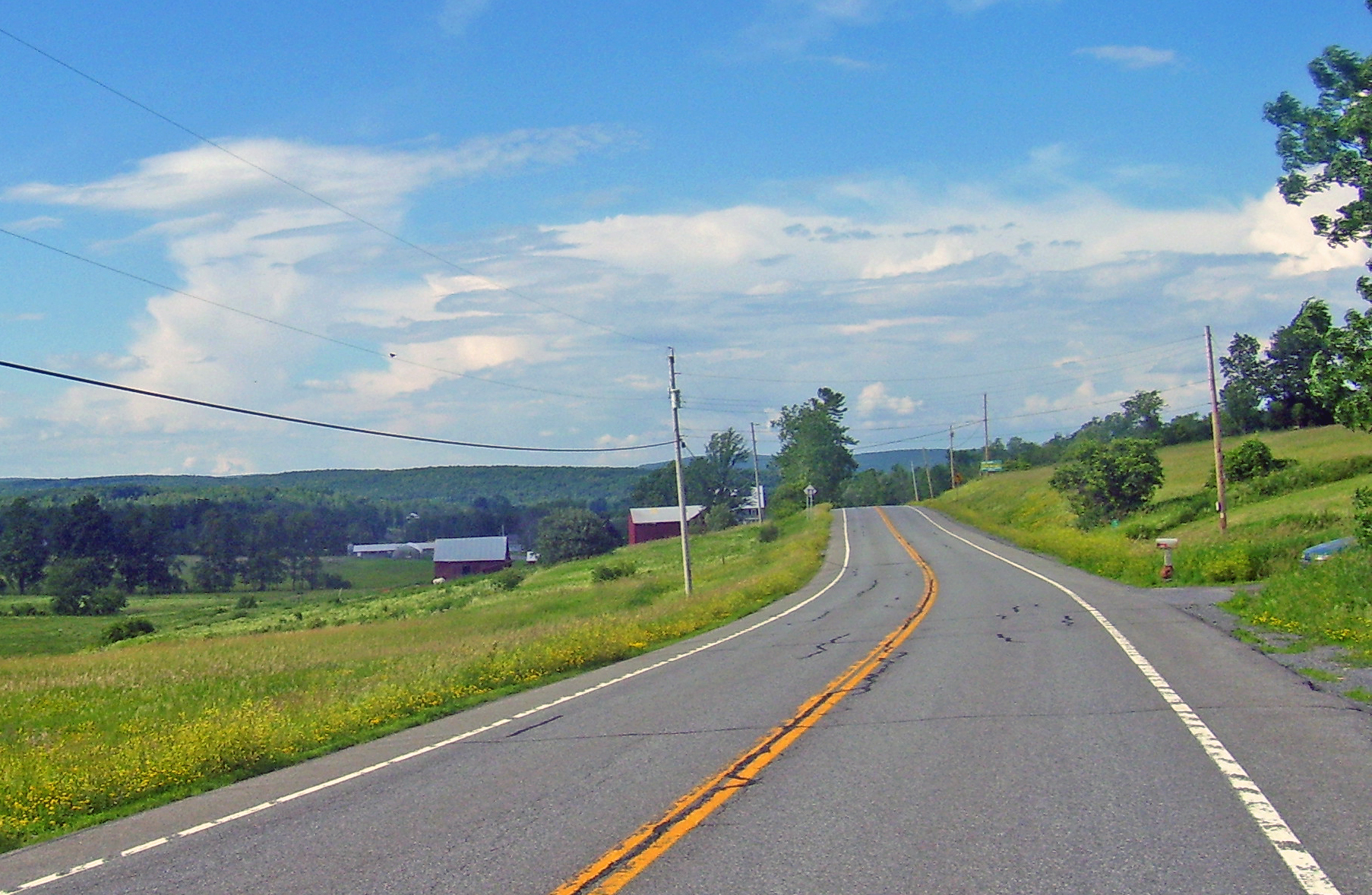
Rural landscape along NY 32 in Westerlo

After sharing 2 miles (3.2 km) of road with NY 143, crossing the northern end of Alcove Reservoir and descending the southern end of the Helderberg Escarpment, the road veers eastward toward Albany. To get there, it crosses into New Scotland, passing through the hamlet of Feura Bush, and crosses a long bridge over the northern end of the busy rail yard northwest of Selkirk, where freight trains bound for New York City wait before crossing the Hudson at the Alfred H. Smith Memorial Bridge.

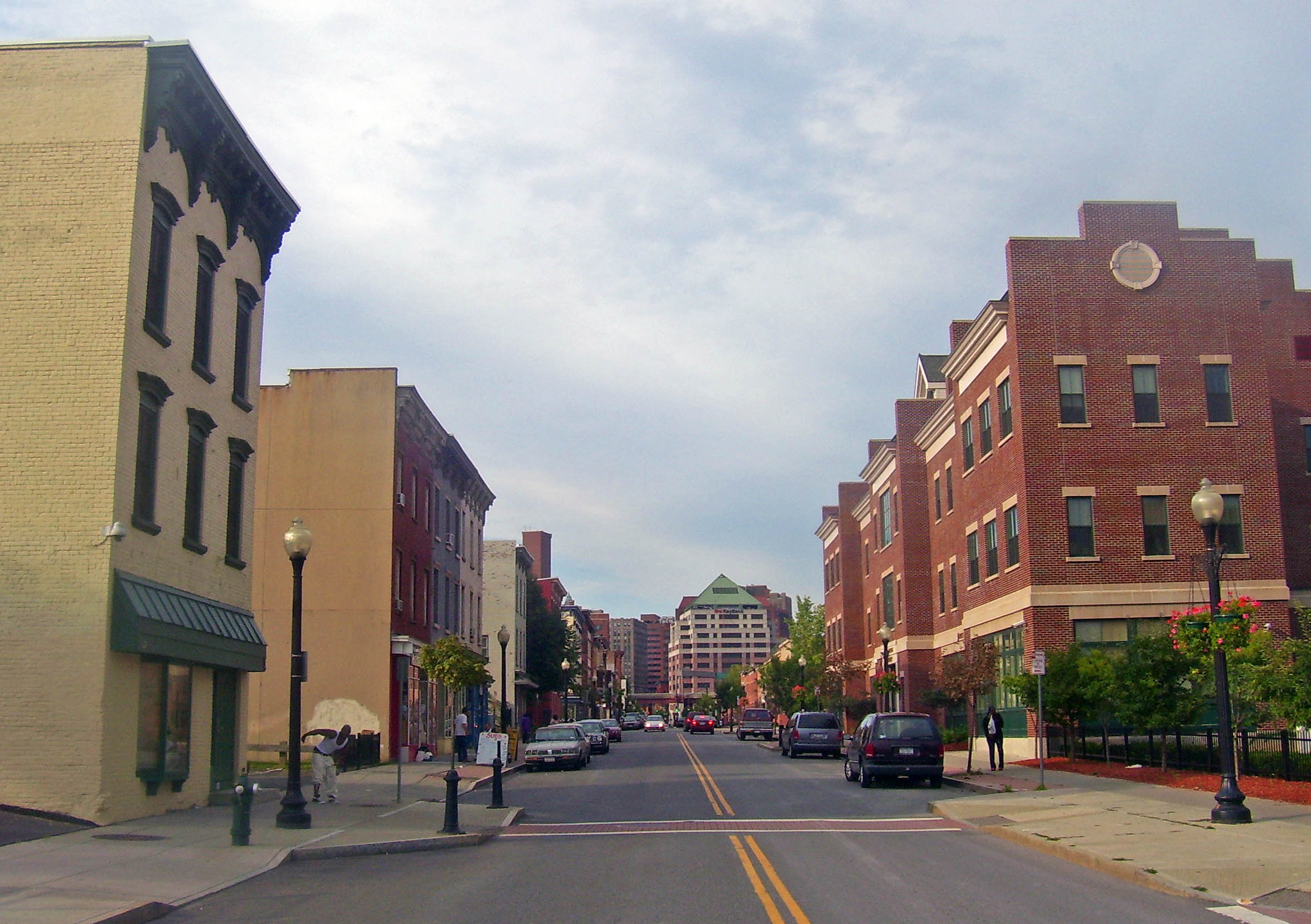
Approaching downtown Albany

The landscape becomes more developed, though still rural, as the highway winds past a SABIC plant and other development accompanying the rail yard, entering the town of Bethlehem. At the southern corner of Delmar, NY 32 turns more to the east becomes a divided highway with grade intersections, the only non-concurrent segment of NY 32 to take this form. This segment continues, largely undeveloped, as it intersects NY 335 and crosses under the Thruway for the last time before reaching its final concurrency with US 9W. 0.5 miles (0.8 km) east of the Thruway, NY 32 again breaks from 9W and follows residential Corning Hill Road downhill to River Road, where it turns to the north again and crosses the Normans Kill into Albany, becoming South Pearl Street, and then paralleling I-787 for a short distance past the Port of Albany–Rensselaer before crossing underneath it.

=== Albany to Hudson Falls ===
NY 32 follows South Pearl Street between the Mansion and Pastures neighborhoods, intersecting US 20 (Madison Avenue) near the approach to the Dunn Memorial Bridge, and then becoming one of the two main streets of downtown Albany. At Clinton Square and the Palace Theatre it intersects US 9 along Clinton Avenue. Near the city limits, NY 32 passes under I-90. Upon crossing into the neighboring village of Menands, NY 32 bears onto Wolfert Avenue to access Broadway. Broadway, a business thoroughfare originating in downtown Albany, is designated NY 910C, an unsigned reference route, for 0.06 miles (0.10 km) south of Wolfert Avenue to the Albany city line. NY 32 occupies Broadway north of Wolfert Avenue, right at the former headquarters of Albany International, paralleling I-787. I-787's exit 6 ramps meet NY 32 in Menands, then NY 32 crosses over railroad tracks and soon leaves the village. NY 32 enters the hamlet of Schuyler Heights in the town of Colonie. After a short stretch the road enters the city of Watervliet where the name changes from Broadway to Third Avenue. The Watervliet Arsenal forces NY 32 to curve northeasterly as Ninth Street. Then at a traffic signal NY 32 turns left onto Broadway.

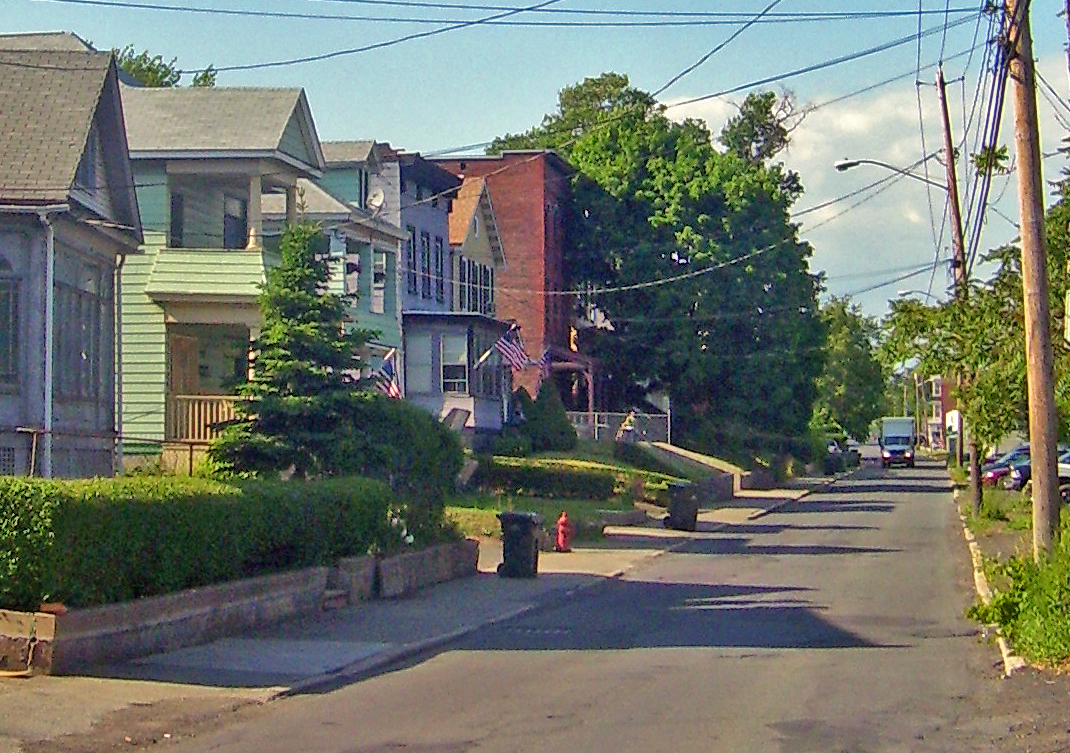
Residential neighborhood along NY 32 in Cohoes

At 13th Street, NY 32 leaves Broadway and follows 13th two blocks west to an intersection with 2nd Avenue. Here, NY 155 begins and occupies 13th Street to the west of 2nd Avenue while NY 32 turns north onto 2nd. NY 32 continues in the vicinity of I-787 and its continuation, NY 787, through Watervliet and back into the town of Colonie, this time it is through the hamlet of Maplewood, to Cohoes, where NY 787 ends at NY 32 near the convergence of the Mohawk and Hudson rivers at New Courtland Street. Past NY 787, NY 32 crosses the Mohawk River into Saratoga County and the town of Waterford, after crossing into the village of Waterford NY 32 crosses the Erie Canal before intersecting US 4 in the heart of the village. The two routes merge, forming an overlap northward along the Hudson River.

In Mechanicville, US 4 and NY 32 briefly overlap NY 67. Farther north, the two routes split north of Stillwater at the southern edge of the Saratoga National Historical Park. While US 4 straddles the park to the east, NY 32 follows the southern and western extents of the park before rejoining US 4 south of Schuylerville. In Schuylerville, the two routes are concurrent with NY 29 for a short distance before exiting the village. To the north of the village in Northumberland, NY 32 separates from US 4 and heads northwest to Gansevoort, where it meets NY 50. NY 32 continues north on the right-of-way of NY 50 to South Glens Falls, where US 9 joins NY 32 northward across the Hudson River into Glens Falls.

Shortly after entering the city, NY 32 turns onto Warren Street, splitting from US 9 and following the Hudson River east toward Hudson Falls. At Highland Avenue, NY 32 turns east, following Highland past Quaker Road (NY 254) to Dix Avenue, where it merges east onto Dix. NY 32 remains on Dix into Hudson Falls, intersecting US 4 one last time north of the village before continuing through the intersection onto Burgoyne Avenue. The route follows Burgoyne Avenue southward around the northeastern portion of Hudson Falls to NY 196, where NY 32 terminates. Burgoyne Avenue continues southwestward as CR 37 to US 4 in Fort Edward.

== History ==
=== Old roads ===
South of Mountainville, NY 32 was part of the New Windsor and Cornwall Turnpike, which stretched from the Orange Turnpike at Southfields to New Windsor. The turnpike became NY 17 south of Harriman. North of Newburgh, the road follows the Newburgh and Sullivan Turnpike to the NY 300 junction and the old Plattekill Turnpike from NY 300 to Ulster County. South of Newburgh, the road became part of the West Shore Route auto trail; from Albany to Watervliet, the road was the northern extension of the New York-Albany-Troy Post Route trail.

=== Designation ===
The segment of modern NY 32 between Albany and Mechanicville was designated as part of NY 6 in 1924. From Mechanicville to Hudson Falls, the current routing of NY 32 became part of NY 30. By 1926, the portion of what is now NY 32 from Harriman to Newburgh was designated NY 58. From Newburgh to Albany, NY 32 remained unnumbered at the time. When U.S. Routes were first assigned in New York in 1927, the portion of NY 6 from Albany to Waterford was designated as the northernmost portion of US 9W. In Waterford, US 9W merged with US 9E and continued north as US 9 to Mechanicville, where US 9 turned west onto modern NY 67.

In the 1930 renumbering of state highways in New York, US 9W was truncated to Albany while US 9 was rerouted to follow a new stretch between Albany and Round Lake. The former routing of both routes along the Hudson River between Albany and Mechanicville, as well as the entirety of NY 58 and the portion of NY 30 from Schuylerville to Glens Falls was integrated into the new NY 32, which followed its current routing between Harriman and the Stillwater community of Bemis Heights and from Schuylerville to Glens Falls. Between Bemis Heights and Schuylerville, NY 32 followed what is now US 4 along the Hudson River while the former routing of NY 30 between the two locations became NY 32A. At the same time, US 4, which previously ended in Glens Falls, was rerouted south of Hudson Falls to end in East Greenbush. From Northumberland to Waterford, the route used what is now NY 32.

=== Reroutings ===
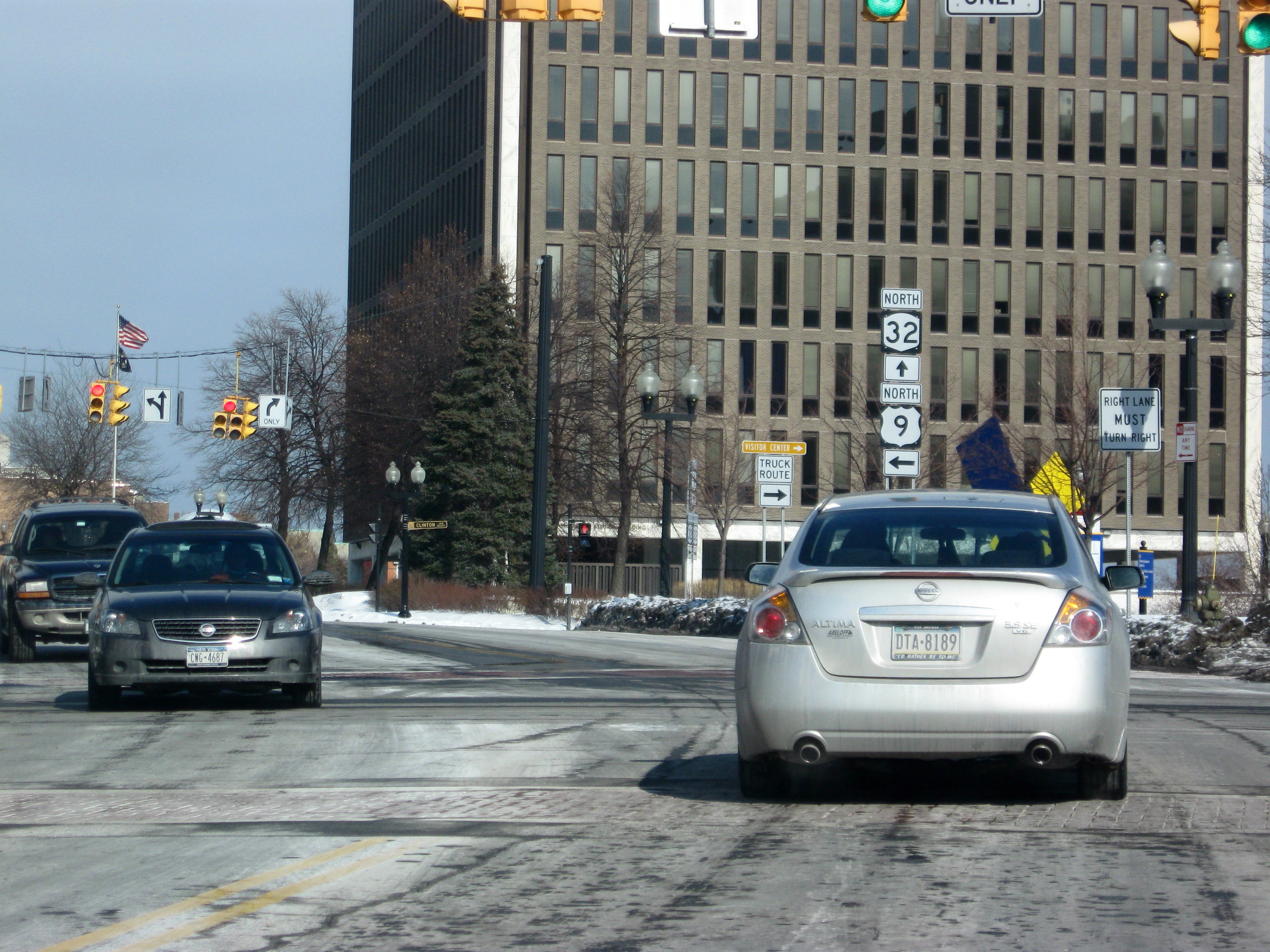
NY 32 at its intersection with US 9 in Albany.

NY 32 has been realigned in several locations since its inception in 1930. When the route was initially assigned, it passed through Palenville instead of bypassing it to the east as it does today. In the early 1940s, NY 32 was rerouted to follow a new highway east of the hamlet. NY 32's former routing into Palenville was redesignated as NY 32A. The original NY 32A in Saratoga County—which was redundant to US 4—was supplanted at this time by a rerouted NY 32. The Bemis Heights–Schuylerville portion of the overlap between US 4 and NY 32 was eliminated in the 1950s when the original routing of NY 32 between the two locations was upgraded. Construction on the highway began in the mid-1950s and was completed by 1958, at which time US 4 was rerouted to follow the riverside roadway.

In Bethlehem, a southern suburb of Albany, NY 32 was originally routed on Feura Bush Road between the hamlets of Feura Bush and Glenmont. North of Glenmont, NY 32 followed what is now NY 144. In 1956, the Albany County Board of Supervisors asked the state of New York to develop a highway that would reduce the amount of traffic on NY 43 (now NY 443) in Bethlehem. The original plans released by the state in 1959 called for a four-lane divided highway between NY 85 in New Scotland and US 9W in Bethlehem. The new road, known as the Delmar Bypass, would run south of the hamlets of Slingerlands, Delmar, and Elsmere, and loosely parallel Feura Bush Road to the north between Elm Avenue and US 9W.

By February 1961, however, the state favored a new alignment that brought the bypass north from Elm Avenue to Slingerlands, where it would connect to the proposed Slingerlands Bypass north of NY 85. As a result, the road would run through the western part of Delmar and the eastern section of Slingerlands. The change in plans was met with stiff opposition from area residents at a February 8 public hearing, and the Bethlehem Town Board unanimously voted to oppose the altered route at a meeting one week later. Both actions eventually led the state to cancel the portion of the route west of Elm Avenue in January 1963. The 3.37-mile (5.42 km) portion east of Elm Avenue was completed in December 1963 and became part of a realigned NY 32 in the 1970s. Part of the right-of-way for the Delmar Bypass near Slingerlands was eventually used for a realignment of NY 140 named Cherry Avenue Extension. NY 32's former routing along Feura Bush Road is still state-maintained as NY 910A, an unsigned reference route.

NY 32 ended in downtown Glens Falls until January 1, 1949, when the highway was extended east to US 4 in Hudson Falls by way of Warren Street, Boulevard, and Feeder Street. On April 1, 1980, ownership and maintenance of Boulevard between Highland Avenue and the Washington County line was transferred from the state of New York to Warren County in exchange for control over Highland and Dix avenues between Warren Avenue and the Washington County line. In Hudson Falls, Boulevard and the segment of Feeder Street south of Boulevard were given to Washington County on April 1 of the following year in return for ownership and maintenance over all of Dix and Burgoyne avenues north of NY 196. NY 32 was rerouted to follow Highland, Dix, and Burgoyne avenues shortly afterward.

=== Rondout Creek bridge rehabilitation ===
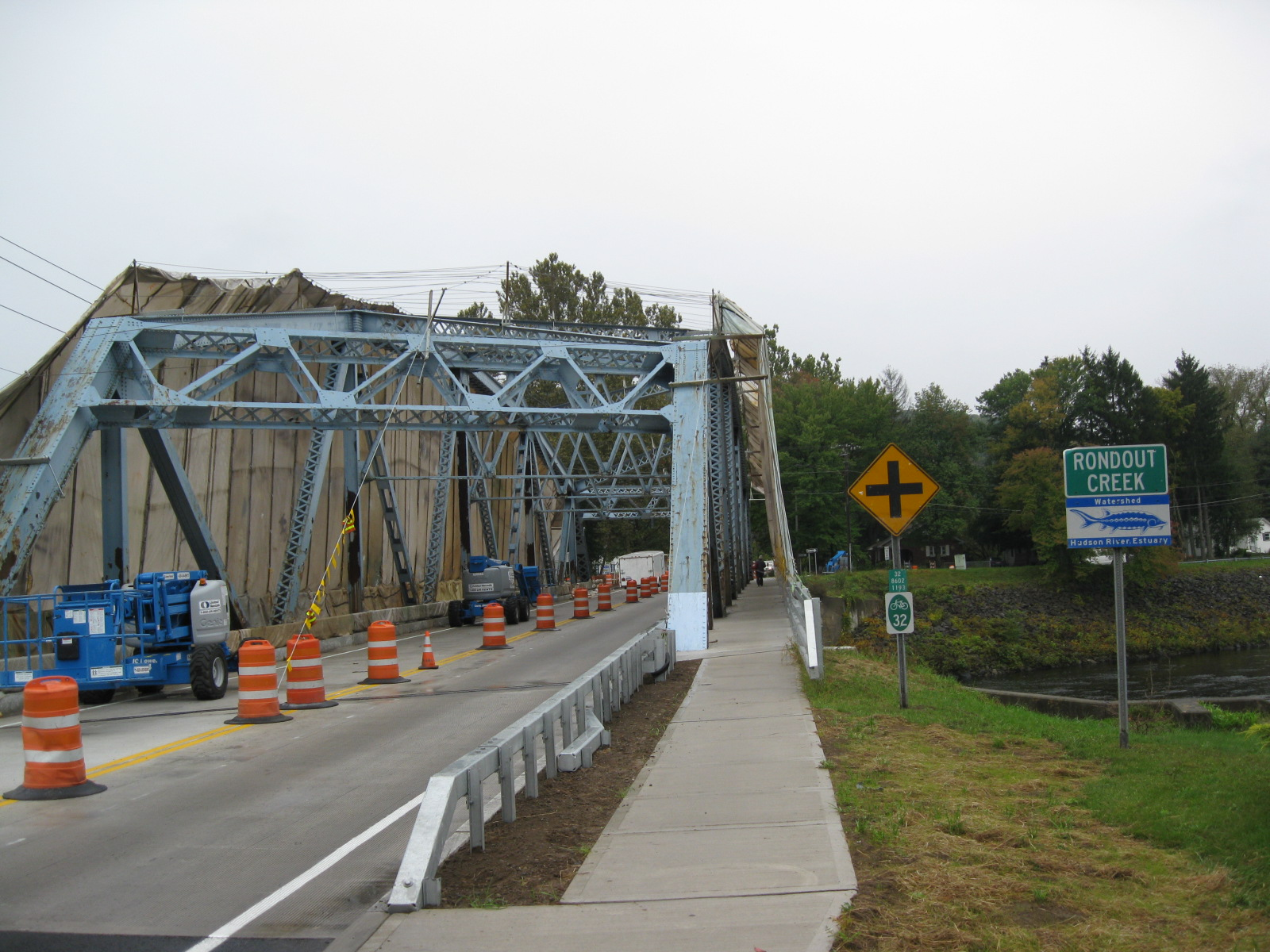
The bridge in Rosendale Village being renovated in 2009

In June 2008, NYSDOT began a rehabilitation project of the bridge over Rondout Creek in Rosendale. The 1/2-mile (0.8 km) project involved rehabilitating the bridge one half at a time. The project was slated to have the 74-year-old bridge up to standards by the fall of 2009. It also included improvements to the road leading up to the bridge. Having only one lane open at a time congested traffic in the area. The total cost of the project was $5.5 million. The bridge had been refurbished before, in 1970.

== Future ==
In several locations, traffic congestion along NY 32 has led to suggestions to change or modify the road. The problems are most severe at the southern terminus, but it is not the only section of the road with issues.

=== Woodbury Commons ===
The road's southern terminus at Woodbury Commons is the most frequent topic of discussion, especially since Black Friday in 2001, when heavy traffic from holiday shoppers along adjacent sections of not only 32 but routes 6 and 17 and the Thruway came to a complete standstill. "This should have been planned for and it wasn't", complained one local official. "Now you're trying to close the door and the horse is already out". Despite several efforts and the presence of state police on later Black Fridays, a similar traffic jam occurred on Labor Day weekend 2006, when a break in bad weather led to an increase in shoppers so marked that US 6 and the Thruway were backed up as far as the Palisades Interstate Parkway and Newburgh, respectively. The Woodbury police chief cited the blockage created by drivers making the left turn from NY 32 to the Thruway as the cause. Plans to build an exit ramp that would allow that traffic to go directly to the tollbooth have been expedited.

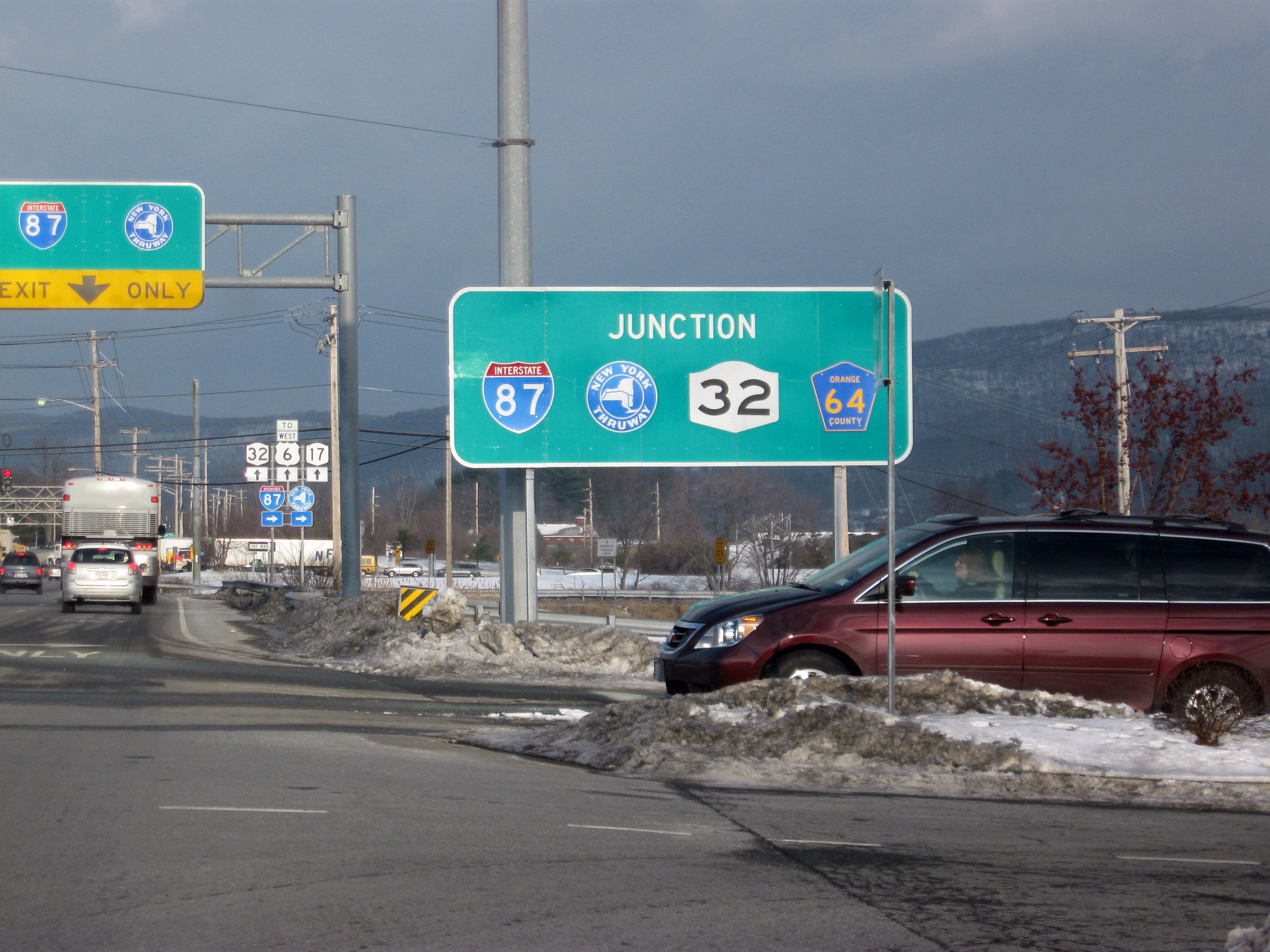
NY 32 begins just ahead adjacent to the Woodbury Commons.

On the weekend of August 17–18, 2009, another serious traffic jam occurred, in which it took some drivers two hours to get to the Thruway from the mall. Officials cited several factors: the heavy traffic on NY 17 that weekend for both the 40th anniversary of the Woodstock Music Festival in Sullivan County and the observances of the anniversary of Rabbi Joel Teitelbaum's death in Kiryas Joel, a few miles to the west. A traffic light that had been malfunctioning after a recent lightning strike may also have contributed.

In 2007, New York State Department of Transportation (NYSDOT) officials announced their long-term plan to prevent further traffic jams. They will create a series of loops and overpasses allowing traffic to go directly from southbound NY 32 to the Thruway and remove some traffic lights in front of the mall. The changes were expected to be complete by 2011, as part of improvements to convert the NY 17 expressway into I-86. However, in 2009 they were postponed due to funding constraints. Work was slated to begin in 2013, but just before it could start Governor Andrew Cuomo redirected the money to repair projects elsewhere in the state. The project was put on indefinite hold in 2014 until it could be funded.

In 2016, NYSDOT announced a new five-year capital spending plan that included the exit 131 project. Construction is not expected to begin until 2018 at the earliest. Before beginning, the agency says it must acquire 7.4 acres (3.0 ha), permanent easements over another 1.1 acres (0.45 ha) and temporary easements over 28 acres (11 ha). The revised plan, DOT says, will allow it to shorten the timetable and complete the project in one phase instead of the two originally planned. It was expected to cost $115 million.

Late in 2017, Cuomo revealed details of NYSDOT's new plan at a news conference. The main element would include converting the interchange into a diverging diamond, where traffic would switch sides of the road on the overpass so both left and right turns onto NY 17 would not have to be made against opposing traffic; in order to meet 16.5-foot (5.0 m) federal clearance requirements for Interstate Highway standards, NY 17, gradually being converted into I-86, will be lowered by 4 feet (1.2 m) beneath the new overpass. Nininger Road (CR 64), which currently ends at NY 32 just north of the interchange, would also be extended to the east and grade separated as well, passing underneath NY 32 in a new overpass to connect to a roundabout where it would meet a new access road to the mall and an offramp from northbound NY 32. Cuomo said the new plan would cost $150 million and be completed by November 2019.

=== Vails Gate ===
The "Five Corners" intersection of NY 32 and NY 94 at Vails Gate was a four-way junction until World War II, when the Army extended Temple Hill Road, later NY 300, southeast to the junction so that troops and materiel could get between West Point and the airbase at what was then Stewart Field more quickly. It did not become a traffic problem until the 1990s, when gas stations, supermarkets, strip malls and fast-food restaurants had been built on every corner.

By the end of the 20th century, the intersection was handling 30,000 drivers a day, from increasingly developed Cornwall, Newburgh and New Windsor. NYSDOT expanded the intersection with middle-turn lanes and overhead signs on all approaches. Many drivers still felt it was a confusing intersection and that the confusion slowed traffic down as much as the many cars' stopping to enter and exit nearby businesses. In 2001 state officials said they had done everything possible to improve traffic flows through the Five Corners. Continuing congestion was attributable to insufficient or nonexistent planning.

=== Downtown New Paltz ===
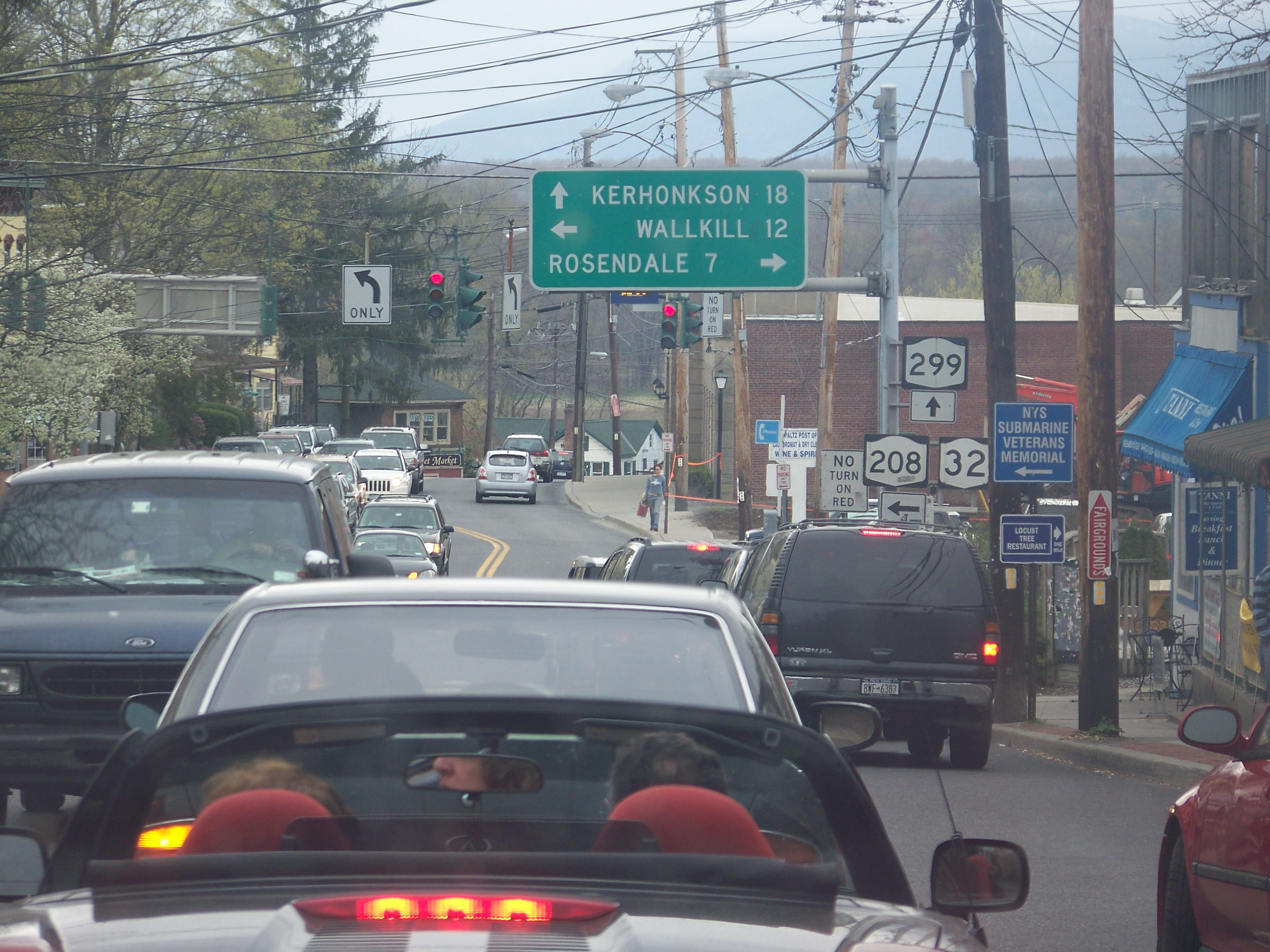
Congestion in downtown New Paltz

Another choke point has been Main Street in New Paltz, a section shared by NY 32 and NY 299. This is the main route back to the Thruway and downstate from the heavily used hiking and climbing areas at Mohonk Preserve and Minnewaska State Park Preserve in the Shawangunks. It is also a well-developed commercial area in a college town, with ample street parking.

Traffic through the village has been so heavy on weekends during summer and peak leaf peeping weekends in early autumn that many residents have proposed making Main Street one-way, carrying traffic only to the west, while diverting eastbound traffic onto either of two parallel streets. Other villages that have made such changes found making streets one-way decreased business at their retailers.

After four years of studying and reviewing the issue, the town and the village agreed to make the change. In 2007, however, the village's new mayor, who had supported the plan while a trustee, changed his mind and said the village's support was "on hold". While campaigning, he said, few village residents had expressed support for the plan. What he learned since taking over as mayor had only further convinced him that it was mostly town residents who wanted the street changes. He also believed that making Main Street one-way would reduce the total amount of routes available to vehicles passing through the village and would adversely route traffic away from the businesses along Main.

== Major intersections ==
| County | Location | mi | km | Destinations | Notes |
|---|---|---|---|---|---|
| Orange | Woodbury | 0.00 | 0.00 | Future I-86 / US 6 / NY 17 to I-87 Toll / New York Thruway – New York City, Monroe | Southern terminus; exit 131 on NY 17 |
| Orange | Town of Cornwall | 9.72 | 15.64 | CR 107 east (Quaker Avenue) – Cornwall, Bear Mountain Bridge | Former NY 307; hamlet of Orrs Mill |
| Orange | Town of New Windsor | 11.48 | 18.48 | NY 94 / NY 300 north – Washingtonville, New Windsor | Southern terminus of NY 300; hamlet of Vails Gate |
| Orange | City of Newburgh | 15.08 | 24.27 | NY 17K west (Broadway) to I-87 Toll / New York Thruway / I-84 | Southern end of NY 17K concurrency |
| Orange | City of Newburgh | 15.31 | 24.64 | US 9W south NY 17K ends | Southern end of US 9W concurrency; eastern terminus of NY 17K |
| Orange | City of Newburgh | | | South Street (NY 980P) | Former NY 52 |
| Orange | Town of Newburgh | 16.61– 16.89 | 26.73– 27.18 | I-84 / NY 52 (Newburgh–Beacon Bridge) / US 9W north – Port Jervis, Middletown, Kingston, Stewart Airport | Northern end of US 9W concurrency; exit 39 on I-84; hamlet of Balmville |
| Orange | Town of Newburgh | 19.87 | 31.98 | NY 300 to I-87 Toll / New York Thruway / I-84 – Wallkill | Hamlet of Cronomer Valley |
| Ulster | Plattekill | 29.07 | 46.78 | US 44 / NY 55 – Gardiner, Clintondale | Hamlet of Modena |
| Ulster | Village of New Paltz | 34.95 | 56.25 | NY 299 east to I-87 Toll / New York Thruway – Highland | Southern end of NY 299 concurrency |
| Ulster | Village of New Paltz | 35.46 | 57.07 | NY 208 south / NY 299 west – Wallkill, Kerhonkson | Northern end of NY 299 concurrency; northern terminus of NY 208 |
| Ulster | Town of Esopus | 40.28 | 64.82 | NY 213 east – Rifton | Southern end of NY 213 concurrency |
| Ulster | Town of Rosendale | 42.83 | 68.93 | NY 213 west / CR 25 east – High Falls | Northern end of NY 213 concurrency; hamlet of Rosendale |
| Ulster | City of Kingston | 49.69 | 79.97 | NY 213 west (Clinton Avenue) | Southern end of NY 213 concurrency |
| Ulster | City of Kingston | 50.01 | 80.48 | NY 213 south | Northern terminus of NY 213 |
| Ulster | City of Kingston | 50.34 | 81.01 | I-587 west / NY 28 north to I-87 Toll / New York Thruway | Eastern terminus of I-587; southern terminus of NY 28 |
| Ulster | City of Kingston | 51.87 | 83.48 | US 9W north | Southern end of US 9W concurrency |
| Ulster | Ulster | 52.15 | 83.93 | US 9W south | Northern end of US 9W concurrency |
| Ulster | Ulster | 54.54 | 87.77 | NY 199 to I-87 Toll / New York Thruway / US 209 south – Ellenville, Rhinecliff Bridge | Interchange |
| Ulster | Town of Saugerties | 60.14 | 96.79 | US 9W south | Southern end of US 9W concurrency; hamlet of Glasco |
| Ulster | Village of Saugerties | 62.36 | 100.36 | US 9W north (Main Street) NY 212 begins | Northern end of US 9W concurrency; eastern terminus of NY 212 |
| Ulster | Town of Saugerties | 63.61 | 102.37 | CR 31 south (Kings Highway) – Mount Marion | Northern terminus of CR 31 |
| Ulster | Town of Saugerties | 63.62– 63.70 | 102.39– 102.52 | I-87 Toll / New York Thruway / NY 212 west – Woodstock | Northern end of NY 212 concurrency; exit 20 on I-87 / Thruway |
| Ulster | Town of Saugerties | 69.74 | 112.24 | NY 32A west – Palenville, Hunter | Eastern terminus of NY 32A; hamlet of Saxton |
| Greene | Town of Catskill | 72.42 | 116.55 | NY 23A to US 9W – Palenville, Catskill | |
| Greene | Cairo | 80.02 | 128.78 | NY 23 east to I-87 Toll / New York Thruway – Catskill | Southern end of NY 23 concurrency |
| Greene | Cairo | 81.14 | 130.58 | NY 23 west to NY 145 – East Durham, Windham | Northern end of NY 23 concurrency; hamlet of Cairo |
| Greene | Greenville | 89.87 | 144.63 | NY 81 – Cooksburg, Coxsackie | Hamlet of Greenville |
| Albany | Westerlo | 96.05 | 154.58 | NY 143 west – Westerlo | Southern end of NY 143 concurrency; hamlet of Dormansville |
| Albany | Coeymans | 98.36 | 158.30 | NY 143 east – Ravena | Northern end of NY 143 concurrency |
| Albany | Bethlehem | 108.23 | 174.18 | Feura Bush Road (NY 910A east) – Bethlehem Center | Former routing of NY 32; hamlet of Houcks Corners |
| Albany | Bethlehem | 110.29 | 177.49 | NY 335 – Elsmere, Delmar | |
| Albany | Bethlehem | 112.33 | 180.78 | US 9W south – Ravena | Southern end of US 9W concurrency |
| Albany | Bethlehem | 112.72 | 181.41 | US 9W north to I-87 Toll / New York Thruway – Albany | Northern end of US 9W concurrency |
| Albany | Bethlehem | 113.36 | 182.44 | NY 144 south – Selkirk, Coeymans | Northern terminus of NY 144 |
| Albany | Albany | 114.89 | 184.90 | I-787 north – Empire Plaza, Rensselaer, Troy | Exit 2 on I-787 |
| Albany | Albany | 115.54 | 185.94 | US 20 west (Madison Avenue) to I-787 | Southern end of US 20 concurrency |
| Albany | Albany | 115.62 | 186.07 | US 9 south / US 20 east (Dunn Memorial Bridge) – Rensselaer | Interchange; northern end of US 20 concurrency |
| Albany | Albany | 115.84 | 186.43 | NY 5 (State Street) | No left turns |
| Albany | Albany | 116.18 | 186.97 | I-787 / US 9 to I-87 Toll / New York Thruway – Troy, Rensselaer | Exit 4B on I-787 |
| Albany | Menands | 118.69 | 191.01 | I-787 | Exit 6 on I-787 |
| Albany | Menands | 119.74 | 192.70 | NY 378 to I-787 – Troy, Loudonville | Parclo interchange |
| Albany | Watervliet | 121.85 | 196.10 | NY 155 west (13th Street) to I-87 – Latham | Eastern terminus of NY 155 |
| Albany | Watervliet | 122.32 | 196.85 | NY 2 (19th Street) to I-87 – Troy, Latham | To Congress Street Bridge |
| Albany | Town of Colonie | | | To NY 7 / NY 787 (Cohoes Boulevard) | Access via Tibbits Avenue |
| Albany | Cohoes | 125.37 | 201.76 | NY 470 (Ontario Street) – Troy | To 112th Street Bridge |
| Albany | Cohoes | | | NY 787 south (Cohoes Boulevard) | Northern terminus of NY 787 |
| Mohawk River | | 125.4 | 201.8 | Route 32 Mohawk River Bridge | |
| Saratoga | Village of Waterford | 127.20 | 204.71 | US 4 south (Broad Street) – Troy | Southern end of US 4 concurrency |
| Saratoga | Mechanicville | 134.48 | 216.42 | NY 146 west to I-87 – Clifton Park | Eastern terminus of NY 146 |
| Saratoga | Mechanicville | 136.01 | 218.89 | NY 67 west (Saratoga Avenue) to I-87 – Round Lake, Malta, Ballston Spa | Southern end of NY 67 concurrency |
| Saratoga | Mechanicville | 136.11 | 219.05 | NY 67 east (North Main Street) – Schaghticoke | Northern end of NY 67 concurrency |
| Saratoga | Village of Stillwater | 138.81 | 223.39 | Stillwater Bridge Road (NY 915C east) – Schaghticoke, Lock 4 State Canal Park | Former NY 67 |
| Saratoga | Town of Stillwater | 141.32 | 227.43 | US 4 north – Schuylerville | Northern end of US 4 concurrency; hamlet of Bemis Heights |
| Saratoga | Town of Stillwater | 143.61 | 231.12 | NY 423 west – Saratoga Lake | Eastern terminus of NY 423 |
| Saratoga | Schuylerville | 153.65 | 247.28 | US 4 south – Stillwater | Southern end of US 4 concurrency |
| Saratoga | Schuylerville | | | CR 338 west (Burgoyne Street) | Eastern terminus of CR 338; former NY 338 |
| Saratoga | Schuylerville | 153.84 | 247.58 | NY 29 east (Ferry Street) – Greenwich | Southern end of NY 29 concurrency |
| Saratoga | Schuylerville | 154.13 | 248.05 | NY 29 west to I-87 – Saratoga Springs | Northern end of NY 29 concurrency |
| Saratoga | Northumberland | 155.92 | 250.93 | US 4 north – Fort Edward, Hudson Falls | Northern end of US 4 concurrency; hamlet of Northumberland |
| Saratoga | Northumberland | 163.39 | 262.95 | NY 50 south to I-87 – Saratoga Springs | Northern terminus of NY 50; hamlet of Gansevoort |
| Saratoga | Moreau | 167.68 | 269.85 | NY 197 – Fort Edward | Hamlet of Reynolds Corners |
| Saratoga | South Glens Falls | 170.26 | 274.01 | US 9 south to I-87 – Saratoga Springs | Southern end of US 9 concurrency |
| Warren | Glens Falls | 171.76 | 276.42 | US 9 north / NY 9L north / CR 28 west to I-87 – Queensbury, Lake George | Northern end of US 9 concurrency; southern terminus of NY 9L; eastern terminus of CR 28 |
| Warren | Queensbury | 173.40 | 279.06 | Lower Warren Street (NY 911E east) | Former NY 32B |
| Warren | Queensbury | 173.65 | 279.46 | NY 254 to I-87 / US 4 south | |
| Washington | Kingsbury | 175.62 | 282.63 | US 4 – Hudson Falls, Fort Ann | |
| Washington | Kingsbury | 176.73 | 284.42 | NY 196 / CR 37 south – Hartford, Granville | Northern terminus; northern terminus of CR 37 |
1.000 mi = 1.609 km; 1.000 km = 0.621 mi: Concurrency terminus; Electronic toll collection; Incomplete access

== Suffixed routes ==
Originally, NY 32 had two suffixed routes, NY 32A and NY 32B, that were absorbed by other routes. The NY 32A designation has since been revived for a short connector in the Hudson Valley.

- The NY 32A designation has been used for two distinct highways:
  - The first NY 32A was assigned as part of the 1930 renumbering of state highways in New York to the segment of modern NY 32 between Bemis Heights and Schuylerville in Saratoga County. At the time, NY 32 was routed on what is now US 4 between the two locations. The route was supplanted by a realigned NY 32 in the early 1940s.
  - The current NY 32A is a 1.92-mile (3.09 km) connector between NY 32 and NY 23A in Ulster and Greene counties. It was assigned in the early 1940s.
- NY 32B was assigned as part of the 1930 renumbering to an alternate route of NY 32 between Northumberland and Glens Falls in Saratoga, Washington, and Warren counties. It was truncated northward to Hudson Falls in the early 1940s and mostly replaced by NY 254 c. 1965.
