= New York State Route 335 =

North–south state highway in New York, U.S.

New York State Route 335
- Map of Albany and vicinity with NY 335 highlighted in red

Route information
- Maintained by NYSDOT
- Length: 1.77 mi (2.85 km)
- Existed: 1930s–present

Major junctions
- South end: Feura Bush Road in Bethlehem
- North end: NY 443 in Bethlehem

Location
- Country: United States
- State: New York
- Counties: Albany

Highway system
- New York Highways; Interstate; US; State; Reference; Parkways
← NY 334	→ NY 336

New York State Route 335 (NY 335) is a north–south state highway located within the town of Bethlehem in Albany County, New York, in the United States. It extends for 1.77 miles (2.85 km) from an intersection with Feura Bush Road near the hamlet of Delmar to a junction with NY 443 in the hamlet of Elsmere. The two-lane route, named Elsmere Avenue, also has an intersection with NY 32 about halfway through the route. NY 335 was assigned to its current alignment in the 1930s.

== Route description ==
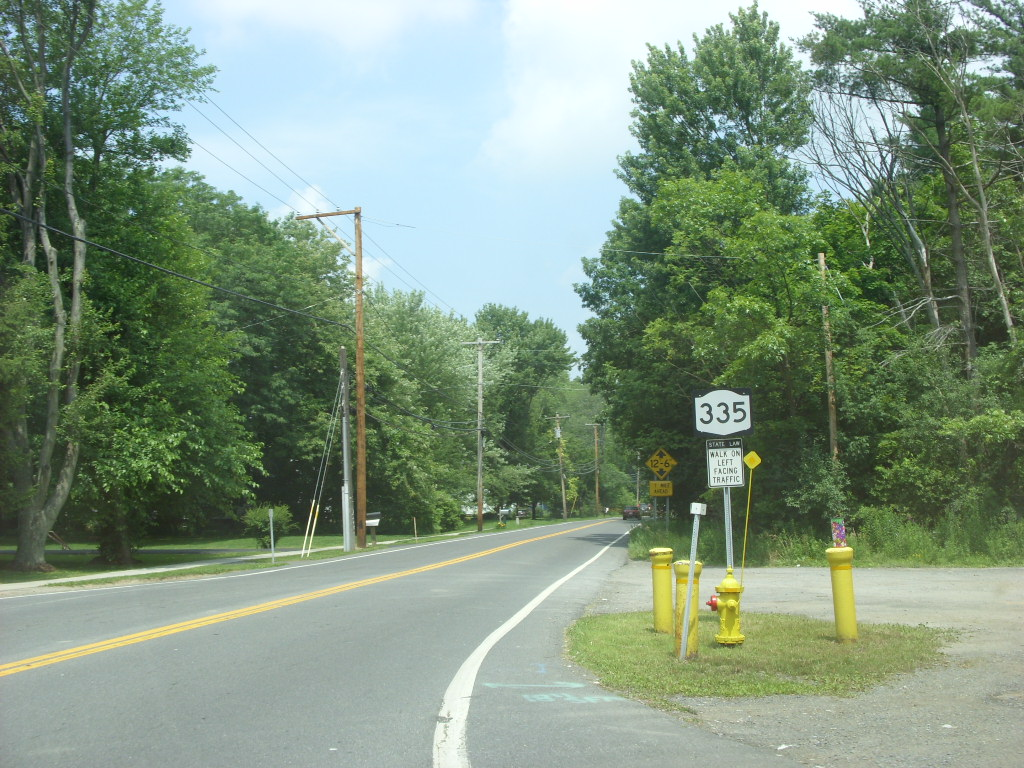
NY 335 northbound north of the NY 32 junction

NY 335 begins at an intersection with Feura Bush Road southeast of the hamlet of Delmar in the town of Bethlehem. Although Feura Bush Road is now NY 910A, an unsigned reference route, it was once part of NY 32. From Feura Bush Road, NY 335 heads northward as a two-lane street named Elsmere Avenue, passing several housing tracts in an otherwise open area of the town. After a half-mile (0.8 km), the route meets the Delmar Bypass, a four-lane divided highway carrying NY 32 through Bethlehem. Past the bypass, NY 335 traverses dense residential neighborhoods on its way to the hamlet of Elsmere, one of several communities located along NY 443.

In Elsmere, the route runs along the east side of Bethlehem Cemetery on its way to a junction with Kenwood Avenue, a local east–west street that becomes NY 140 at a junction less than 1 mile (1.6 km) to the west in the adjacent hamlet of Delmar. Continuing on, NY 335 serves two more blocks of homes before passing under an overpass that once carried a Delaware and Hudson Railway line. The abandoned overpass serves as a divider between the residential section of the community and Elsmere's central business district, where NY 335 ends at a junction with NY 443 (Delaware Avenue) one block north of the old railroad bridge.

== History ==
On May 11, 1914, the state of New York awarded a contract to rebuild Elsmere Avenue to state highway standards. The project cost $18,489 (equivalent to $580,407 in 2024), and the reconstructed road was added to the state highway system on October 27, 1914, as unsigned State Highway 1184. It did not receive a posted designation until the 1930s, when it was designated NY 335. At the time, the route connected to NY 32 at Feura Bush Road. In 1959, the state of New York developed plans for the Delmar Bypass, which would intersect NY 335 a short distance north of Feura Bush Road. The Bethlehem Central Board of Education had called for a grade-separated interchange between the highway and NY 335 to ensure the safety of school buses on the latter road, a major bus route; however, the junction was ultimately built as an at-grade intersection.

The Delmar Bypass was opened in December 1963, connecting Elm Avenue in the west to U.S. Route 9W in the east. The state did not add traffic lights to any of the four intersections on the bypass as a late 1963 study indicated that the signals were unnecessary. In mid-January 1964, the Bethlehem Town Board pushed the state to add traffic lights to every intersection in the wake of several accidents and near-misses at the crossings. This request was eventually granted. The Delmar Bypass did not have a signed route number until the 1970s when NY 32 was realigned to follow the highway. As a result, NY 335 no longer connected to a signed route at its south end.

== Major intersections ==
The entire route is in Bethlehem, Albany County.

mi	km	Destinations	Notes
0.00	0.00	Feura Bush Road (NY 910A) – Feura Bush	Southern terminus; former routing of NY 32
0.46	0.74	NY 32 (Delmar Bypass) – Albany	
1.77	2.85	NY 443 (Delaware Avenue)	Northern terminus; hamlet of Elsmere
1.000 mi = 1.609 km; 1.000 km = 0.621 mi
