= New York State Route 140 =

State highway in Albany County, New York, US

New York State Route 140
- Map of the Albany area with NY 140 highlighted in red

Route information
- Maintained by NYSDOT
- Length: 2.07 mi (3.33 km)
- Existed: mid-1930s–present

Major junctions
- West end: NY 85 in Bethlehem
- East end: NY 443 in Bethlehem

Location
- Country: United States
- State: New York
- Counties: Albany

Highway system
- New York Highways; Interstate; US; State; Reference; Parkways
← NY 139	→ NY 141

New York State Route 140 (NY 140) is an east–west state highway located entirely within the town of Bethlehem in Albany County, New York, in the United States. The highway runs for 2.07 miles (3.33 km) from a roundabout with NY 85 near the hamlet of Slingerlands to an intersection with NY 443 in the hamlet of Delmar. The first mile (1.6 km) of the route is a four-lane divided highway named Cherry Avenue Extension, while the second mile follows a two-lane street known as Kenwood Avenue. NY 140 initially followed Kenwood Avenue from the center of Slingerlands to Delmar when it was assigned in the mid-1930s; however, the route was altered to bypass Slingerlands in the mid-1970s.

== Route description ==
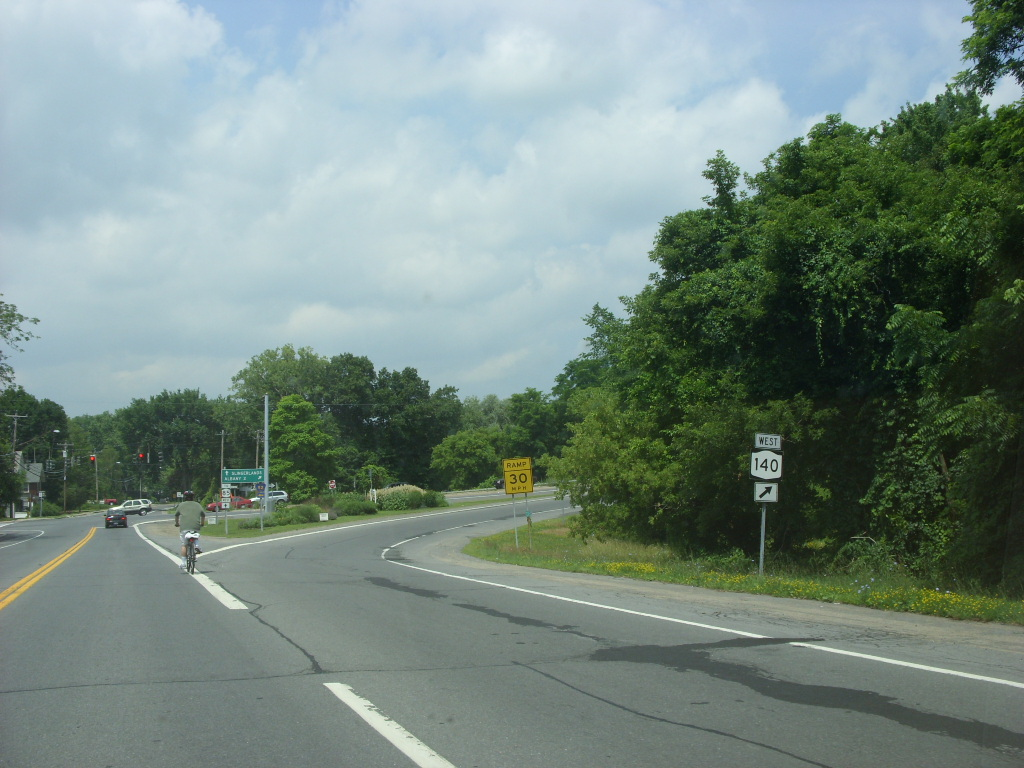
NY 140 westbound at CR 52 near Slingerlands

NY 140 begins at a roundabout with NY 85 northeast of Slingerlands, a hamlet in the northeastern part of the town of Bethlehem. The highway initially heads southeastward around Slingerlands, following a four-lane divided highway known as Cherry Avenue Extension for roughly 1 mile (1.6 km) through an area of forests. NY 140 intersects two local roads before reaching a four-way junction with Kenwood Avenue. Here, the route turns east onto the two-lane Kenwood Avenue while the divided highway continues southward as County Route 52 (CR 52, named Cherry Avenue). To the west, a town-owned section of Kenwood Avenue directly connects NY 140 to Slingerlands and serves as a shortcut to NY 85 west.

The Kenwood Avenue portion of the route heads generally eastward through mostly residential neighborhoods. After 1 mile (1.6 km), it enters the hamlet of Delmar, a large community built up along NY 443. In Delmar, the route passes through areas of more commercial nature before terminating at an intersection with NY 443. The junction is located just 0.5 miles (0.8 km) from the northern terminus of NY 335, which ends at another junction with NY 443 in nearby Elsmere.

== History ==
The section of Kenwood Avenue between New Scotland Road (now NY 85) at Slingerlands and Delaware Avenue (NY 443) at Delmar was added to the state highway system on December 13, 1904, as the unsigned State Highway 92. It did not receive a posted designation until the mid-1930s when it was designated as NY 140. The west end of NY 140 was realigned in the mid-1970s to follow Cherry Avenue Extension, a divided highway continuation of Cherry Avenue (CR 52) that bypassed Slingerlands to the northeast. On December 7, 2006, the divided highway portion of NY 140 was ceremoniously designated as the Captain Timothy J. Moshier Memorial Highway. Moshier, a Bethlehem native, was a captain in the United States Army who was killed on April 1, 2006, during the Iraq War.

== Major intersections ==
The entire route is in Bethlehem, Albany County.

mi	km	Destinations	Notes
0.00	0.00	NY 85 to I-90 – Albany, Slingerlands /New Scotland Road	Western terminus; roundabout; New Scotland Road is a former routing of NY 85
1.28	2.06	CR 52 south (Cherry Avenue) / Kenwood Avenue to NY 85 west – Slingerlands	
2.07	3.33	NY 443 (Delaware Avenue) to I-787 / I-87 Toll / New York Thruway	Eastern terminus; hamlet of Delmar
1.000 mi = 1.609 km; 1.000 km = 0.621 mi
