= New York State Route 443 =

Highway in New York

New York State Route 443
- Map of Capital District in eastern New York with NY 443 highlighted in red

Route information
- Maintained by NYSDOT and the city of Albany
- Length: 33.44 mi (53.82 km)
- Existed: early 1970s–present

Major junctions
- West end: NY 30 in Schoharie
- East end: US 9W / US 20 in Albany

Location
- Country: United States
- State: New York
- Counties: Schoharie, Albany

Highway system
- New York Highways; Interstate; US; State; Reference; Parkways
← NY 442	→ NY 444

New York State Route 443 (NY 443) is an east–west state highway in the Capital District of New York in the United States. The route begins at an intersection with NY 30 in the town of Schoharie and ends 33.44 miles (53.82 km) later at a junction with U.S. Route 9W (US 9W) and US 20 in the city of Albany. It ascends the Helderberg Escarpment in the towns of Berne and New Scotland. Within the town of Bethlehem and the city of Albany, NY 443 is known as Delaware Avenue.

NY 443 was originally designated as the Albany County portion of NY 43 in the 1920s, but the NY 43 designation was truncated to Rensselaer in the early 1970s. The portion of NY 43 west of Madison Avenue in Albany was then redesignated as NY 443. Many of the reference markers along NY 443 bear the number "43" instead.

== Route description ==
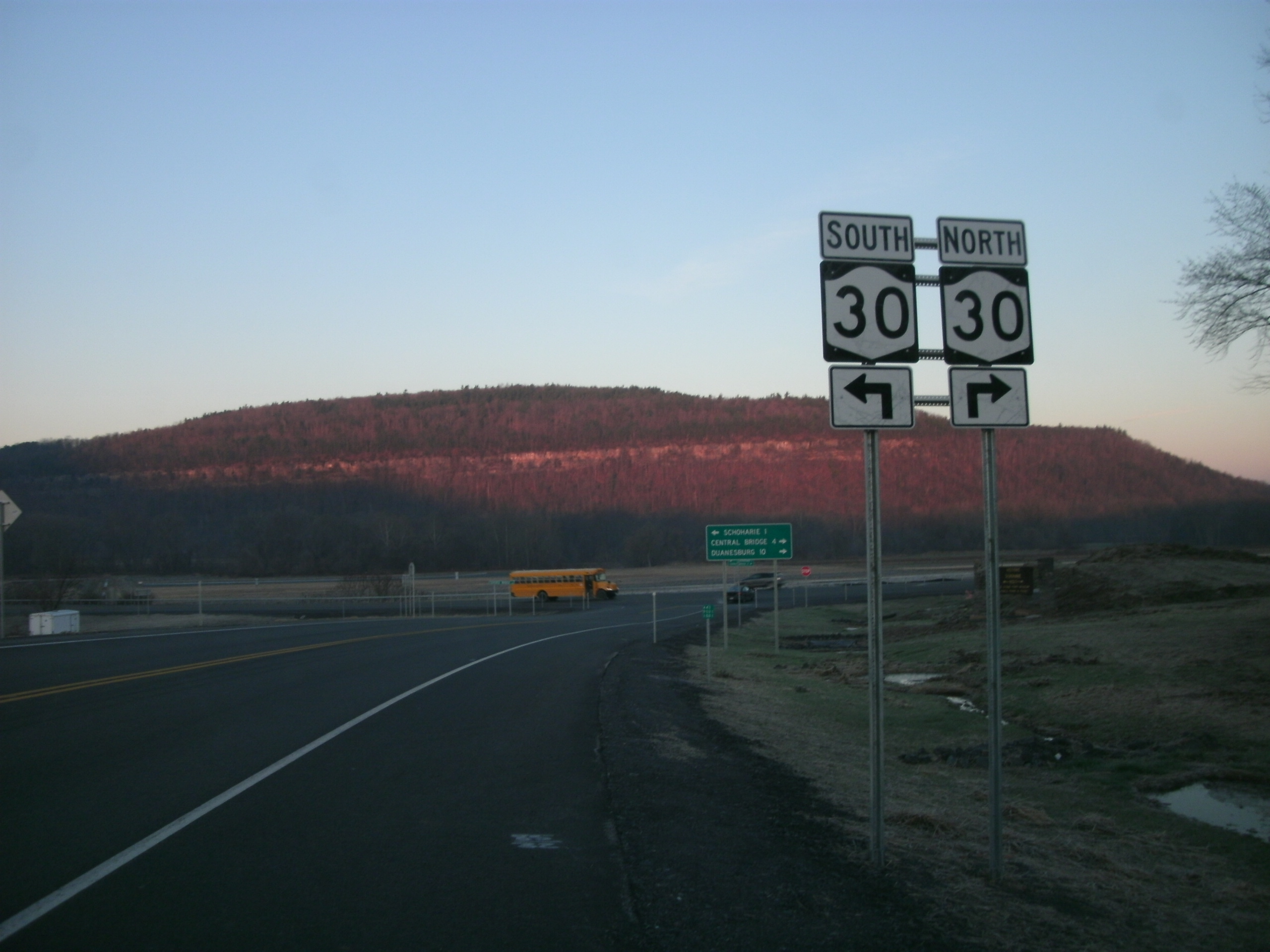
NY 443 at the junction with NY 30 in Schoharie

NY 443 begins at an intersection with NY 30 in the town of Schoharie, just north of the namesake village. NY 443 proceeds east along a tributary of Schoharie Creek, crossing through rural parts of Schoharie County as a two-lane roadway. The route begins to wind eastward as it enters the hamlet of Shutters Corners, bending southeast through the town of Wright. After leaving the residential hamlet of Shutters Corners, NY 443 continues creekside through Wright, entering the hamlet of Gallupville. In the residential community, NY 443 turns southward at a junction with the western terminus of NY 146.

At the Factory Street intersection, NY 443 turns eastward through Gallupville, turning southeast once again at a junction with County Route 24 (CR 24; Knox Road). NY 443 and CR 24 parallel each other through Wright as they leave Gallupville, paralleling a nearby creek before it turns southeast along Fox Creek. After a long stretch along Fox Creek, NY 443 turns east at Freeman Hill Road, turning southeast again after Schell Road. A short distance southeast of Schell Road, NY 443 and Fox Creek cross the county line into Albany County. Now in the town of Knox. Now known as Helderberg Trail, NY 443 turns south into the hamlet of West Berne. In West Berne, the route turns east at a junction with CR 9 (Bradt Hollow Road).

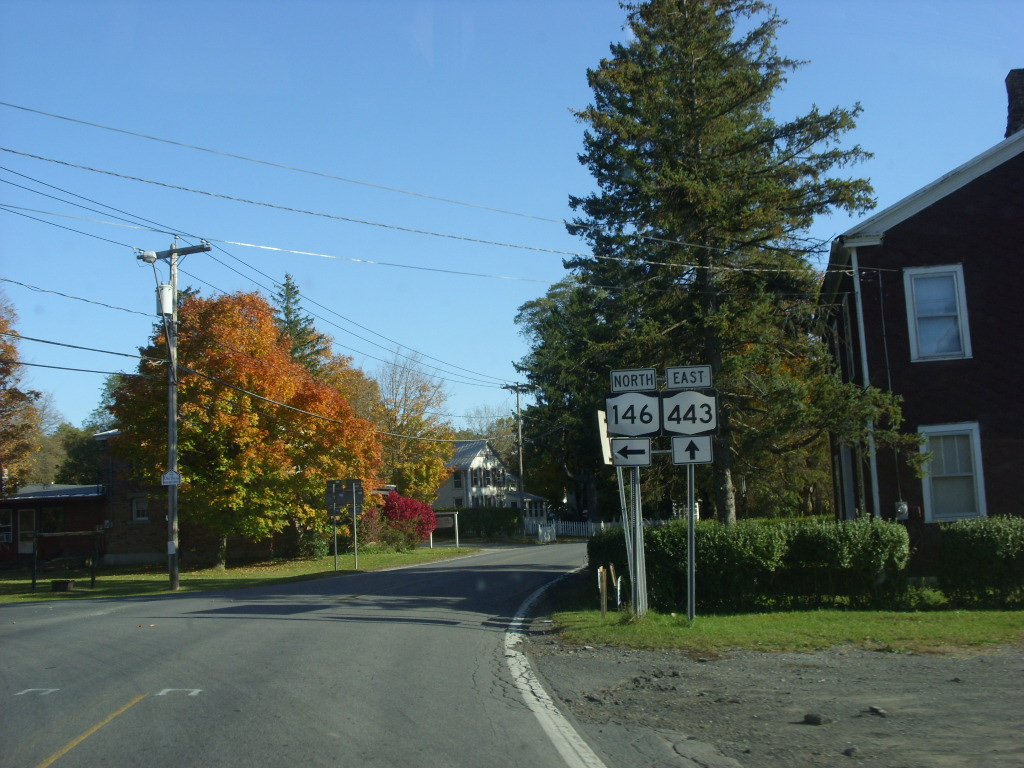
NY 443 at NY 146 in Gallupville

Crossing east through West Berne, NY 443 continues along the creek, soon leaving West Berne for the town of Berne. The route crosses CR 1 (Switz Kill Road) and skirts the northern edge of Town of Berne Park. At the junction with the eastern terminus of CR 9 (Canaday Hill Road), NY 443 enters the hamlet of Berne, becoming the main commercial street, turning northward at a junction with Irish Hill Road. At the northern end of the north stretch, the route intersects with the western terminus of NY 156 (Berne–Altamont Road). NY 443 continues east along Helderberg Trail through Berne, soon turning southeast through the town. At the junction with Turner Road, the route bends southward, then turns eastward once again.

Continuing east through Berne, NY 443 becomes a two-lane rural roadway, reaching the hamlet of East Berne. The route passes south of Warners Lake and intersects with Thacher Park Road (NY 910J) just south of that road's junction with NY 157A. Bending southeast out of East Berne, NY 443 passes south of a local airstrip, bending southeast through the rural community. At the junction with CR 303 (Pinnacle Road), NY 443 makes a short dart to the southeast and intersects with NY 85 (Delaware Turnpike). Dropping the Helderberg Trail moniker, NY 443 and NY 85 become concurrent along Delaware Turnpike, passing south of Helderberg Lake. NY 443 and NY 85 remain a two-lane residential road, crossing into the town of New Scotland.

After passing the Letter S roads, NY 443 and NY 85 turn southeast, reaching a junction with New Scotland Road, where NY 85 turns eastward. NY 443 continues southward on Delaware Turnpike. Crossing through a wooded section of New Scotland, NY 443 soon bends southeast, reaching the northern terminus of CR 312 (Clarksville South Road). After a short distance east, through the residential neighborhood of New Scotland, intersecting with the western terminus of CR 301 (Tarrytown Road), which eventually becomes NY 396 in Bethlehem. Continuing east along Delaware Turnpike, NY 443 leaves the residential area, returning to the dense woods in New Scotland.

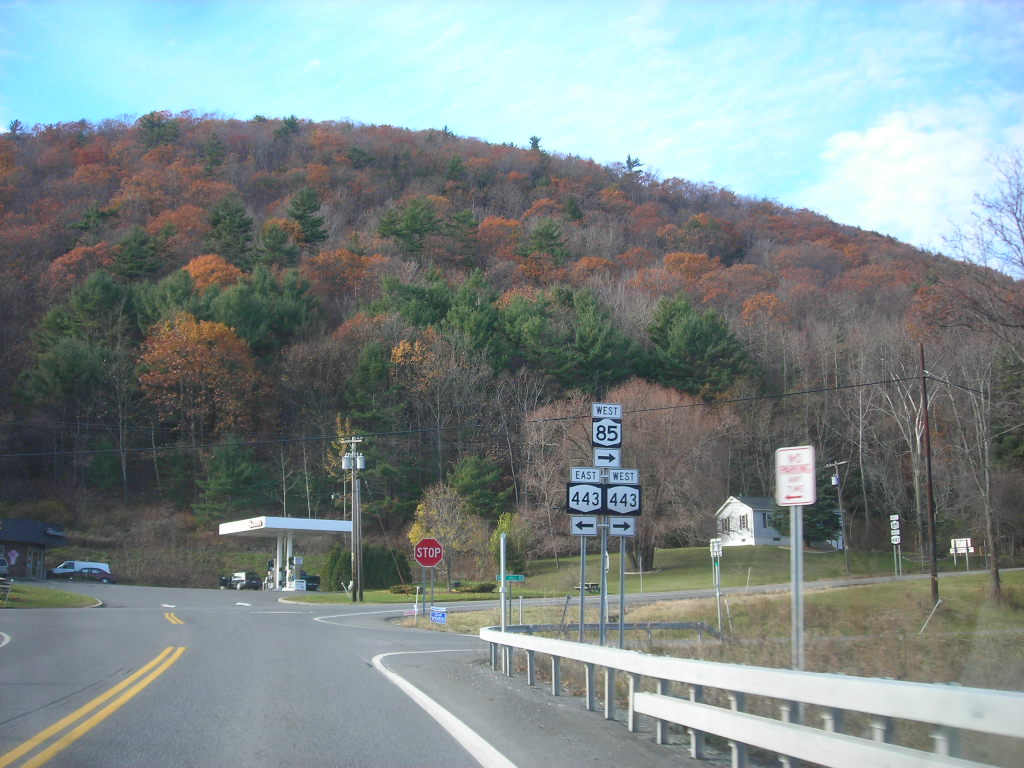
NY 85 at the junction with NY 443 in the town of Berne

Bending northeast through New Scotland, NY 443 crosses multiple residential roads that branch off, soon crossing into another residential area near the junction with CR 308 (New Scotland South Road). Entering the hamlet of Unionville, NY 443 crosses another junction with CR 308 (Feura Bush Unionville Road). NY 443 crosses under the Selkirk Subdivision of CSX Transportation, passing through the center of Unionville. The route bends northward and crosses into the town of Bethlehem, changing names to Delaware Avenue. Passing south of multiple housing residences, NY 443 passes an intersection with CR 52 (Elm Avenue / Cherry Avenue).

After crossing CR 52, NY 443 continues northeast along Delaware Avenue, entering the hamlet of Delmar. Along this stretch, NY 443 is a long residential street, intersecting with the eastern terminus of NY 140 (Kenwood Avenue) in the center of Delmar. Reaching the hamlet of Elsmere, NY 443 intersects with the northern terminus of NY 335 (Elsmere Avenue). Near Euclid Avenue, the route begins to parallel the Normans Kill, crossing under the New York State Thruway (I-87) just east of the latter's exit 23. The route now enters the city of Albany, crossing through the Delaware Avenue section of the city. A commercial and residential street, NY 443 soon intersects with US 9W (Southern Boulevard).

NY 443 and US 9W continue northeast along Delaware Avenue, running along the western edge of Lincoln Park, crossing into the Capitol Hill section of Albany. In this neighborhood, NY 443 and US 9W turn north into a junction with US 20 (Madison Avenue). At this intersection, US 9W runs north on Lark Street, while NY 443 terminates at this intersection and the right-of-way merges into Lark Street.

== History ==
NY 443 roughly follows an 18th-century trail of the Mohawk Indians from the Hudson River to Schoharie Valley. It was probably a few years before 1787 when Stephen Van Rensselaer III had it upgraded and straightened slightly to make it accessible by wagons. Before that the settlers in the Beaver Dam as the Town of Berne is now known, had to go by way of the wagon road from Altamont, through what is now Knox, to the Schoharie Valley.

In the mid-1920s, the entirety of modern NY 443 was designated as part of NY 43, a highway extending from NY 9 (now NY 7) in the hamlet of Central Bridge north of Schoharie to Albany. The 1930 renumbering of state highways in New York brought about a pair of changes in NY 43's alignment. On its western end, it was truncated to a junction with the newly created NY 30 just north of Schoharie. To the east, NY 43 was extended east through Albany and across the Hudson River to the Massachusetts state line. NY 43 was truncated on its western end in the early 1970s to Rensselaer, a city bordering Albany on the eastern bank of the Hudson River. Its former routing from Schoharie to Madison Avenue in Albany was redesignated as NY 443. Many of the reference markers along NY 443 still bear the number "43".

== Major intersections ==
County	Location	mi	km	Destinations	Notes
Schoharie	Town of Schoharie	0.00	0.00	NY 30 to I-88 – Schoharie, Central Bridge, Duanesburg	Western terminus
Schoharie	Wright	3.79	6.10	NY 146 east – Altamont, Guilderland	Western terminus of NY 146; hamlet of Gallupville
Albany	Berne	10.62	17.09	NY 156 north (Berne–Altamont Road) – Altamont	Southern terminus of NY 156; hamlet of Berne
Albany	Berne	14.07	22.64	NY 910J (Thatcher Park Road) to NY 157A – Wagner Lake, Thacher Park, Thompsons Lake	Southern terminus of NY 910J; hamlet of East Berne
Albany	Berne	17.64	28.39	NY 85 west (Delaware Turnpike) – Rensselaerville, Westerlo	Western terminus of NY 85 / NY 443 overlap
Albany	New Scotland	19.66	31.64	NY 85 east (New Scotland Road) – Voorheesville, Albany	Eastern terminus of NY 85 / NY 443 overlap
Albany	Bethlehem	29.29	47.14	NY 140 west (Kenwood Avenue) – Slingerlands	Eastern terminus of NY 140; hamlet of Delmar
Albany	Bethlehem	29.96	48.22	NY 335 south (Elsmere Avenue)	Northern terminus of NY 335; hamlet of Elsmere
Albany	Albany	32.09	51.64	US 9W south (Southern Boulevard) to I-787 / I-87 Toll / New York Thruway – Glenmont, Ravena	Southern terminus of US 9W / NY 443 overlap;
Albany	Albany	33.44	53.82	US 9W north (Lark Street) / US 20 (Madison Avenue)	Eastern terminus, northern terminus of US 9W / NY 443 overlap
1.000 mi = 1.609 km; 1.000 km = 0.621 mi: Concurrency terminus
