= Elsmere, New York =

- Hamlet
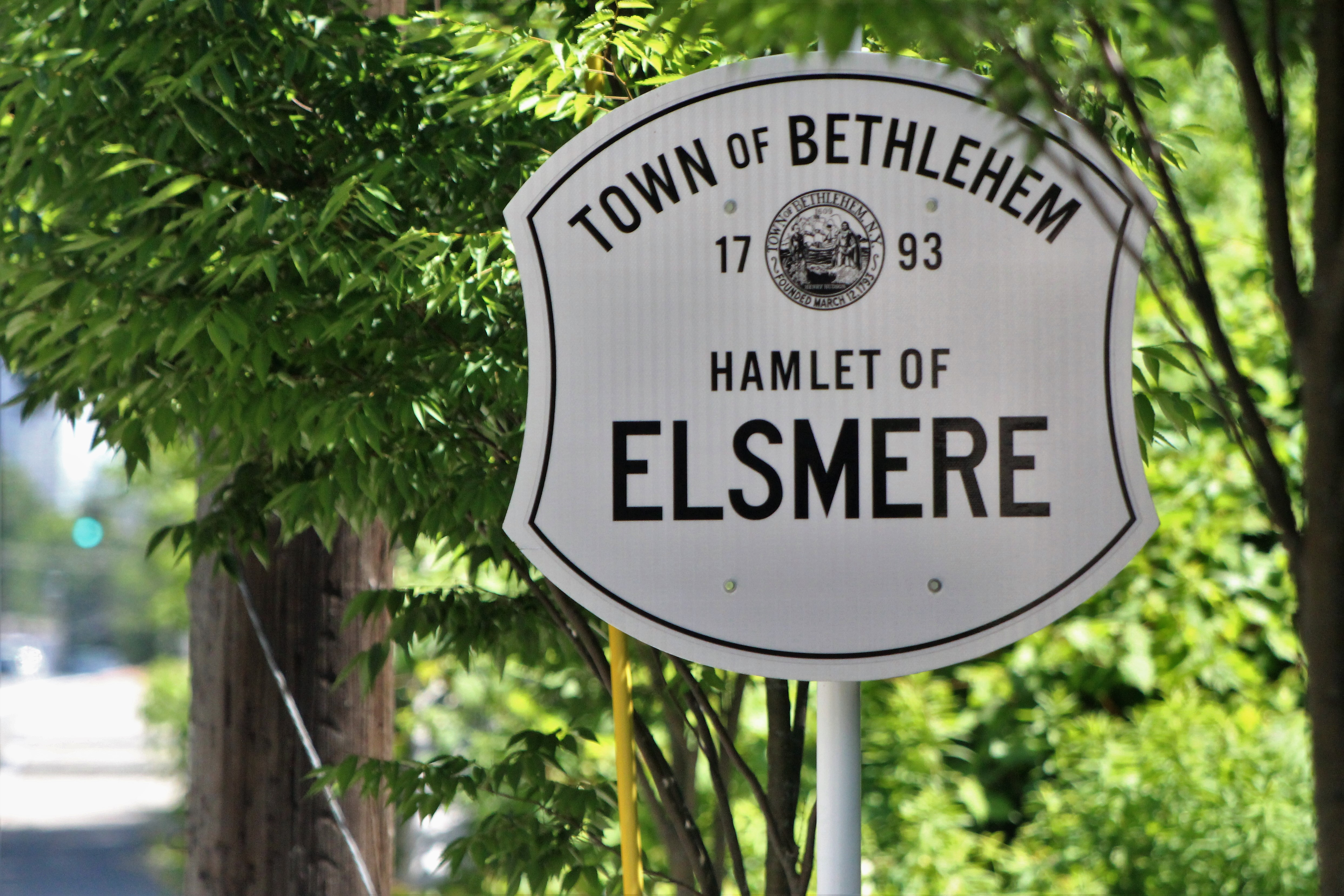

- Location within New York Location within the United States
- Coordinates: 42°37′43″N 73°49′0″W
- Country: United States
- State: New York
- Region: Capital District
- County: Albany
- Town: Bethlehem
- Settled: 1920s
- Named after: Robert Elsmere, hero of Mrs. Humphry Ward's 1888 book titled Elsmere
- Time zone: UTC-5 (EST)
  - Summer (DST): UTC-4 (EDT)
- ZIP Code: 12054 (Delmar)
- Area code: 518

Elsmere is a hamlet of the town of the Bethlehem in Albany County, New York, United States. The hamlet is a suburb of the neighboring city of Albany. From the northeast to the southwest, it is bisected by New York Route 443 (Delaware Avenue), which is also the hamlet's main street and a major commuter route into Albany. Delaware Avenue is also home to most of the office and retail locations in Elsmere, including the largest such location: Delaware Plaza.

Elsmere does not have its own Post Office nor Zip Code, instead sharing with neighboring hamlet of Delmar. All locations in Elsmere use Delmar 12054 as the official address city and Zip Code.

== History ==
Elsmere is situated along Delaware Avenue (State Route 443), formerly known as Delaware Turnpike. Suburban residential growth began to displace the rural farmland starting in 1928 when the Delaware Avenue Bridge opened across the Normans Kill; the bridge connected Elsmere directly to Albany. Prior to this, commuters to Albany used narrow, winding roads through Normansville and a smaller lower bridge. The original center of the hamlet was the intersection of Elsmere Avenue and Delaware Avenue. By 1993, Delaware Avenue from the bridge over the Normans Kill to the abandoned railroad bridge marking Elsmere's unofficial border with Delmar had become heavily commercialized. Many of the businesses along Delaware Avenue occupied houses that had been converted to commercial use. Delaware Plaza, built in 1955, is the unofficial "center" of the hamlet of Elsmere.

== Education ==
Elsmere is located with the Bethlehem Central School District, which consistently receives local and national recognition for excellence. Elsmere Elementary is located within the hamlet on Delaware Ave just East of Elsmere Ave. Transportation is provided by the Bethlehem Central School District Student Transportation Department. BCSD students residing in Elsmere attend the following schools:

- Elsmere Elementary (Elsmere): K-5
- Bethlehem Central Middle School (Delmar): 6-8
- Bethlehem Central High School (Delmar): 9-12

BCSD Athletics is part of The New York State Public High School Athletic Association (NYSPHSAA) Section 2 - Capital District in the Suburban Council.

Elsmere is served by the Bethlehem Public Library located in Delmar.

== Emergency Services ==
=== Law Enforcement ===
Elsmere is served by the Town of Bethlehem Police Department.

Additional LE services are provided by Albany County Sheriff Office, New York State Police Troop G, and the FBI - Albany Office.

=== Ambulance ===
Elsmere is served by Delmar-Bethlehem EMS, in cooperation with Albany County Sheriff Office EMS Unit.

=== Fire Department ===
Elsmere is served by the Elsmere Fire District and Elsmere Fire Company A, Inc. The Fire District/Fire Company relationship is a joint and mutual effort toward a common goal: the protection of life and property.

==== Elsmere Fire District ====
Municipal Organization organized in 1928 for the purpose of providing the community fire protection, saving lives & property, suppress & control fires, fire prevention & education, support EMS activities, hazardous materials response, public assistance, and a safe working environment for Elsmere Fire Company A, Inc. EFD is responsible for the administration of taxpayer’s funds for fire suppression and prevention programs.

The Elsmere Fire District has two stations:

- Headquarters: Located at 15 West Poplar Drive, Delmar, NY 12054
- South Station: Located at 578 Feura Bush Rd, Glenmont, NY 12077

==== Elsmere Fire Company A, Inc ====
Formed in June 1922, EFC is the volunteer-based fire fighting force of the Elsmere Fire District. Membership includes 80 firefighters and social memberships numbering well over 200. EFC is a fraternal organization appointed by the Fire District to physically carry out the goals of the EFD.

EFC has a NYSFD drill team known as the Elsmere Wanderers, composed of active members of the Elsmere Fire Company, that competes in firematic competitions throughout the state. Events include both motorized and foot races, which utilize many aspects of everyday firefighting skills.

== Transportation ==
=== Roads ===
==== Interstate Highways ====
- Interstate 87: Part of the New York State Thruway, I-87 passes through the hamlet Northeast corner between the US-9W/ NY-32 overpass and the Town of Bethlehem- City of Albany border at Normans Kill. The nearest Thruway access is at Exit 23 in the City of Albany just North of Normans Kill.

==== Federal Routes ====
- US Route 9W: The hamlet eastern border runs along US Route 9W between The Town of Bethlehem- City of Albany border at Normans Kill to Beacon Rd.

==== State Routes ====
- NY Route 32: Known as Delmar Bypass, From interchange with US-9W at Eastern limits to the Western limits with Delmar hamlet about halfway between NY-335 (Elsmere Ave) and Murray Ave.
- NY Route 335: Known as Elsmere Ave, run from intersection with Delaware Ave (NY-443) at Northern Terminus to Feura Bush Rd (NY-910A) at Southern Terminus.
- NY Route 443: Known as Delaware Ave, this is considered Bethlehem's "Main St", running between the Town of Bethlehem - City of Albany border at the bridge over Normans Kill in the Normansville Neighborhood to the former D&H Railroad overpass that now carries the Albany County Helderberg-Hudson Rail Trail forming border with the hamlet of Delmar.
- NY Route 910A: Known as Feura Bush Rd, an unsigned NYS Reference Route and former alignment of NY-32, runs from Dowers Kill to the West to the traffic circle intersection with US-9W in Bethlehem Center to the East.

==== County Routes ====
- There are no Albany County routes located within the hamlet.

==== Important Town Roads ====
- Wemple Rd: Feura Bush Rd (NY-910A) to Beacon Rd
- Kenwood Ave: Oakwood Pl to Delmar Bypass (NY-32)
- Bender Ln: Elsmere Ave (NY-335) to US-9W
- Beacon Rd: Wemple Rd to US-9W

=== Airports ===
- Albany International Airport (ALB): Nearest commercial airport is located about 10 miles to the North in the Town of Colonie. ALB serves the Capital District with flights to many US cities. Major airlines that serve ALB include Southwest, American Airlines, Delta, Jetblue, United, and Allegiant.
- South Albany Airport: a general aviation airport, located about 4 miles to the Southwest in the hamlet of Selkirk.

=== Buses ===
Elsmere is served by the Capital District Transit Authority (CDTA). All buses are equipped with bike racks and can accommodate two wheelchairs. The following routes serve Elsmere directly or nearby:

- Trunk Route 18 - Delaware Ave (Blue): 7 days/ week; Slingerlands (Market 32) to Downtown Albany (Pastures Neighborhood at Madison Ave & Green St), runs along Delaware Ave (NY-443) with stops within the hamlet at Hudson Ave, Rural Pl, Elsmere Ave (NY-335), #243 Delaware Ave (Elsmere Elementary School), Lincoln Ave, Salisbury Rd, Snowden Ave, Normanskill Ave (Delaware Plaza/ NYS Dept of Public Service), #154 Delaware Ave (Delmar Mini Mall), Delaware Ave Park & Ride, Mason Rd, #99 Delaware Ave (Albany Medical Ctr), Grant St.
- Neighborhood Route 107 - Albany Glenmont (Green): 7 days/ week; Glenmont (Market 32) to Downtown Albany (Ten Broeck Triangle Neighborhood at Van Tromp St & N. Pearl St (Empire Live)). There are no stops directly in the hamlet, but the nearest stops run along US-9W at the eastern limits of Elsmere in Glenmont including stops at Market 32 in Bethlehem Center, Bender Ln in Glenmont, Walmart in Glenmont, and #262 US-9W (Mt. Moriah Church) in Glenmont.
- Express Route 519 - Delmar Bypass Express (Yellow): Weekdays only; Voorheesville (Maple Ave & Voorheesville Ave) to Downtown Albany (Broadway & Steuben St). There are no stops directly in the hamlet, but the nearest stops include Elm Ave Park & Ride at Elm Ave & Delmar Bypass in Delmar; and US-9W & McCarty Ave in Albany (Delaware Ave Neighborhood)

=== Railroad ===
==== Current ====
There is no passenger rail station that serves the hamlet directly. The nearest passenger rail station is the Joseph L. Bruno Rail Station in Rensselaer served by Amtrak.

==== Historic ====
Elsmere used to have passenger rail service provided by the Albany & Susquehanna Railroad, taken over by Delaware & Hudson Railroad. The A&S Railroad first came through Elsmere in 1863. In 1873, the A&S railroad line was leased to the Delaware & Hudson Railway and by July 1945, A&S was merged into the D&H Railroad. The Elsmere station was built in 1899 per D&H. Passenger service was discontinued in 1933 due to the increasing popularity of personal automobiles combined with frequent bus service between Elsmere and Albany. Freight service continued on the line through Elsmere through the early 1990's. In 1991, D&H was purchased by Canadian Pacific Railway. In 2003, CP proposed abandoning the 9.8 mile line between Voorheesville and Albany. In 2009, Albany County filed a railbanking application and purchased the Right-of-Way, transforming the entire length of the line into the Albany County Helderberg-Hudson Rail Trail, a multi-use recreational trail. Remnants of the Elsmere train station can be seen today, traveling South on Elsmere Ave under the rail trail overpass, on the left side is a set of concrete stairs that used to lead to the station. The D&H logo can be faintly seen on the overpass as well.
