= Siamese Ponds Wilderness Area =

Area in New York state

- IUCN category Ib (wilderness area)
- Location within the United States
- Location: Adirondack Park New York United States
- Nearest city: Lake Pleasant, NY
- Coordinates: 43°35′05″N 74°14′29″W
- Area: 114,010 acres (461.4 km^{2})
- Governing body: New York State Department of Environmental Conservation

The Siamese Ponds Wilderness Area, an Adirondack Park unit of the Forest Preserve, is located in the towns of Lake Pleasant, Wells and Indian Lake in Hamilton County and the towns of Johnsburg and Thurman in Warren County. It is one of the larger wilderness areas of the Northeast; extending about 18 miles (29 km) from north to south and about 13 miles (21 km) from east to west at its widest part.

It is roughly bounded by NY 28 on the north; by private land tracts near Thirteenth Lake, Gore Mountain and Bakers Mills and by New York State Route 8 on the east; by Route 8 on the south; and by Route 8, International Paper lands and Indian Lake on the west.

The area contains 33 bodies of water covering 945 acres (3.8 km^{2}), 33 miles (53 km) of foot trails, and 4 lean-tos.

The topography consists of relatively low rolling hills with a few mountain summits like Bullhead, Eleventh, Puffer and South Pond Mountains above the 3,000 foot (914 m) level. In addition, the area contains a large number of beaver meadows and swamps. On most of the higher elevations, except those in severely burned spots, spruce and hemlock predominate, while mixed hardwoods and softwoods cover the remainder of the area.

Some of the more popular natural features are Thirteenth Lake, Peaked Mountain, Chimney Mountain, Puffer Pond, Siamese Ponds, Augur Falls on the West Branch of the Sacandaga River, and John Pond. Chimney Mountain has ice caves that usually retain snow and ice through the summer months.

Thirteenth Lake has a small sand beach at the northern end that makes a very desirable spot for picnics, bathing and camping. There are also other desirable camping spots on this lake.

== See also ==
- List of Wilderness Areas in the Adirondack Park
