= Kibby =

Kibby may refer to:

== People ==
- Bill Kibby (1903–1942), British-born Australian Army soldier
- Morgan Kibby (born 1984), American actress and singer-songwriter

== Places ==
- Kibby Pond, southeast of Bakers Mills, New York
- Kibby Mountain, in Franklin County, Maine

== See also ==
- Kibbee
- Kibbie (disambiguation)
