= Puffer Pond =

Lake southwest of Christian Hill, New York

- Location within New York Location within the United States
- Location: Warren County, New York, United States
- Coordinates: 43°40′32″N 74°11′47″W
- Type: Lake
- Primary outflows: Puffer Pond Brook
- Basin countries: United States
- Surface area: 41 acres (0.17 km^{2})
- Average depth: 5 feet (1.5 m)
- Max. depth: 16 feet (4.9 m)
- Shore length^{1}: 1.3 miles (2.1 km)
- Surface elevation: 2,185 feet (666 m)
- Settlements: Christian Hill, New York
- ^{1} Shore length is not a well-defined measure.

Puffer Pond is a lake located southwest of Christian Hill, New York. Fish species present in the lake are brook trout, and black bullhead. Access by trail from Thirteenth Lake. No motors are allowed on this lake.
