= Hour Pond =

- Location within New York Location within the United States
- Location: Warren County, New York
- Coordinates: 43°42′2.55″N 74°9′39.78″W
- Type: Lake
- Primary outflows: Hour Pond Brook
- Basin countries: United States
- Surface area: 35 acres (0.14 km^{2})
- Average depth: 5 ft (1.5 m)
- Max. depth: 14 ft (4.3 m)
- Shore length^{1}: 1 mi (1.6 km)
- Surface elevation: 2,096 ft (639 m)
- Settlements: Christian Hill, New York
- ^{1} Shore length is not a well-defined measure.

Hour Pond is located southwest of Christian Hill, New York. Fish species present in the lake are brook trout, and sunfish. Access by trail from Thirteenth Lake. No motors are allowed on this lake.
