= Peaked Mountain (Warren County, New York) =

Mountain in New York, United States

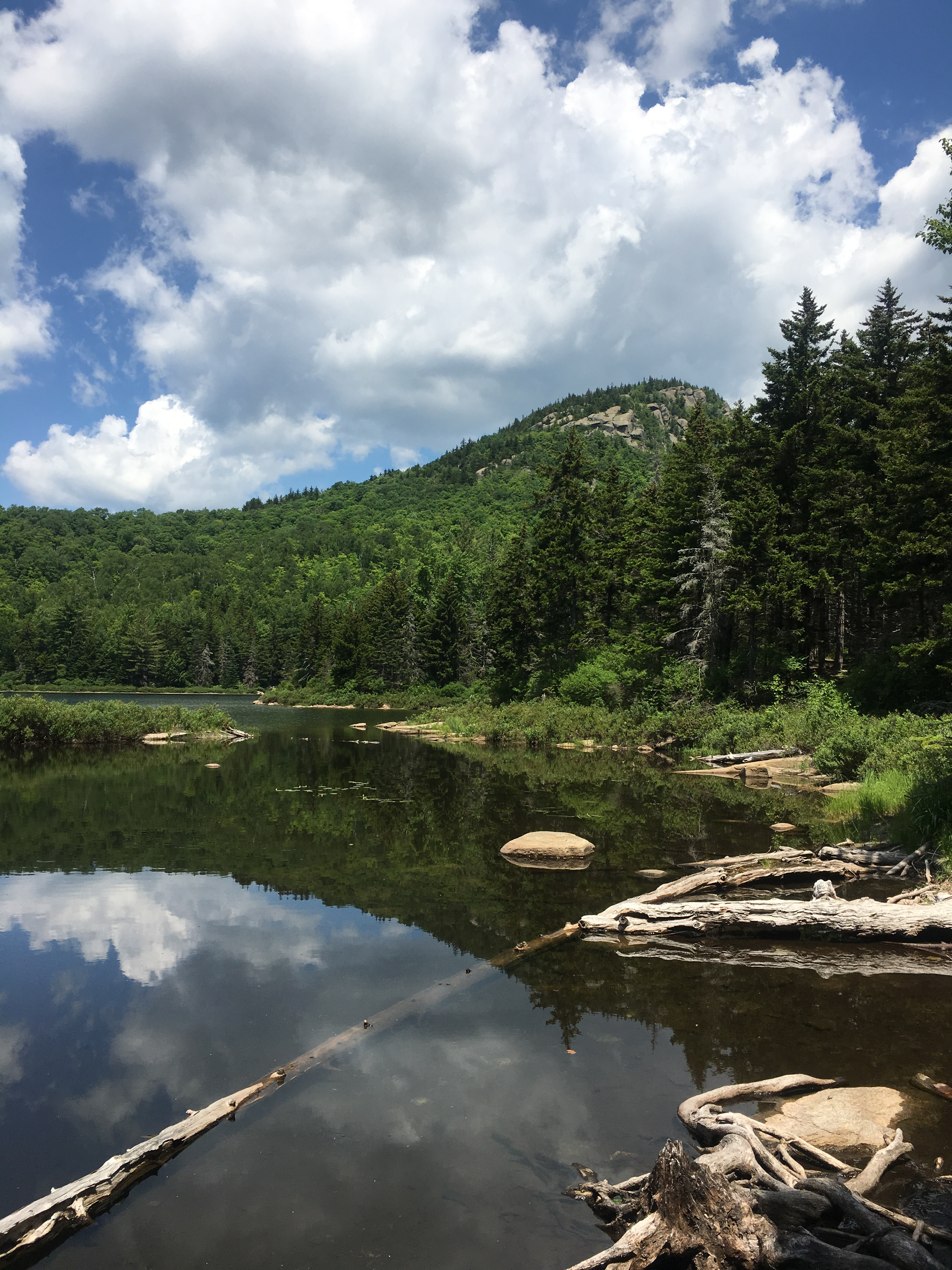
- Peaked Mountain in July 2020

Highest point
- Elevation: 2,894 feet (882 m)
- Coordinates: 43°43′41″N 74°08′53″W

Geography
- Location within New York Location within the United States
- Location: Johnsburg, New York
- Topo map: USGS Bullhead Mountain

Climbing
- Easiest route: Hike

Peaked Mountain is a mountain in the Adirondack Mountains of New York. It is located in the town of Johnsburg near the hamlet of North River. A hiking trail from Thirteenth Lake leads to the partially exposed summit.

== Geography ==
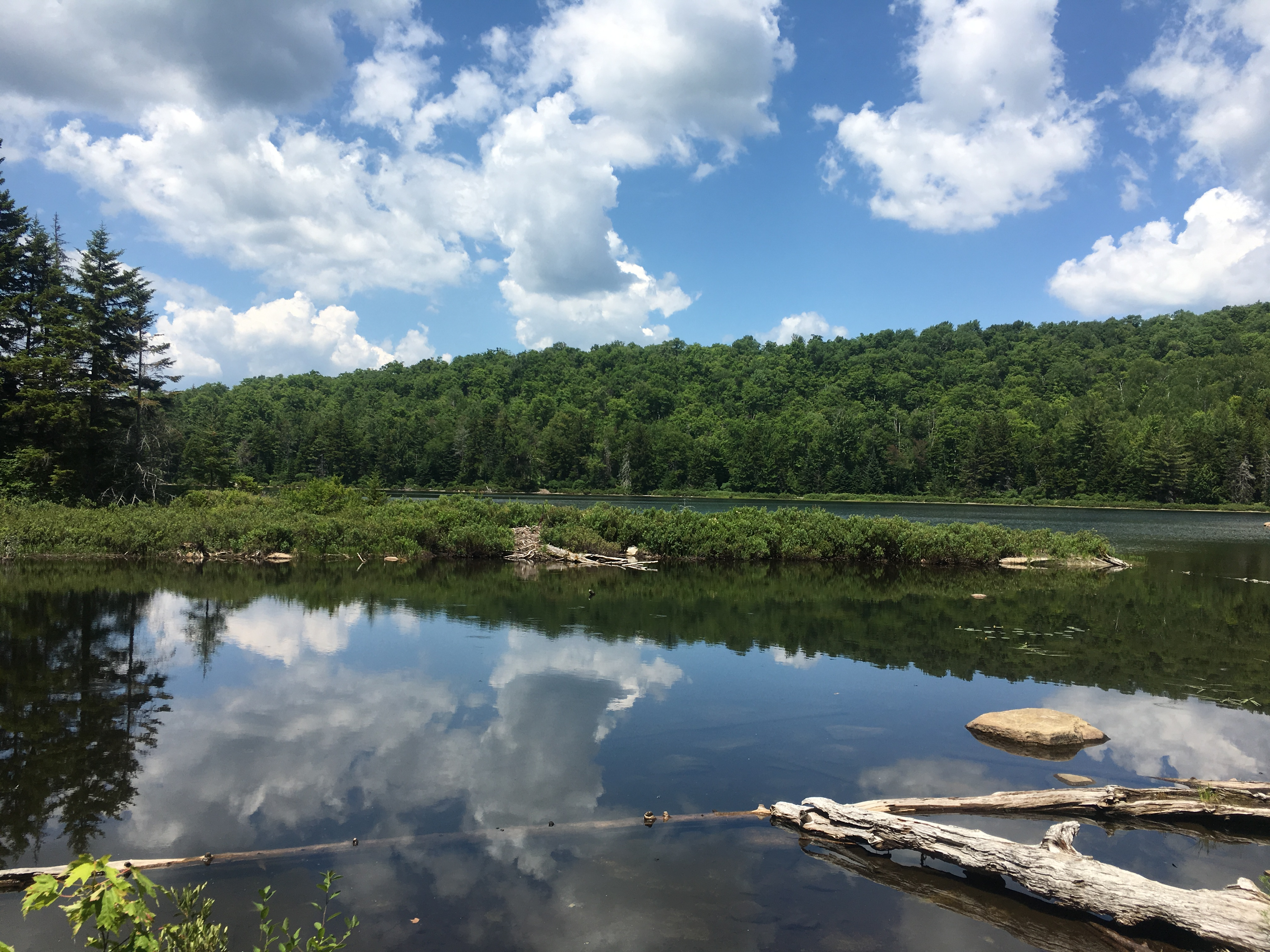
Peaked Mountain Pond

Peaked Mountain is located in the town of Johnsburg near the boundary of Warren and Hamilton counties. It reaches a height of 2,894 feet (882 m) and has a partially exposed summit. Peaked Mountain Pond lies to the southwest, while Slide Mountain, Big Thirteenth Lake Mountain and Thirteenth Lake lie to the southeast.

== Conservation ==
Peaked Mountain is part of the Siamese Ponds Wilderness Area. It is one mile away from a garnet mining operation, which has sought approval from the Adirondack Park Agency to expand its operation on property it owns on the edge of the wilderness area that would move a tailings pile closer.

== Recreation ==
The summit of Peaked Mountain is accessed by a 7 miles (11 km) round-trip out-and-back hiking trail that covers 1,270 feet (390 m) of elevation gain. According to the Times Union, Peaked Mountain provides a "challenging but manageable climb" that balances rugged terrain and summit views without long distances or technical climbing. The trail begins along Thirteenth Lake, which offers swimming and camping spots, before turning toward Peaked Mountain Pond and the final climb to the summit. The trail is accessible in winter with snowshoes and crampons. Summit views extend to the south and west.
