= Siamese Ponds =

- Location within New York Siamese Ponds (the United States)
- Location: Warren County, New York, United States
- Coordinates: 43°37′07″N 74°11′01″W
- Type: Lakes
- Basin countries: United States
- Surface elevation: 2,119 feet (646 m)
- Settlements: Oregon, New York

Siamese Ponds are located northwest of Oregon, New York.

== Upper pond ==
Fish species present in the lake are rainbow trout, black bullhead, white sucker, lake trout, lake whitefish, brook trout, and sunfish. There is carry down access off CR-8 on the east shore. No motors are allowed on this lake.

== Lower pond ==
Fish species present in the lake are rainbow trout, black bullhead, white sucker, lake trout, lake whitefish, brook trout, and sunfish. There is carry down access off CR-8 on the east shore. No motors are allowed on this lake.
