= Kibbie =

Kibbie may refer to:

== Food ==
- Kibbeh, a dish of meat mixed with bulgur and spices, popular in the Middle East

== People ==
- Hod Kibbie (1903–1975), American baseball player
- Jack Kibbie (1929–2025), American politician, Iowa State Senator
- James Kibbie (born 1949), American concert organist, recording artist, and pedagogue

== Places ==
- Kibbie Dome, a multi-purpose indoor athletic stadium
- Kibbie Lake, a lake which lies in the Yosemite National Park in the USA
- Kibbie, Illinois
- Kibbie, Michigan

== See also ==
- Kibbee, a list of people with the surname
- Kibby (disambiguation)
- Kibbe (surname)
