= Upper Fish Pond =

- Location within New York Location within the United States
- Location: Warren County, New York, United States
- Coordinates: 43.3245°N 74.0350°W
- Type: Lake
- Basin countries: United States
- Surface area: 18 acres (0.073 km^{2})
- Max. depth: 14 feet (4.3 m)
- Shore length^{1}: .9 miles (1.4 km)
- Surface elevation: 1,594 feet (486 m)
- Settlements: Oregon, New York
- ^{1} Shore length is not a well-defined measure.

Upper Fish Pond is located southeast of Oregon, New York. Fish species present in the lake are pickerel, white sucker, sunfish, and brown bullhead. There is a trail along the east shore.
