= Lower Fish Pond =

- Location within New York Location within the United States
- Location: Warren County, New York, United States
- Coordinates: 43.3215°N 74.0419°W
- Type: Lake
- Basin countries: United States
- Surface area: 20 acres (0.081 km^{2})
- Max. depth: 15 feet (4.6 m)
- Shore length^{1}: 1.1 miles (1.8 km)
- Surface elevation: 1,588 feet (484 m)
- Settlements: Oregon, New York
- ^{1} Shore length is not a well-defined measure.

Lower Fish Pond is located southeast of Oregon, New York. Fish species present in the lake are pickerel, white sucker, sunfish, and brown bullhead. There is a trail along the eastern shore.
