= New York State Route 32B =

State highway in the Capital District region of New York, in the United States

New York State Route 32B
- Map of Glens Falls with NY 32B highlighted in red (Section replaced by NY 911E backed in blue)

Route information
- Auxiliary route of NY 32
- Maintained by New York State Department of Public Works
- Length: 1.53 mi (2.46 km)
- Existed: 1930–c. 1965

Major junctions
- West end: NY 32 in Queensbury
- East end: US 4 in Hudson Falls

Location
- Country: United States
- State: New York
- Counties: Warren, Washington

Highway system
- New York Highways; Interstate; US; State; Reference; Parkways
← NY 32A	→ NY 33

New York State Route 32B (NY 32B) was a state highway in the Capital District region of New York, in the United States. The western terminus of the route was at an intersection with NY 32 in Queensbury. Its eastern terminus was at a junction with U.S. Route 4 (US 4) in Hudson Falls. NY 32B, named Warren Street in Queensbury and River Street in Hudson Falls, ran along the banks of the Hudson River as it went from Glens Falls to Hudson Falls. It crossed over the Glens Falls Feeder Canal near its junction with NY 32 in Queensbury.

When NY 32B was assigned as part of the 1930 renumbering of state highways in New York, it began at an intersection with US 4 and NY 32 in Northumberland and ended at US 9 in Glens Falls. The portion of the route between Northumberland and Hudson Falls was concurrent with US 4 upon assignment while the segment west of Boulevard in Queensbury became concurrent with NY 32 in 1949. NY 32B was truncated north to Hudson Falls in the early 1940s and east to Boulevard c. 1962. The route was partially replaced with NY 254 c. 1965.

== Route description ==
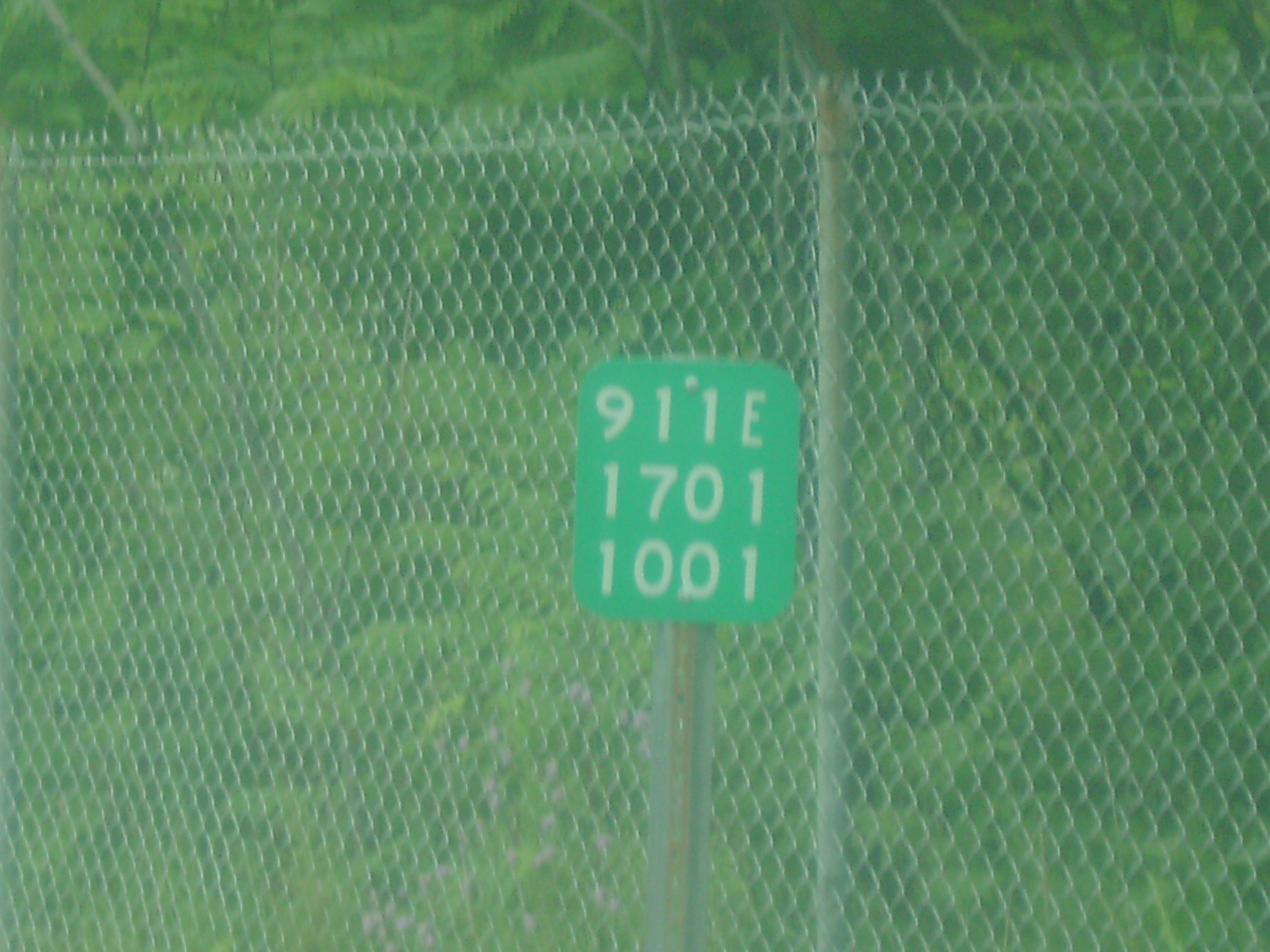
The lone reference marker on NY 911E, part of former NY 32B

NY 32B, as routed at the time of its removal, began at the intersection of Boulevard (then-NY 32), Warren Street (NY 32 west of Boulevard), and Highland Avenue east of Glens Falls in the Warren County town of Queensbury. The route headed east along Warren Street (here named Lower Warren Street), paralleling the eastern bank of the Hudson River. It crossed over the Glens Falls Feeder Canal prior to reaching the Warren–Washington county line. Here, Warren Street turns north to straddle the county line; however, NY 32B continued southeastward into Hudson Falls on River Street. NY 32B ended five blocks later at a junction with US 4 in downtown Hudson Falls.

== History ==
In 1924, Warren Street in Glens Falls and River Street in Hudson Falls became part of NY 30, a highway that initially extended from Mechanicville to the Vermont state line near Fair Haven by way of Glens Falls and Whitehall. It was realigned by 1926 to continue north from Whitehall toward the Canadian border. In 1926, the portion of NY 30 between Glens Falls and Whitehall was included in the new US 4, which began in Glens Falls and continued east from Whitehall into Vermont by way of NY 30's former routing. It was rerouted to follow its modern alignment south of Hudson Falls as part of the 1930 renumbering of state highways in New York. US 4's former routing between Glens Falls and Hudson Falls became part of NY 32B, a new route assigned in the renumbering that continued south to NY 32 in Northumberland by way of an overlap with US 4.

NY 32B was gradually truncated as time went on. In the early 1940s, NY 32B was cut back on its east end to its junction with US 4 in Hudson Falls, eliminating its lengthy overlap with US 4 along the Hudson River. The route would have been severed from its parent, NY 32, as a result; however, NY 32 was extended northeastward along US 9 from South Glens Falls to NY 32B in Glens Falls by this time. On January 1, 1949, NY 32 was extended east to US 4 in Hudson Falls by way of Warren Street, Boulevard, and Feeder Street. The resulting overlap between NY 32 and NY 32B along Warren Street from downtown Glens Falls to Boulevard remained in place until c. 1962 when NY 32B was truncated on its western end to the eastern terminus of the overlap.

NY 32B ceased to exist altogether c. 1965 when the portion of NY 32B east of the newly constructed Quaker Road was incorporated into the new NY 254. The segment of former NY 32B that did not become part of NY 254—located on Lower Warren Street in Queensbury—is now NY 911E, an unsigned reference route 0.20 miles (0.32 km) in length. It is one of three reference routes in Warren County. The NY 656 designation is reserved by the New York State Department of Transportation as a signed replacement for NY 911E; however, there is no timetable for its assignment.

== Major intersections ==
County	Location	mi	km	Destinations	Notes
Warren	Queensbury	0.00	0.00	NY 32	
Washington	Hudson Falls	1.53	2.46	US 4	
1.000 mi = 1.609 km; 1.000 km = 0.621 mi

== See also ==
- List of highways in Warren County, New York
