= New York State Route 254 =

New York state highway

New York State Route 254
- Map of the Glens Falls area with NY 254 highlighted in red

Route information
- Maintained by NYSDOT and Warren County Department of Public Works
- Length: 6.01 mi (9.67 km)
- Existed: c. 1965–present

Major junctions
- West end: I-87 in Queensbury
- US 9 in Queensbury
- East end: US 4 in Hudson Falls

Location
- Country: United States
- State: New York
- Counties: Warren, Washington

Highway system
- New York Highways; Interstate; US; State; Reference; Parkways
← NY 253	→ NY 255

New York State Route 254 (NY 254) is a state highway that extends for 6.01 miles (9.67 km) through Warren and Washington counties in the Capital District of New York in the United States. The route runs from exit 19 along the Adirondack Northway (Interstate 87 or I-87) in Queensbury and follows Aviation Road, Quaker Road, and Lower Warren Street through Queensbury to Hudson Falls, where it terminates at an intersection with U.S. Route 4 (US 4) in the center of the village.

The portion of NY 254 along Lower Warren Street and River Street has had several designations over the years. From 1924 to 1930, it was part of the original NY 30. In 1927, it also became part of US 4, which initially overlapped NY 30 from Glens Falls to Whitehall. In the 1930 renumbering of state highways in New York, NY 30 was reassigned elsewhere while US 4 was rerouted to bypass Glens Falls to the east. As a result, Lower Warren Street and River Street became part of NY 32B.

The NY 32B designation remained in place until the mid-1960s when the Quaker Road arterial was built. NY 32B was partially replaced c. 1965 by NY 254, the designation assigned to the new highway around Glens Falls. The portion of NY 254 between US 9 and Lower Warren Street is maintained by Warren County and co-designated as County Route 47 (CR 47) and CR 70.

== Route description ==
NY 254 begins at the southbound ramp of Adirondack Northway (I-87) exit 19 north of Glens Falls in the town of Queensbury. The route heads eastward from the interchange as Aviation Road, passing by many commercial buildings and Aviation Mall. As it passes along the north side of the mall, NY 254 curves to the southeast before veering back to the northeast ahead of an intersection with the four-lane US 9 (Upper Glen Street). The route continues past US 9; however, maintenance of the highway is transferred from the New York State Department of Transportation (NYSDOT) to Warren County at the US 9 junction. Now co-designated as CR 47, NY 254 progresses eastward along the four-lane Quaker Road, serving as a northerly bypass of the city of Glens Falls.

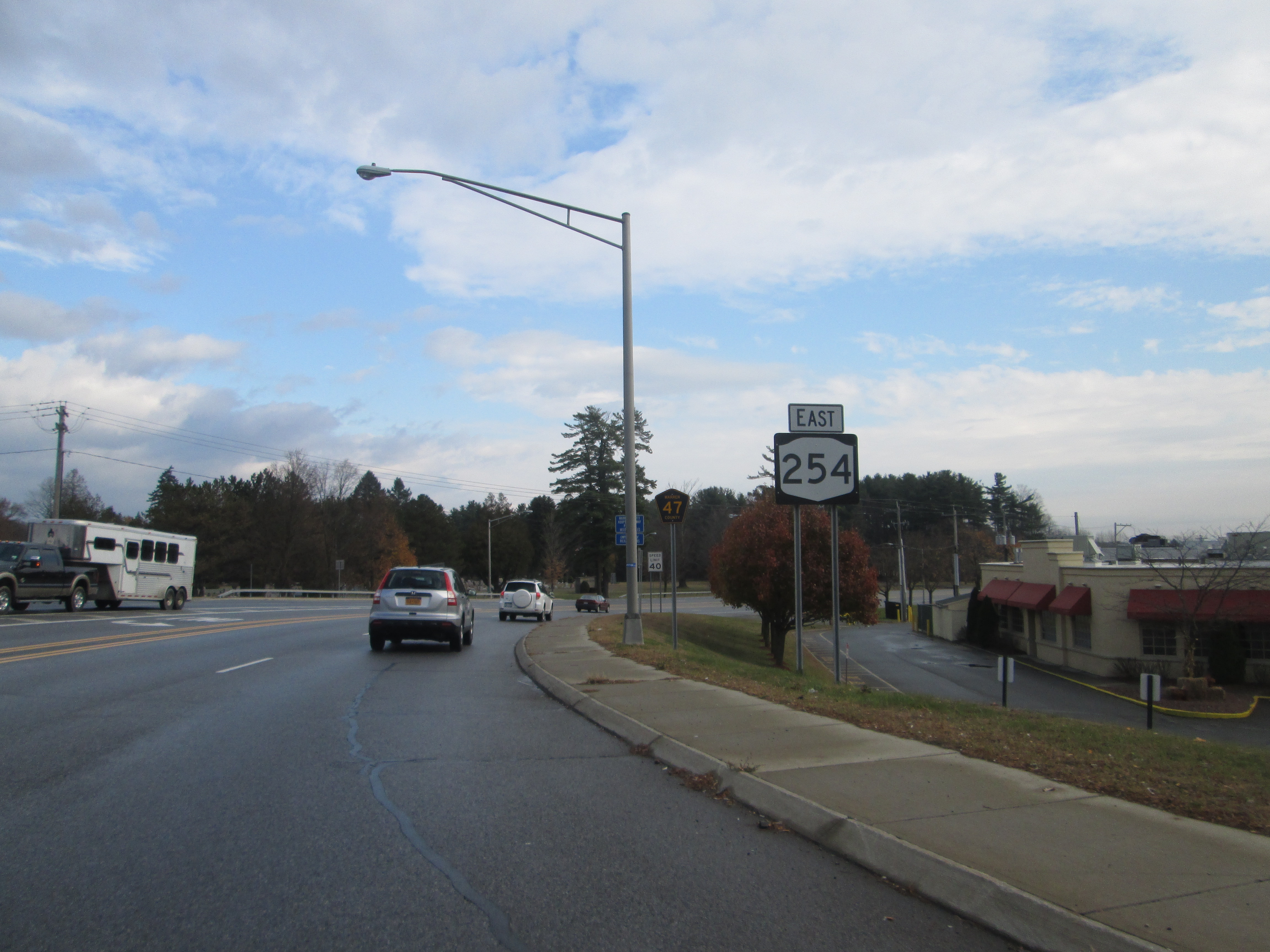
NY 254 eastbound after the junction with US 9 in Queensbury in 2013 after CR 47 shields were added alongside

As the route heads east, it passes Pine View Cemetery and several local businesses. At an intersection with Glenwood Avenue (CR 34), the county's internal designation for NY 254 becomes CR 70, whereafter the route passes over Halfway Brook and under the Gerald B. Solomon Bikeway Bridge – a part of the Warren County Bikeway. The highway progresses southeasterly upon intersecting NY 9L as NY 254 turns due southeast to avoid Floyd Bennett Memorial Airport. Along this stretch, NY 254 heads through undeveloped land before entering another area of commercial development as it approaches the outskirts of Hudson Falls. Here, the route meets NY 32 at Highland Avenue before intersecting Lower Warren Street (here unsigned NY 911E) on the banks of the Hudson River.

NY 254 turns east at NY 911E, becoming state maintained once more as it follows Lower Warren Street across the Glens Falls Feeder Canal and along the Hudson River into Washington County and the village of Hudson Falls. As River Street, NY 254 heads to the southeast for a short distance before terminating at an intersection with US 4 in downtown Hudson Falls. NY 196 begins one block to the south of this junction.

== History ==
Prior to the 1930s, the NY 254 designation was used for a portion of highway running between Bristol and Lakeville. This portion was later redesignated U.S. Route 20A

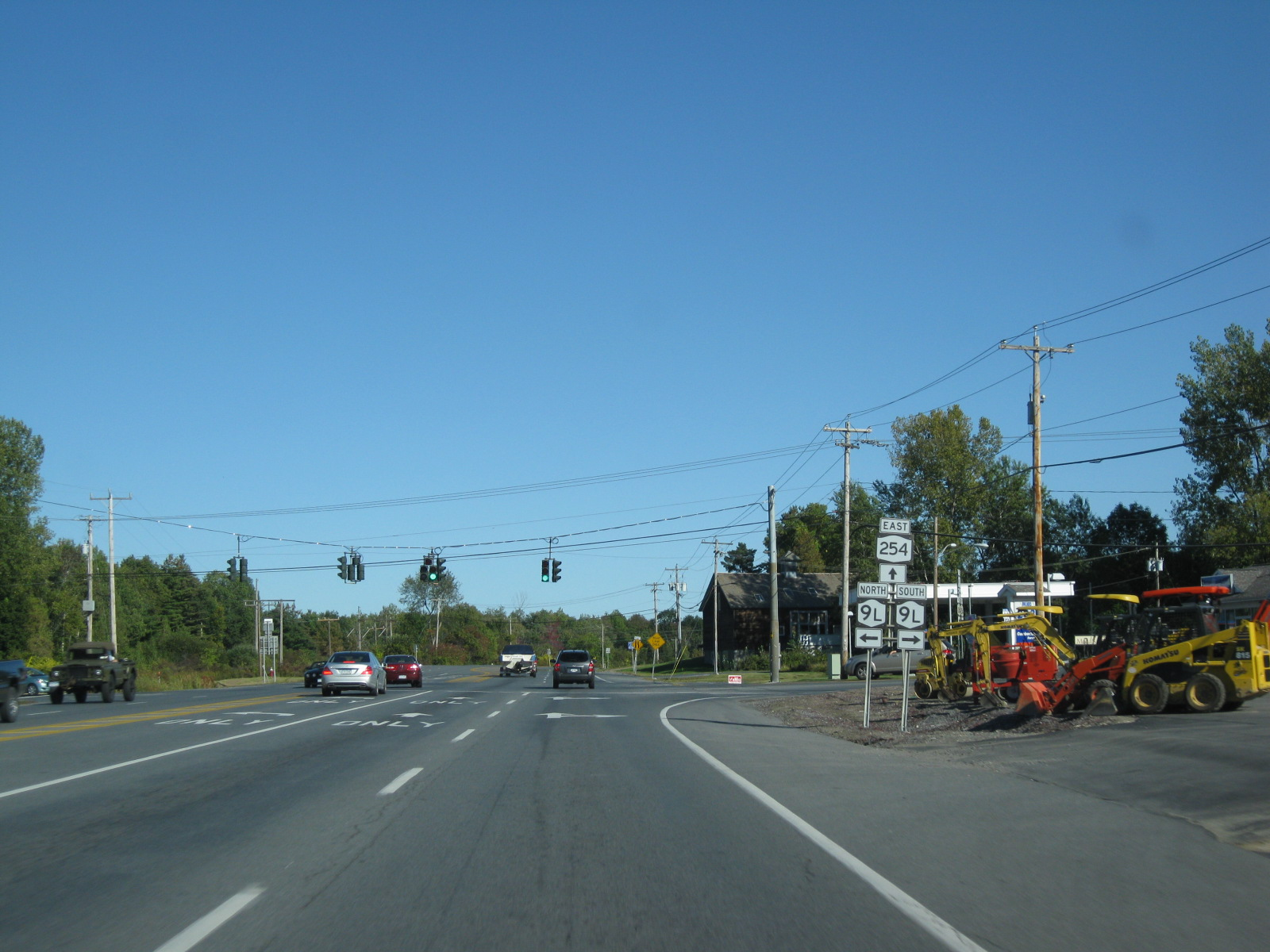
NY 254 eastbound at the junction with NY 9L in Queensbury

Warren Street in Glens Falls, Lower Warren Street in Queensbury, and River Street in Hudson Falls were originally designated as part of NY 30 in 1924. In late 1926, the U.S. Highway System was created. One of the routes assigned at this time was US 4, which overlapped NY 30 between Glens Falls and Whitehall. In the 1930 renumbering of state highways in New York, the NY 30 designation was reassigned elsewhere while US 4 was reconfigured to continue south from Hudson Falls to East Greenbush. The former routing of US 4 into Glens Falls became part of NY 32B, an alternate route of NY 32 that followed the Hudson River between Schuylerville and Glens Falls. All of NY 32B south of Hudson Falls was concurrent to US 4.

NY 32B was truncated over time, eventually consisting of just the portion between Boulevard (then-NY 32) in Queensbury and US 4 in Hudson Falls. In the mid-1960s, a new arterial was constructed around the northern and eastern extents of Glens Falls. The roadway, designated as NY 254 c. 1965, extended from I-87 in the north to Warren Street (NY 32B) in the south. NY 254 then continued east to US 4 in Hudson Falls, replacing NY 32B. The short 0.20-mile (0.32 km) segment of Warren Street between NY 32 and NY 254, formerly the westernmost portion of NY 32B, is now NY 911E, an unsigned reference route.

== Major intersections ==
County	Location	mi	km	Destinations	Notes
Warren	Queensbury	0.00	0.00	I-87	Western terminus; exit 19 on I-87 / Northway
Warren	Queensbury	0.74	1.19	US 9 – Lake George, Glens Falls	
Warren	Queensbury	2.59	4.17	NY 9L (Ridge Road)	
Warren	Queensbury	4.46	7.18	NY 32 – Glens Falls	
Warren	Queensbury	4.66	7.50	Lower Warren Street ( NY 911E)	Eastern terminus of unsigned NY 911E; former routing of NY 32B
Washington	Hudson Falls	6.01	9.67	US 4 (Main Street) to NY 196	Eastern terminus; traffic circle
1.000 mi = 1.609 km; 1.000 km = 0.621 mi
