= Kibbe (surname) =

Kibbe is the surname of:

- Alice L. Kibbe (1881–1969), American botanist and professor of biology
- Matt Kibbe, American political activist
- Roger Kibbe (1939–2021), American serial killer known as the "I-5 Strangler"
- Trudie Kibbe Reed, American academic administrator
- William Chauncey Kibbe (1822–1904), California pioneer and third Adjutant General of California

== See also ==
- Kibbee, a list of people with the surname
- Kibbie (disambiguation)
