= New York State Route 9M =

Former state highway in Warren County, New York, in the United States

New York State Route 9M
- Map of northern Warren County with NY 9M highlighted in red

Route information
- Auxiliary route of US 9
- Maintained by State of New York Department of Public Works
- Length: 4.72 mi (7.60 km)
- Existed: c. 1931–c. 1939

Major junctions
- South end: NY 8 in Horicon
- North end: US 9 in Chester

Location
- Country: United States
- State: New York
- Counties: Warren

Highway system
- New York Highways; Interstate; US; State; Reference; Parkways
| ← NY 9L | → NY 9N |

New York State Route 9M (NY 9M) was a state highway in Warren County, New York, in the United States. It was a spur route of U.S. Route 9 (US 9) that largely followed the eastern bank of the Schroon River. The southern terminus of the route was at NY 8 in the town of Horicon near the hamlet of Starbuckville. Its northern terminus was at US 9 in the Chester hamlet of Pottersville. NY 9M was known as East Schroon River Road and Glendale Road and crossed over the southern tip of Schroon Lake.

NY 9M was assigned c. 1931 to what had been designated as legislative Route 22-c from 1913 to 1921. It lasted for less than a decade as it was removed c. 1939. Its former routing is now maintained by Warren County as part of three county routes, namely County Route 55 (CR 55), CR 62, and County Route 64.

== Route description ==
NY 9M began at an intersection with NY 8 (now CR 53) north of the hamlet of Starbuckville in the town of Horicon. The route followed Valentine Pond Road north for a negligible distance, then progressed westward along the eastern bank of the Schroon River on East Schroon River Road. Across the river, Carl Turner Road, a locally maintained highway, followed a routing parallel to that of NY 9M on the other shore. Both roads gradually curved northward, mirroring a similar turn in the river's course. Carl Turner Road came to an end here; however, NY 9M continued on. Near a junction with modern-day Short Street, NY 9M began to deviate from the river.

North of Short Street, NY 9M curved back to the northwest, passing Smith Pond and traveling through woodlands as it approached Schroon Lake. It then crossed over the southern tip of the lake and entered the town of Chester on the opposite bank. The route came to an end shortly afterward at a junction with US 9 in the hamlet of Pottersville.

== History ==
In 1913, the New York State Legislature created Route 22-c, an unsigned legislative route extending 4.80 miles (7.72 km) from State Highway 1023 (later NY 8 and now CR 53) near Starbuckville to legislative Route 22 (modern US 9) in Pottersville. The Route 22-c designation was eliminated on March 1, 1921, as part of a partial renumbering of New York's legislative route system. In the 1930 renumbering of state highways in New York, hundreds of state-maintained highways that did not have a signed designation were assigned one. The former routing of legislative Route 22-c was designated as NY 9M by the following year. NY 9M was short-lived, however, as it ceased to exist c. 1939. Its former routing is now maintained by Warren County as CR 55 from former NY 8 (CR 53) to East Schroon River Road, CR 64 from Valentine Pond Road to East Shore Road, and CR 62 from East Shore Road to US 9.

== Major intersections ==
The entire route was in Warren County.

| Location | mi | km | Destinations | Notes |
|---|---|---|---|---|
| Starbuckville | 0.00 | 0.00 | NY 8 | Now CR 53 |
| Pottersville | 4.72 | 7.60 | US 9 | |
1.000 mi = 1.609 km; 1.000 km = 0.621 mi
