= New York State Route 9L =

State highway in Warren County, New York, in the United States

New York State Route 9L
- Map of Glens Falls and vicinity with NY 9L highlighted in red

Route information
- Auxiliary route of US 9
- Maintained by NYSDOT and the city of Glens Falls
- Length: 18.51 mi (29.79 km)
- Existed: 1930–present

Major junctions
- South end: US 9 / NY 32 in Glens Falls
- NY 254 in Queensbury; NY 149 in Queensbury
- North end: US 9 / NY 9N in Lake George

Location
- Country: United States
- State: New York
- Counties: Warren

Highway system
- New York Highways; Interstate; US; State; Reference; Parkways
← NY 9K	→ NY 9M

New York State Route 9L (NY 9L) is a state highway in Warren County, New York, in the United States. The road is 18.58 miles (29.90 km) long and is a suffixed highway of U.S. Route 9 (US 9). NY 9L goes through three municipalities in Warren County: the city of Glens Falls, the town of Queensbury and the town of Lake George. It starts at an intersection with US 9 and NY 32 in Glens Falls and ends at a junction with US 9 and NY 9N in Lake George. NY 9L is a scenic route for people traveling to Lake George as the road provides many views of the lake. The route was assigned as part of the 1930 renumbering of state highways in New York along the path of an old military road originally built during the American Revolution.

== Route description ==
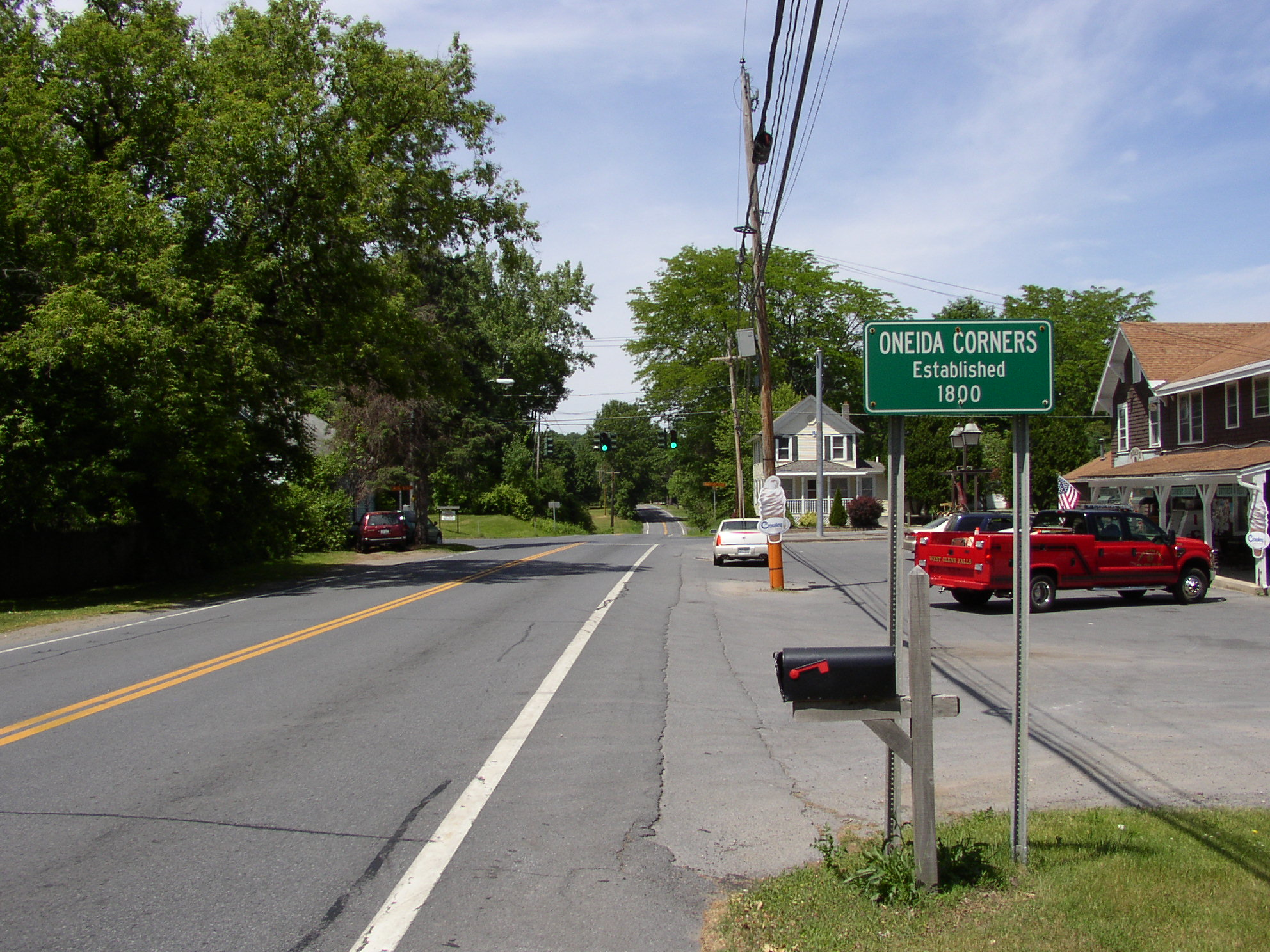
NY 9L northbound at the hamlet of Oneida Corners in the town of Queensbury

NY 9L begins at an intersection with US 9 and NY 32 in downtown Glens Falls where it is called Ridge St. It heads north, intersecting with local roads as it exits the city and enters the town of Queensbury. At the city line, maintenance of the route shifts from the city of Glens Falls to the New York State Department of Transportation (NYSDOT). Just north of the city limits, NY 9L intersects NY 254 which is called Quaker Road. The route continues as Ridge Road northward through Queensbury, passing Floyd Bennett Memorial Airport and running parallel to the Washington County line on its way toward and eventually across the Blue Line into Adirondack Park. NY 9L intersects NY 149, an east–west arterial connecting Interstate 87 (I-87) to Vermont, just north of the park limits.

The route continues into Brayton, a hamlet situated in northeast Queensbury. At a junction 11.3 miles (18.2 km) northeast of Glens Falls and 1 mile (1.6 km) north of Brayton, NY 9L meets Pilot Knob Road (County Route 38 or CR 38), a local roadway serving several communities located on the eastern shores of Lake George and along the base of Pilot Knob. NY 9L turns southwest here, roughly paralleling the east shore of Lake George. A mile west of Brayton, NY 9L intersects with Cleverdale Road, a road serving the small island hamlet of Cleverdale. Just afterward, it passes an open area called Joshua's Rock, with a cluster of buildings. This is Owl's Nest, the home of early realist novelist Edward Eggleston, a designated National Historic Landmark.

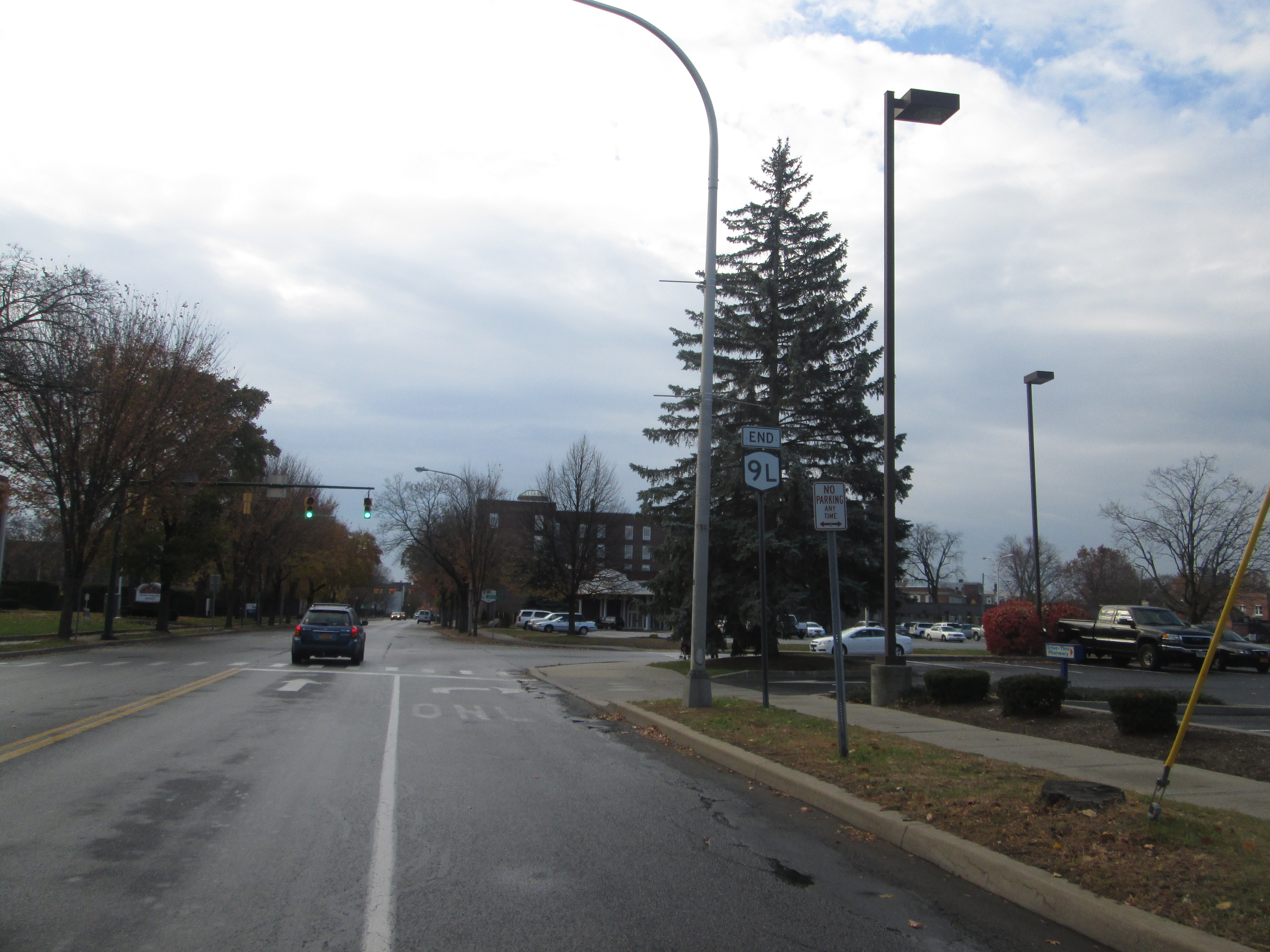
NY 9L in Glens Falls with a missigned terminus as NY 9L terminates further up

After passing the community of Rockhurst, the route intersects Assembly Point Road, another local road serving a minor peninsula and Assembly Point on its tip. Past this point, NY 9L tightly parallels the southeast shore of Lake George heading southwest into the town of Lake George. The route comes to an end at a junction with US 9 and NY 9N south of the village of Lake George.

== History ==
Modern NY 9L follows the length of the Old Military Road, which was the first road to connect to what is now the town of Queensbury. It was first built in 1755 as the Colonial Army headed north from Albany. The construction of the road helped to increase development in the town. In 1832, the Glens Falls Feeder Canal opened, further improving transportation in Queensbury. Sixteen years later, in 1848, a plank road was built over the old Military Road.

NY 9L was assigned as part of the 1930 renumbering of state highways in New York to its current alignment. The bridge carrying NY 9L over Halfway Creek in Queensbury was originally built in 1923. On August 27, 2007, the New York State Department of Transportation announced that the bridge would be replaced at a cost of $1.3 million. Initially, work on the project was to begin in September of that year; however, the start of construction was delayed until April 21, 2008. The new bridge was completed in September.

== Major intersections ==
The entire route is in Warren County.

Location	mi	km	Destinations	Notes
Glens Falls	0.00	0.00	US 9 / NY 32 to I-87	Southern terminus
Queensbury	1.58	2.54	NY 254 to US 9 – Hudson Falls	
Queensbury	6.73	10.83	NY 149 – Fort Ann	
Town of Lake George	18.58	29.90	US 9 / NY 9N to I-87 – Glens Falls, Lake Luzerne, Lake George	Northern terminus
1.000 mi = 1.609 km; 1.000 km = 0.621 mi
