= Kibby Pond =

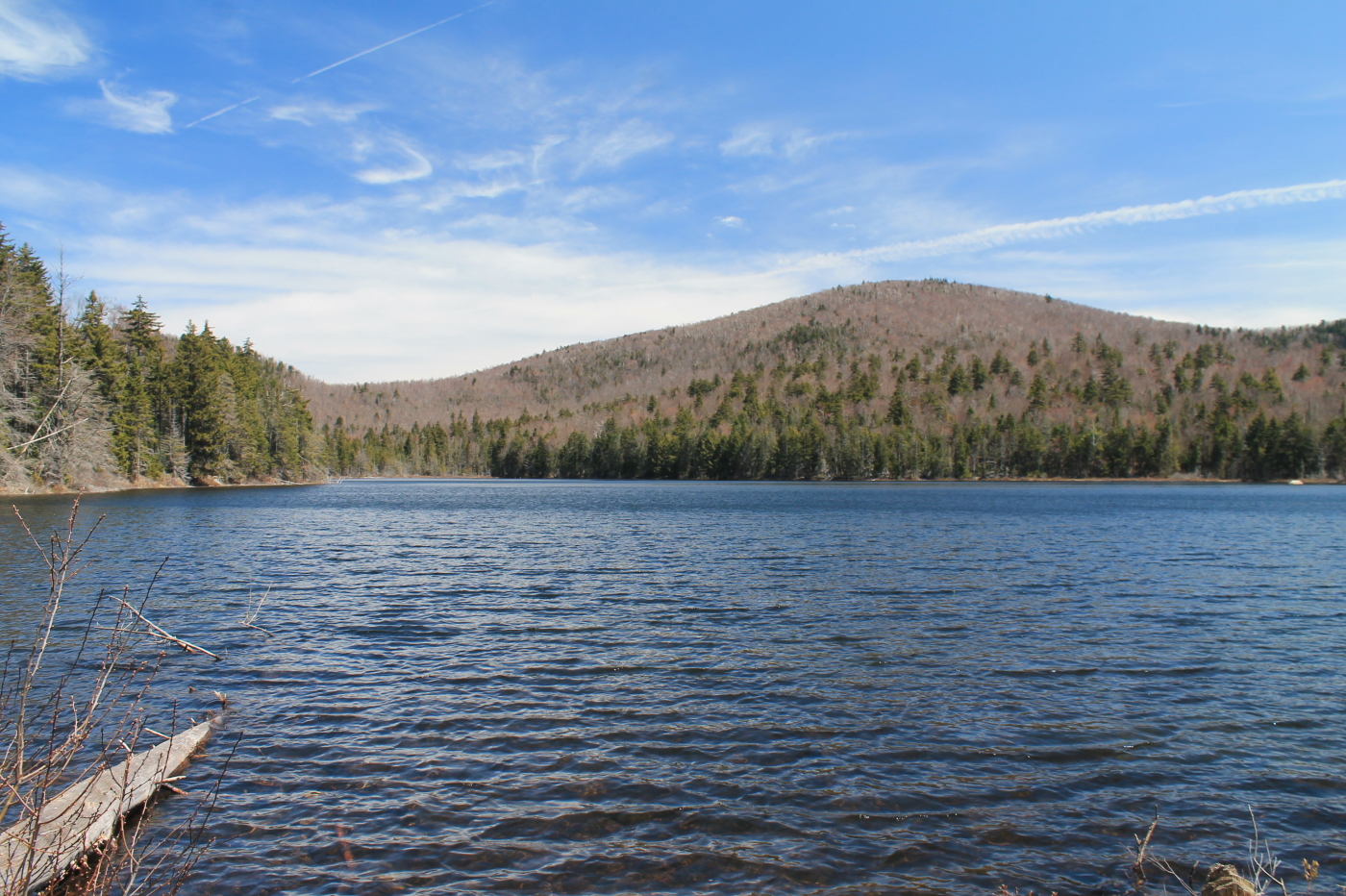
- Kibby Pond in 2014

- Location within New York Location within the United States
- Location: Warren County, New York, United States
- Coordinates: 43°34′23″N 74°04′47″W
- Type: Lake
- Primary outflows: Kibby Brook
- Basin countries: United States
- Surface area: 41 acres (0.17 km^{2})
- Max. depth: 36 feet (11 m)
- Shore length^{1}: 1.3 miles (2.1 km)
- Surface elevation: 2,093 feet (638 m)
- Settlements: Bakers Mills, New York
- ^{1} Shore length is not a well-defined measure.

Kibby Pond is located southeast of Bakers Mills, New York. The pond is within the boundaries of Adirondack Park. Fish species present in the lake are tiger trout, brook trout, and brown bullhead. There is a 2 mile trail off CR-8 to the west shore.
