= Thirteenth Brook =

Location
- Country: United States
- State: New York

Physical characteristics
- Source: Thirteenth Lake
  - location: Warren County, New York
- Mouth: Hudson River
  - location: North River, Warren County, New York, United States
  - coordinates: 43°44′39″N 74°03′30″W

Thirteenth Brook drains Thirteenth Lake and empties into the Hudson River by North River, New York.
