= List of highways in Warren County, New York =

- Map of Warren County's highway system

Highway names
- Interstates: Interstate X (I-X)
- US Highways: U.S. Route X (US X)
- State: New York State Route X (NY X)
- County: County Route X (CR X)

System links
- New York Highways; Interstate; US; State; Reference; Parkways

The highway system of Warren County, New York, comprises 1,248.6 miles (2,009.4 km) of roads maintained by the New York State Department of Transportation, the county, and its towns and villages. Fourteen state-maintained highways enter the county, which account for a combined 219.4 miles (353.1 km) of the state highway mileage in New York. The state roads are supplemented by 245.3 miles (394.8 km) of county-maintained highways. Most roads within the county are short connectors, while others are sections of 30-mile (48 km) long highways. Warren County is served by one Interstate Highway, I-87, also known as the Adirondack Northway; one United States Numbered Highway, US 9; eight state-numbered signed touring routes; three state-maintained reference routes, all of which are unsigned; and 81 county-maintained routes, most of which are short connectors between more major roads.

The longest state route within the county is NY 9N, which runs for 48.58 miles (78.18 km) within Warren County. The shortest state-maintained route is NY 911E, a 0.2-mile (0.32 km) reference route just east of the city of Glens Falls. The state highways in Warren County serve many of the county's major municipalities, including Glens Falls, the towns of Warrensburg and Queensbury, and the village of Lake George.

== Highways ==
=== Interstate and US Highways ===
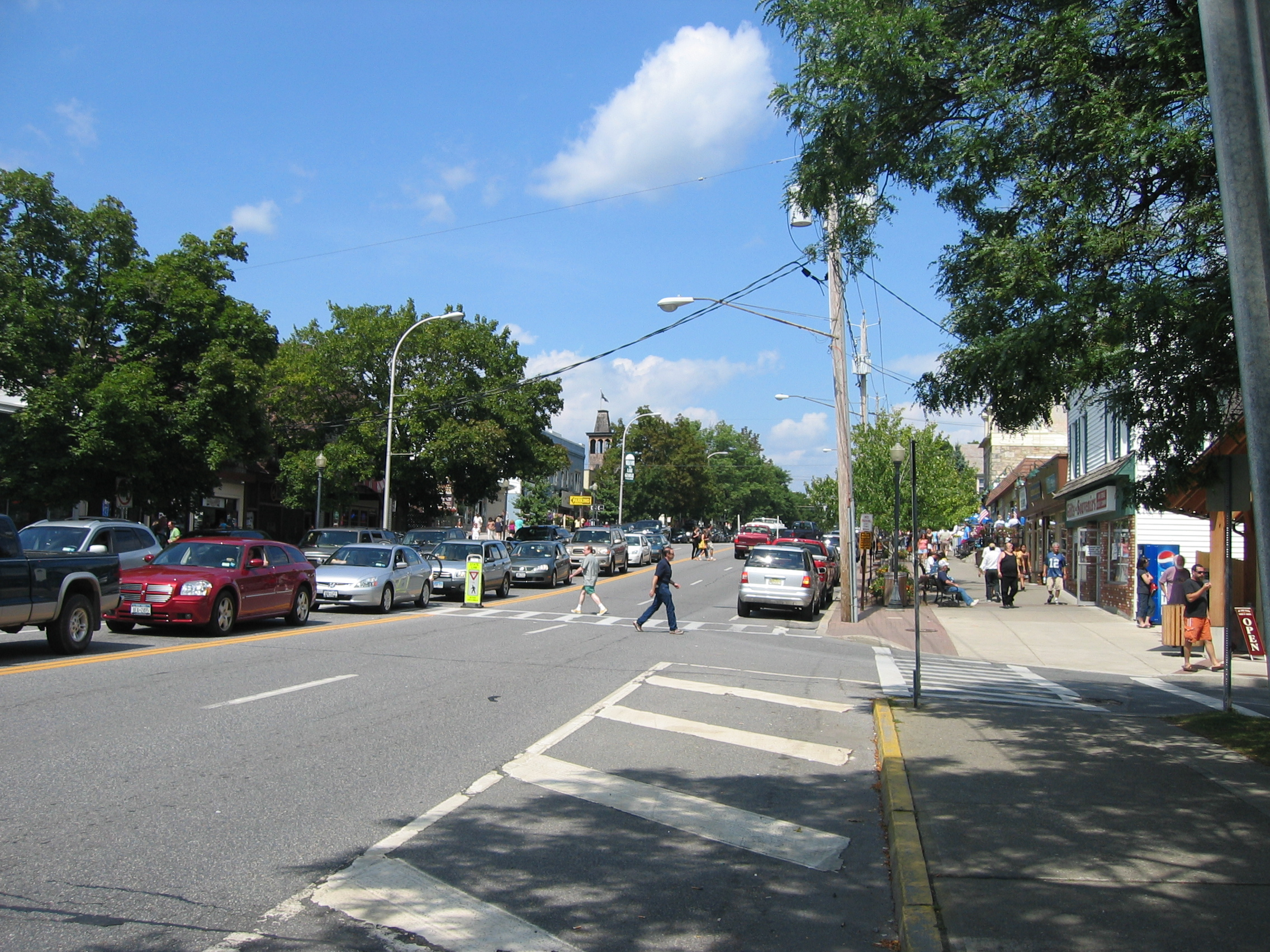
The busy downtown of Lake George Village along Canada Street (US 9 / NY 9N)

I-87 is the only Interstate Highway that enters Warren County. It travels for 38.53 miles (62.01 km) within the county and has nine interchanges along the way. Exits off the highway serve Glens Falls, Queensbury, Warrensburg, Lake George, Bolton Landing, and Chestertown. The highway once terminated in downtown Lake George, with its former two-lane end becoming NY 912Q after the highway was extended northward.

There have been two U.S. Highways in Warren County. The longest—and the only current one—is US 9, which spans for over 40.43 miles (65.07 km) within the county. Since its designation in 1926, US 9 services the city of Glens Falls, Queensbury, the village of Lake George, Warrensburg and Chestertown before leaving for Essex County. US 9 once had four suffixed routes in the county; however, only two still exist. Also assigned in 1926 was US 4, which initially terminated in Glens Falls at US 9. It was realigned as part of the 1930 renumbering of state highways in New York to follow the Hudson River south from Hudson Falls to the Capital District, bypassing Warren County to the east.

=== State touring routes and scenic byways ===
Touring routes are signed with black and white route markers, and small, green reference markers are posted along the state-maintained sections of the routes. There have been 18 state signed touring routes in Warren County since the modern state touring system was established in 1924; however, only 10 of them remain. Three routes created in 1924—NY 6, NY 10, and NY 30—entered the Warren County limits, crossing the county in a north–south manner. Another route, NY 47, was assigned by 1926 to an alignment extending from Chestertown to Ticonderoga via Hague. NY 6 was replaced by US 9 in 1927, and the three other routes were realigned out of the county or eliminated as part of the 1930 renumbering.

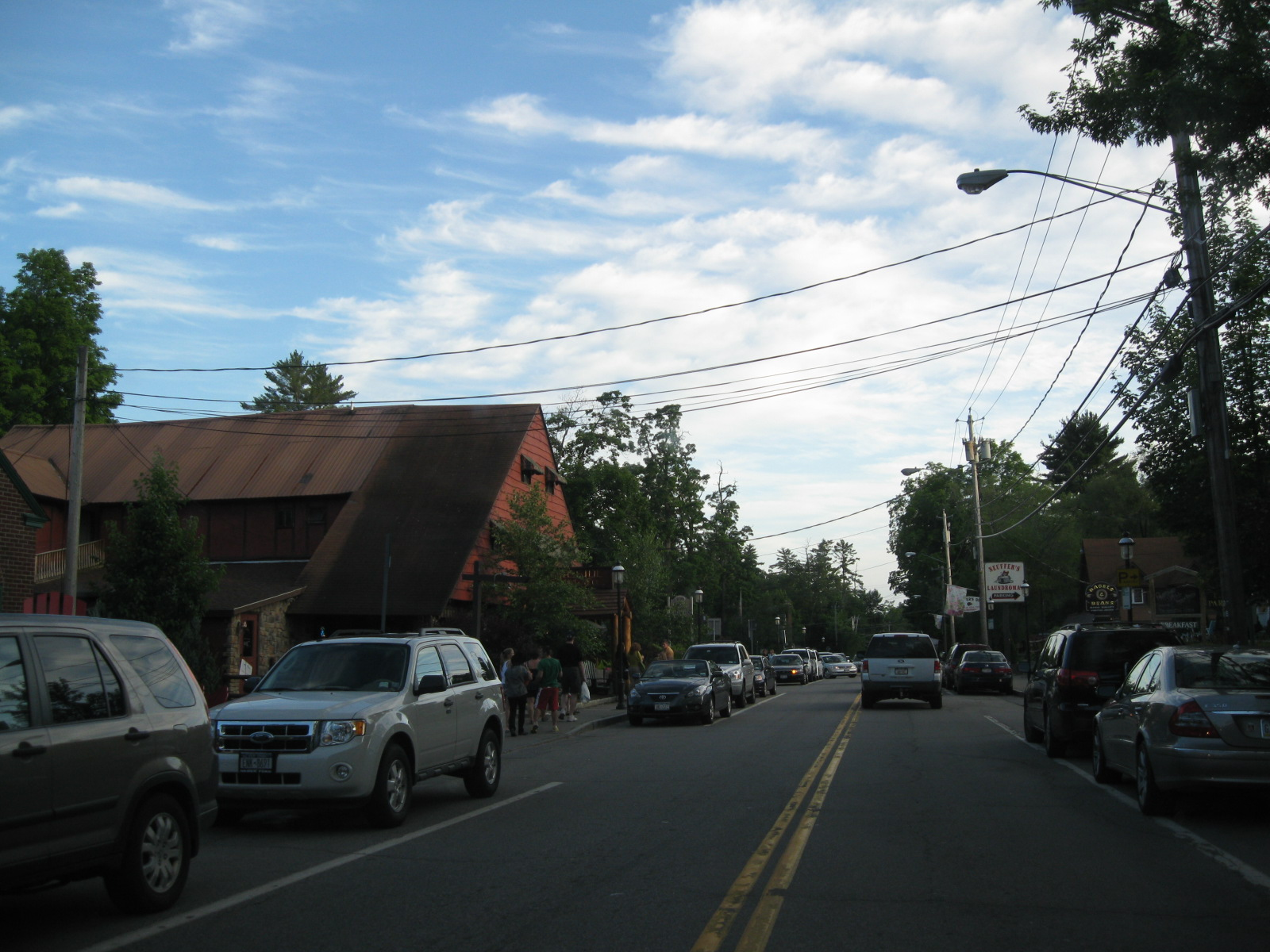
NY 9N passes through the thriving downtown of Bolton Landing

The post-renumbering state route system in Warren County was identical to the current route layout, save for a handful of routes. In the 1930 renumbering, NY 9K was assigned to NY 10's former routing between Saratoga Springs and Lake George while NY 47 was reassigned to a highway between Lake George village and Hague that ran along the western shore of Lake George. NY 9N, meanwhile, initially began in Elizabethtown, Essex County. That route was extended south twice: first to Lake George c. 1936, replacing NY 47; and again to Saratoga Springs in the early 1950s, supplanting NY 9K. Also assigned in the renumbering was NY 32B, an alternate route of NY 32 that began in Glens Falls and followed the Hudson River east into Washington County. NY 9M, a north–south spur connecting US 9 to NY 8, was assigned by the following year, but eliminated c. 1939.

By 1940, NY 32 was extended into Warren County, passing through Glens Falls and Queensbury on its way to a terminus in Washington County. NY 32B initially overlapped with NY 32 along Warren Street; however, it was truncated eastward to begin in Queensbury c. 1962 and eliminated c. 1965. It was partially replaced by NY 254, a northeasterly bypass of Glens Falls from I-87 to Washington County.

Of the 10 current routes, NY 418 in Warrensburg is the shortest while NY 9N is the longest. Other active routes in Warren County include NY 8, which spans the northern part of the county; NY 9L, a short suffixed route of US 9; NY 149, a connector from I-87 to the Vermont border in Warren and nearby Washington Counties; NY 28, which serves western Warren County and terminates in Johnsburg; and its suffixed route, NY 28N, which ends in the western part of the county.

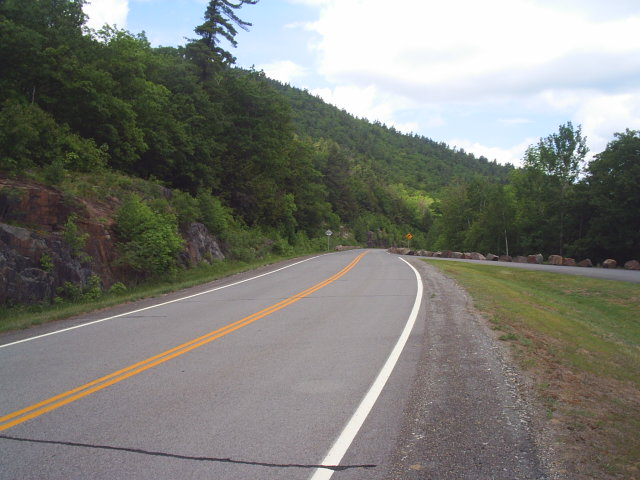
Prospect Mountain Veterans Memorial Highway at one of the three scenic overlooks on the mountainside

There are 13 New York State Scenic Byways in the Adirondacks alone, three of them in Warren County. The first is the Roosevelt–Marcy Trail, which runs on NY 28N. The second is the Dude Ranch Trail, a loop in Warren and nearby Saratoga counties, and the third is the Central Adirondack Trail, which utilizes parts of NY 9L, US 9 and NY 28.

=== State reference routes ===
There are three state-maintained reference routes in Warren County. A reference route is a road owned by the state but are signed only with reference markers. The shortest of these is NY 911E, an east–west highway connecting NY 32 to NY 254. The route is the only portion of NY 32B's former alignment in Warren County that did not become part of NY 254. Although it is the shortest reference route in the county, the New York State Department of Transportation has reserved NY 656, a replacement touring route designation, for the highway. A date for the renumbering has not been determined. The longest of Warren County's three reference routes is NY 917A, better known as the Prospect Mountain Veterans Memorial Highway. The final reference route is NY 912Q, a two lane freeway spur leading east from I-87 exit 22.

=== County routes ===
There are 81 county-maintained roads in Warren County. Most are short connectors between major roadways, although a few are former state roads. A few examples are CR 64 and CR 62, both of which were part of NY 9M during the 1930s, and CR 79, which was part of NY 32 until 1981. In some cases, a single county route designation has been assigned to several different highways. An example is CR 11, which begins at an intersection with CR 10 just east of the Northway (I-87) in Chestertown, but splits into two east of Riverbank. Until 2009, Warren County Routes were not signed like normal touring routes; instead, they were marked with tab-like signs mounted on the back of poles. There was one exception, as CR 23 was signed as a normal county route would.

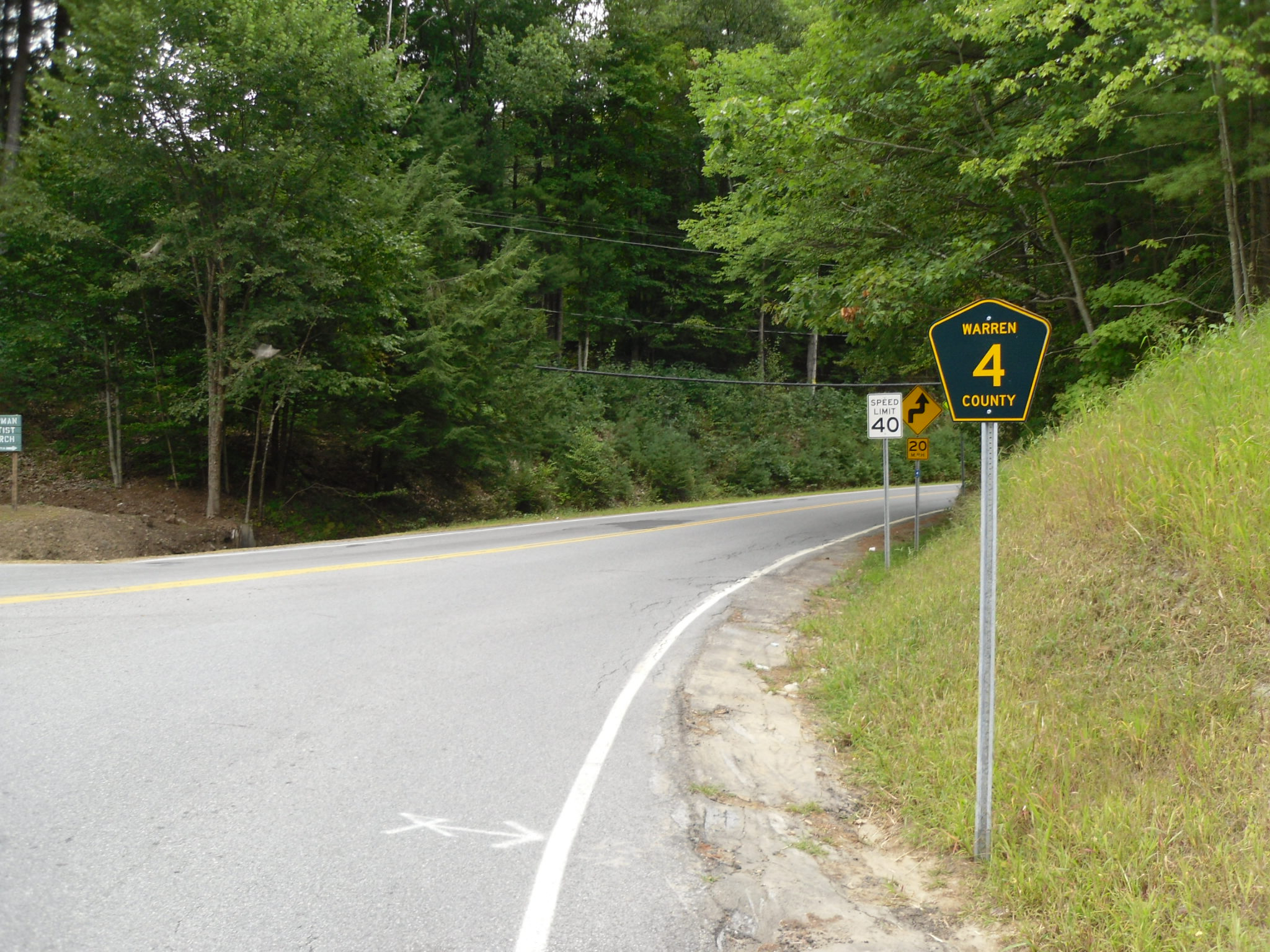
New county highway signage on CR 4 in Warrensburg. The old tab style can be seen affixed to the Speed Limit 40 sign in the background

In November 2007, locals of Warren County produced concern that the salt used on several county highways including CR 7, CR 11, and CR 35 was starting to harm the fragile environment of Lake George and the surrounding area. The Warren County Highway Department uses an average of 9,000 short tons (8,165 t) of salt on the roads around the Lake George area annually. The salt is beginning to flow into the lake, causing a harmful environmental impact. Since the amount of salt in Lake George has doubled since the 1980s, the highway department switched from using sand entirely to using salt for safety of drivers, rather than the environment. Local officials recognize the problem at hand and are trying to find ways to minimize salt usage.

In late 2009, Warren County DPW began adding the Manual on Uniform Traffic Control Devices-standard pentagon shield to their county roads. At first, signage was generally limited to the terminus of a single road, and roads were not signed at intersections with other county or state roads or when numbers change. By 2016, Warren County had placed signs at most, if not all, locations where numbers change, as well as some junction assemblies where routes intersect, such as on southbound CR 58 (West Mountain Road) approaching CR 28 (Corinth Road).

== List of Interstate, US, and state highways ==
The chart below shows current Interstate, U.S., and state highways by year of creation, length, and towns crossed. "Formed" displays the year or time period in which the route was assigned; "Length" shows the highway's total length in Warren County.

| Route | Formed | Length | | Towns crossed |
| Route | Formed | mi | km | Towns crossed |
|---|---|---|---|---|
| I-87 | 1957 | 38.53 | 62.01 | Queensbury, Lake George, Warrensburg, Chester |
| US 9 | 1926 | 40.43 | 65.07 | Glens Falls, Queensbury, Lake George, Warrensburg, Chester |
| NY 8 | 1930 | 46.79 | 75.30 | Chester, Johnsburg |
| NY 9L | 1930 | 18.58 | 29.90 | Queensbury, Lake George |
| NY 9N | 1930 | 48.58 | 78.18 | Lake Luzerne, Lake George, Bolton, Hague |
| NY 28 | 1930 | 21.23 | 34.17 | Chester, Warrensburg |
| NY 28N | 1930 | 4.54 | 7.31 | North Creek |
| NY 32 | 1930 | 2.88 | 4.63 | Glens Falls, Queensbury |
| NY 149 | 1930 | 5.90 | 9.50 | Queensbury |
| NY 254 | c. 1965 | 5.34 | 8.59 | Queensbury |
| NY 418 | 1930 | 3.50 | 5.63 | Warrensburg |
| NY 911E | — | 0.20 | 0.32 | Queensbury |
| NY 912Q | 1967 | 0.66 | 1.06 | Lake George |
| NY 917A | 1969 | 5.88 | 9.46 | Lake George |

== List of county routes ==
The chart below covers the county routes in Warren County. The county route system was established in February 1968. Route numbers, lengths, and termini were derived from the 2010 NYSDOT Warren County inventory unless otherwise noted.

| Route | Length (mi) | Length (km) | From | Via | To | Notes |
|---|---|---|---|---|---|---|
| CR 1 | | | 0.9 miles (1.4 km) south of NY 8 | Riverside Station Road in Johnsburg | NY 8 | Former number; now town-maintained |
| CR 2 | 2.73 | 4.39 | CR 3 at Stony Creek town line | Stony Creek Road in Thurman | CR 4 | |
| CR 3 | 6.53 | 10.51 | Becomes CR 22 0.27 miles (0.43 km) north of CR 76 | Harrisburg and Warrensburg Roads in Stony Creek | CR 2 at Thurman town line | |
| CR 4 | 7.82 | 12.59 | NY 418 | Stony Creek and Athol Roads, High Street, Mountain and Valley Roads in Thurman | CR 57 at Garnet Lake Road | |
| CR 5 | 0.27 | 0.43 | CR 9 | Fourth Avenue in Warrensburg | US 9 | |
| CR 6 (1) | 0.56 | 0.90 | US 9 | Fort George Road in Lake George | CR 51 | |
| CR 6 (2) | 0.19 | 0.31 | Lake George Beach State Park | Beach Road in Lake George | NY 9L | Unsigned |
| CR 7 | 8.42 | 13.55 | Glens Falls city line | Bay Road in Queensbury | NY 9L | |
| CR 8 | 6.69 | 10.77 | NY 28 | Friends Lake Road in Chester | US 9 / NY 8 | |
| CR 9 | 1.35 | 2.17 | CR 40 at Fish Hatchery Road | Hudson and Elm Streets in Warrensburg | NY 418 / CR 45 | |
| CR 10 | 11.07 | 17.82 | US 9 | Horicon Avenue and Schroon River Road in Warrensburg | CR 30 at Chester town line | |
| CR 11 (1) | 4.67 | 7.52 | CR 10 in Warrensburg | Bolton Landing–Riverbank Road | NY 9N in Bolton | |
| CR 11 (2) | 4.29 | 6.90 | CR 11 (segment 1) | Valley Woods Road in Bolton | NY 9N | |
| CR 12 | 3.02 | 4.86 | Saratoga County line (becomes CR 1) | Hadley Road in Stony Creek | CR 3 | |
| CR 13 | 6.26 | 10.07 | CR 4 | The Glen–Athol Road in Thurman | NY 28 | |
| CR 14 (1) | 0.38 | 0.61 | CR 60 at Judd Bridge | River Street in Warrensburg | NY 418 | |
| CR 14 (2) | 0.70 | 1.13 | NY 418 | Milton Street and Library Avenue in Warrensburg | CR 9 | |
| CR 14 (3) | 0.06 | 0.10 | CR 9 | Stewart Farrar Street in Warrensburg | US 9 | |
| CR 15 | 4.27 | 6.87 | CR 62 / CR 64 | East Shore Drive in Horicon | Beaver Pond Road | |
| CR 16 | 5.34 | 8.59 | CR 44 | Bay Road and East River Drive in Lake Luzerne | Saratoga County line (becomes CR 9) | |
| CR 17 | 3.90 | 6.28 | US 9 | Round Pond, Blind Rock, and Haviland Roads in Queensbury | NY 9L | |
| CR 18 | 0.25 | 0.40 | NY 9N | Sagamore Road in Bolton | Bridge over Lake George | |
| CR 19 | 4.86 | 7.82 | Essex County line (becomes CR 29) | Olmstedville Road in Chester | US 9 | |
| CR 21 (1) | 4.68 | 7.53 | NY 8 | West Hague Road in Hague | Essex County line (becomes CR 38) | |
| CR 21 (2) | 2.25 | 3.62 | Essex County line (becomes CR 38) | West Hague Road in Hague | NY 9N | |
| CR 21A | 0.80 | 1.29 | CR 21 | New Hague Road in Hague | Essex County line (becomes CR 11) | |
| CR 22 | 8.60 | 13.84 | Bridge over Halfway Brook | Harrisburg Road in Stony Creek | Becomes CR 3 0.27 miles (0.43 km) north of CR 76 | |
| CR 23 | 0.31 | 0.50 | Infirmary Road | Gurney Lane in Queensbury | Ny 149, US 9, I-87 | |
| CR 24 | 0.36 | 0.58 | US 9 | Mountain Avenue, King Street, and Hackensack Avenue in Warrensburg | US 9 | Unsigned |
| CR 25 | 0.37 | 0.60 | CR 11 (segment 2) | Brook Street and Goodman Avenue in Bolton | NY 9N | |
| CR 26 | 7.69 | 12.38 | NY 8 | Palisades Road in Horicon | NY 8 | |
| CR 27 | 1.20 | 1.93 | CR 11 (segment 2) | Federal Hill Road in Bolton | CR 41 at Frank Cameron Road | |
| CR 28 | 5.20 | 8.37 | CR 32 at Lake Luzerne town line | Corinth Road and Main Street in Queensbury | Glens Falls city line | |
| CR 29 (1) | 4.23 | 6.81 | NY 8 | Peaceful Valley Road in Johnsburg | NY 28 | |
| CR 29 (2) | 0.20 | 0.32 | NY 28 | Peaceful Valley Road in Johnsburg | CR 77 | |
| CR 30 | 3.66 | 5.89 | CR 10 at Warrensburg town line | Schroon River Road in Chester | CR 53 at bridge over Schroon River | |
| CR 31 | 1.84 | 2.96 | CR 30 in Chester | Horicon Avenue | NY 8 in Horicon | |
| CR 32 | 5.26 | 8.47 | CR 16 | Call Street in Lake Luzerne | CR 28 at Queensbury town line | |
| CR 33 | 0.23 | 0.37 | NY 8 | Market Street in Horicon | NY 8 | |
| CR 34 | 0.94 | 1.51 | US 9 | Glenwood Avenue in Queensbury | CR 7 | |
| CR 35 | 3.89 | 6.26 | US 9 | Diamond Point–Bakers Crossing Road in Lake George | NY 9N | |
| CR 36 | 3.80 | 6.12 | CR 4 | Valley Road in Thurman | CR 13 | |
| CR 37 | 0.12 | 0.19 | Red Wing Road | Beaver Pond Road in Horicon | CR 55 | |
| CR 38 | 0.68 | 1.09 | NY 9L | Pilot Knob Road in Queensbury | Washington County line (becomes CR 32) | |
| CR 39 | 1.05 | 1.69 | NY 9L / CR 54 | Sunnyside East Road in Queensbury | Washington County line (becomes CR 35) | |
| CR 40 | 3.89 | 6.26 | CR 9 at Fish Hatchery Road | Golf Course Road in Warrensburg | NY 28 | |
| CR 41 | 4.28 | 6.89 | CR 27 at Frank Cameron Road | Federal Hill, Sawmill, and North Bolton Roads in Bolton | CR 11 (segment 1) | |
| CR 42 | 0.73 | 1.17 | Glens Falls city line | Dix Avenue in Queensbury | NY 32 | |
| CR 43 | 0.15 | 0.24 | Riverside Drive | Church Street in Chester | US 9 | |
| CR 44 | 0.52 | 0.84 | Saratoga County line (becomes CR 4) | Bridge, Main, and Mill Streets in Lake Luzerne | NY 9N | |
| CR 45 | 0.17 | 0.27 | US 9 | Water Street in Warrensburg | NY 418 / CR 9 | |
| CR 46 | 4.03 | 6.49 | NY 28 in Warrensburg | Potter Brook and Atateka Drives | CR 8 in Chester | |
| CR 47 | 0.61 | 0.98 | US 9 | Quaker Road in Queensbury | CR 34 | Entire length overlaps with NY 254 |
| CR 48 (1) | 1.12 | 1.80 | South Trout Lake Road | Lamb Hill Road in Bolton | East end of county maintenance | |
| CR 48 (2) | 2.22 | 3.57 | West end of county maintenance | Trout Lake Road in Bolton | NY 9N | |
| CR 48 (3) | 0.12 | 0.19 | CR 10 | County Home Bridge Road in Warrensburg | Bridge over Schroon River | |
| CR 49 | 4.04 | 6.50 | NY 9N | Coolidge Hill Road in Bolton | CR 48 (segment 2) | |
| CR 50 | 1.29 | 2.08 | NY 8 | Sunset Drive in Hague | CR 21 | |
| CR 51 | 0.51 | 0.82 | US 9 | Beach Road in Lake George | CR 6 | Unsigned |
| CR 52 | 3.63 | 5.84 | CR 79 | Queensbury Avenue and Hicks Road in Queensbury | NY 9L | |
| CR 53 | 0.99 | 1.59 | CR 30 at bridge over Schroon River | Watering Tub Road in Horicon | NY 8 | |
| CR 54 | 0.95 | 1.53 | CR 7 / CR 63 | Sunnyside Road in Queensbury | NY 9L / CR 39 | |
| CR 55 | 6.86 | 11.04 | CR 53 | Valentine Pond Road in Horicon | CR 37 | |
| CR 56 | 2.83 | 4.55 | US 9 / NY 8 | White School House–Butternut Flats Road in Chester | US 9 | |
| CR 57 | 6.84 | 11.01 | CR 4 at Garnet Lake Road in Thurman | South Johnsburg Road | NY 8 in Johnsburg | |
| CR 58 | 5.92 | 9.53 | CR 28 | West Mountain Road in Queensbury | CR 23, NY 149, I-87 | |
| CR 59 | 1.74 | 2.80 | US 9 | Bloody Pond Road in Lake George | NY 9L | |
| CR 60 (1) | 3.60 | 5.79 | NY 9N | Old Stage Road in Lake Luzerne | Warrensburg town line | |
| CR 60 (2) | 3.44 | 5.54 | Cross Road | Harrington Hill Road in Warrensburg | CR 14 at Judd Bridge | |
| CR 62 | 0.76 | 1.22 | CR 15 / CR 64 in Horicon | Glendale Road | US 9 in Chester | Formerly part of NY 9M |
| CR 63 | 1.17 | 1.88 | NY 149 | Moon Hill Road in Queensbury | CR 7 / CR 54 | |
| CR 64 | 3.94 | 6.34 | CR 55 | East Schroon River Road in Horicon | CR 15 / CR 62 | Formerly part of NY 9M |
| CR 65 | 1.43 | 2.30 | CR 8 | Knapp Hill Road in Chester | Riverside Drive | |
| CR 66 | 1.39 | 2.24 | CR 47 | Country Club Road in Queensbury | CR 17 | |
| CR 67 | 1.15 | 1.85 | CR 2 | Cameron Road in Thurman | CR 4 | |
| CR 68 | 4.89 | 7.87 | NY 8 | Landon Hill Road in Chester | US 9 | |
| CR 69 | 0.29 | 0.47 | US 9 | West Brook Road in Lake George | CR 51 | Unsigned |
| CR 70 | 3.33 | 5.36 | CR 34 | Quaker Road in Queensbury | NY 911E | Entire length overlaps with NY 254 |
| CR 71 | 0.95 | 1.53 | Flat Rock Road | Stone School House Road in Lake George | NY 9N | |
| CR 72 | 8.33 | 13.41 | Bridge over Pine Ridge Brook in Thurman | Garnet Lake Road | NY 8 in Johnsburg | |
| CR 73 | 1.30 | 2.09 | Gore Mountain | Gore Mountain Road in Johnsburg | CR 29 | |
| CR 74 | 1.82 | 2.93 | CR 8 | Atateka Drive in Chester | CR 46 | |
| CR 75 | 1.29 | 2.08 | CR 56 | Ben Culver Road in Chester | CR 68 | |
| CR 76 | 5.68 | 9.14 | CR 3 in Stony Creek | Lanfear, Murray, and Dartmouth Roads and High Street | CR 4 in Thurman | |
| CR 77 | 1.81 | 2.91 | NY 28 | Main Street in Johnsburg | NY 28 | Former routing of NY 28 |
| CR 78 | 3.40 | 5.47 | Beach Road | Thirteenth Lake Road in Johnsburg | NY 28 | |
| CR 79 | 0.84 | 1.35 | NY 32 / NY 911E | Boulevard in Queensbury | Washington County line (becomes CR 75) | Former routing of NY 32 |
| CR 80 | 0.14 | 0.23 | NY 28N | Circle Avenue in Johnsburg | CR 77 | Unsigned |
| CR 81 | 0.15 | 0.24 | Dead end | Railroad Place in Johnsburg | CR 77 | Unsigned |
| CR 82 | 0.11 | 0.18 | NY 28 | Ski Bowl Road in Johnsburg | CR 77 | Unsigned |
| CR 83 | 0.04 | 0.06 | The Great Escape & Splashwater Kingdom | Six Flags Drive in Queensbury | US 9 | Unsigned |

== See also ==
- County routes in New York
