= Kibbie Lake =

Lake in California, United States

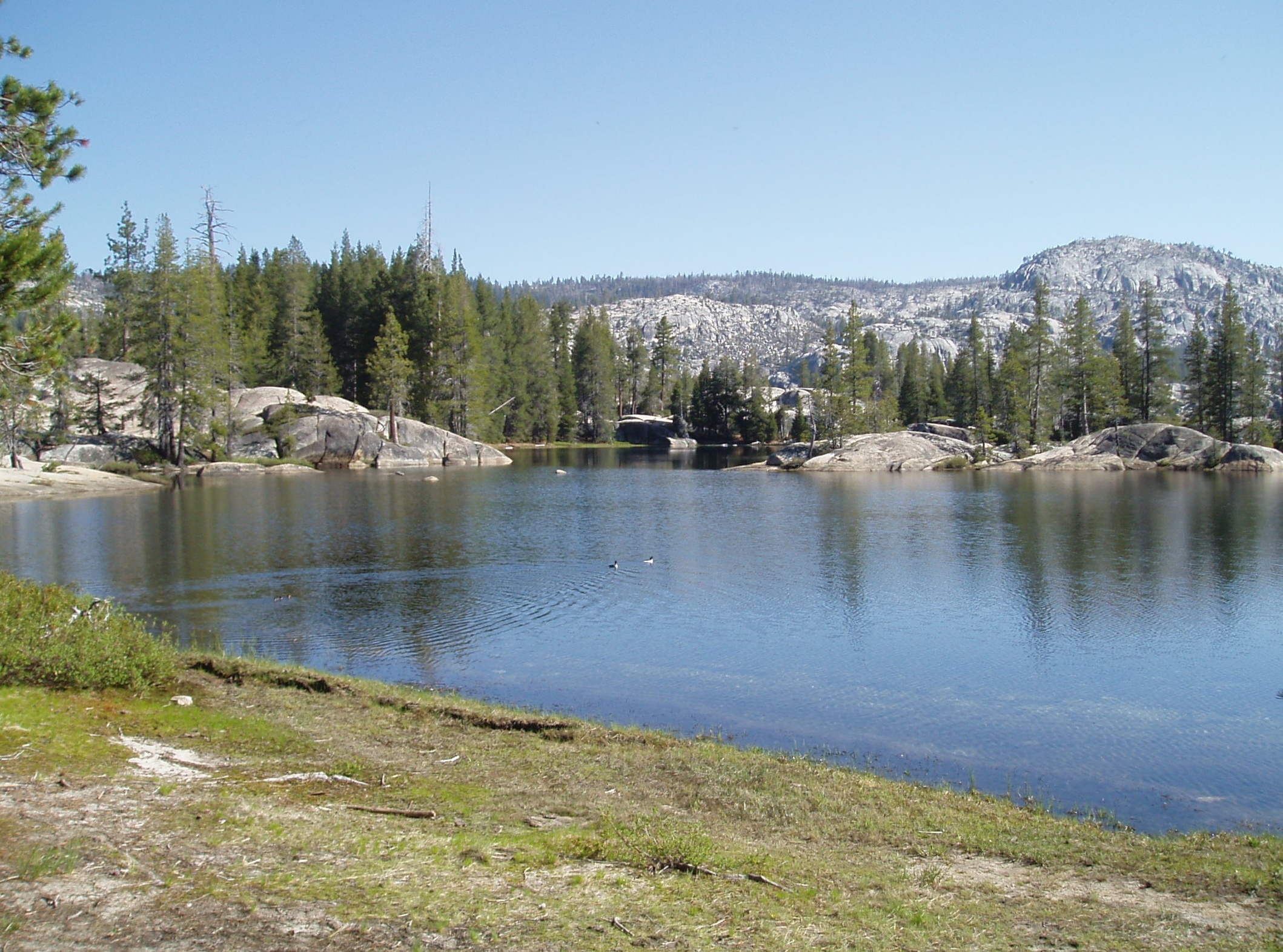

- Location within California Location within the United States
- Location: Yosemite National Park, Tuolumne County, California
- Coordinates: 38°03′14″N 119°50′45″W
- Basin countries: United States
- Surface elevation: 6,516 feet (1,986 m)

Kibbie Lake lies in the remote north-west portion of Yosemite National Park in the United States. It is accessible only to hikers and equestrians. It is the largest non-artificial lake in the national park.

The lake was named after H.M. Kibbie, who owned land near the lake.

The lake is surrounded by granodiorite, part of the Jack Main Canyon intrusive suite, emplaced approximately 91 million years ago.
