= Kibbee =

Kibbee is a surname. Notable people with the surname include:

- Guy Kibbee (1882–1956), American actor
- Lois Kibbee (1922–1993), American actress, daughter of Milton
- Milton Kibbee (1896–1970), American actor, brother of Guy
- Robert Kibbee (died 1982), American university administrator
- Roland Kibbee (1914–1984), American screenwriter and producer

== See also ==
- Kibbie (disambiguation)
- Kibbe (surname), a list of people
- Kibbeh, a Levantine dish made of bulgar, minced onions and finely ground meat
