= Johnsburg, New York =

Johnsburg
- Town
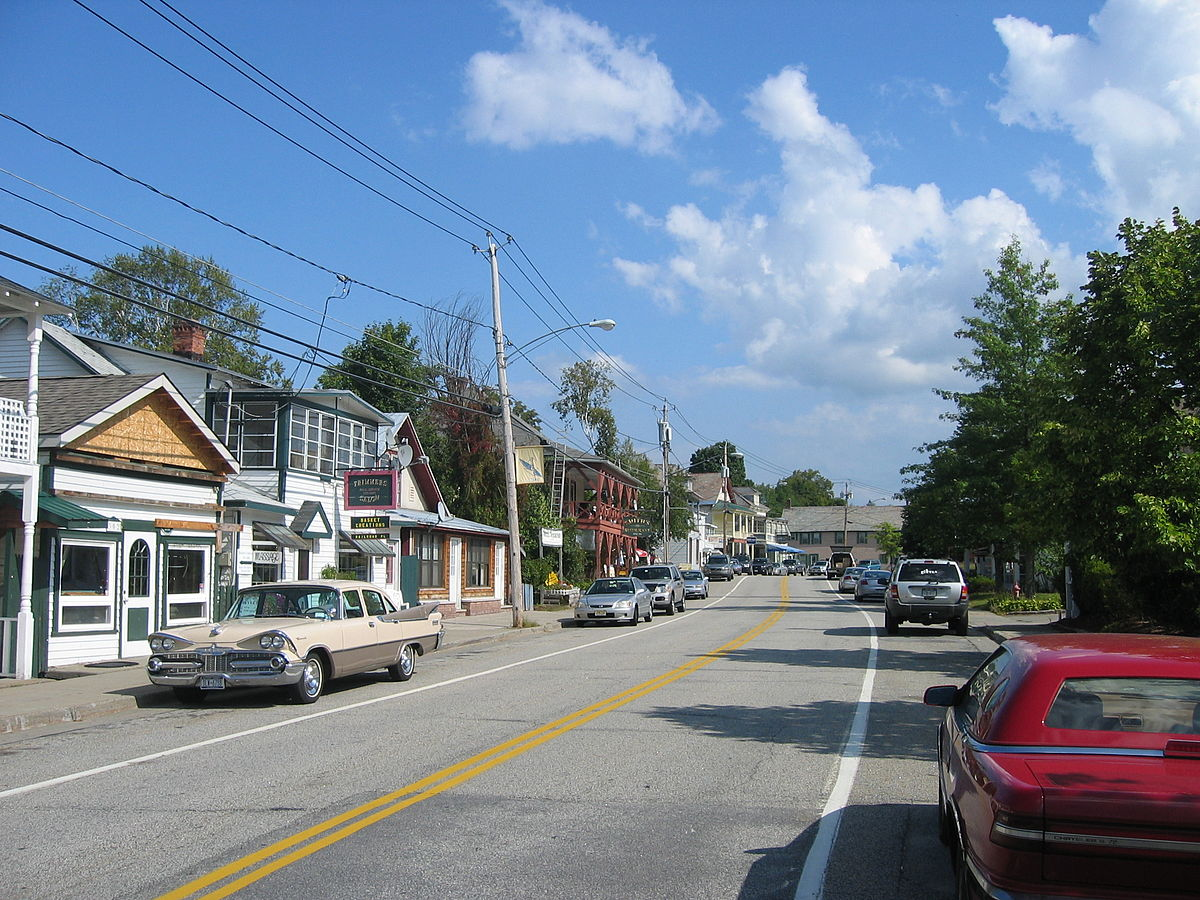
- Downtown North Creek, near Johnsburg, NY

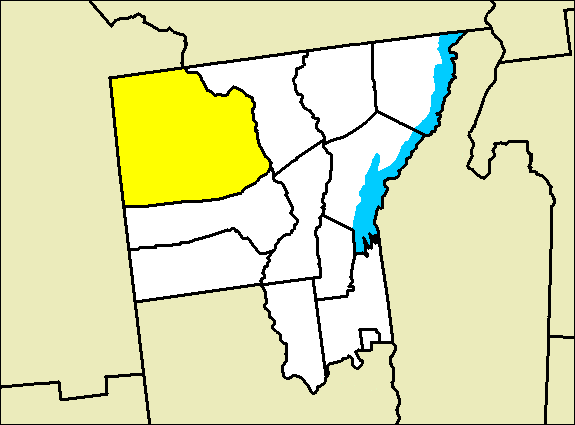
- Location of Johnsburg in Warren County

- Location within the state of New York
- Coordinates: 43°38′36″N 74°0′15″W
- Country: United States
- State: New York
- County: Warren

Area
  - Total: 206.74 sq mi (535.46 km^{2})
  - Land: 204.23 sq mi (528.95 km^{2})
  - Water: 2.51 sq mi (6.51 km^{2})
- Elevation: 2,287 ft (697 m)

Population (2020)
  - Total: 2,143
  - Density: 10.49/sq mi (4.051/km^{2})
- Time zone: UTC-5 (Eastern (EST))
  - Summer (DST): UTC-4 (EDT)
- ZIP code: 12843
- Area code: 518
- FIPS code: 36-38715
- GNIS feature ID: 0979109
- Website: www.johnsburgny.com

Johnsburg is a town in the northwestern corner of Warren County, New York, United States. It is part of the Glens Falls Metropolitan Statistical Area. The town population was 2,143 at the 2020 census. The town is named after John Thurman, an early settler and founder. Johnsburg is the largest town in Warren County by area.

== History ==
The town was first settled around 1788. The town of Johnsburg was formed (as the town of "Johnsburgh") from the town of Thurman in 1805.

== Geography ==
According to the United States Census Bureau, the town has a total area of 206.7 square miles (535 km^{2}), of which 204.2 square miles (529 km^{2}) is land and 2.5 square miles (6.5 km^{2}) (1.20%) is water.

The northern and western town lines are the border of Hamilton County. The eastern town line is marked by the Hudson River.

== Demographics ==
Historical population
Census	Pop.	Note	%±
1820	727		—
1830	985		35.5%
1840	1,139		15.6%
1850	1,503		32.0%
1860	2,188		45.6%
1870	2,599		18.8%
1880	2,742		5.5%
1890	2,894		5.5%
1900	2,374		−18.0%
1910	2,315		−2.5%
1920	2,242		−3.2%
1930	1,887		−15.8%
1940	2,000		6.0%
1950	2,076		3.8%
1960	2,250		8.4%
1970	2,377		5.6%
1980	2,173		−8.6%
1990	2,352		8.2%
2000	2,450		4.2%
2010	2,395		−2.2%
2020	2,143		−10.5%
U.S. Decennial Census

As of the census of 2000 there were 2,450 people, 999 households, and 666 families residing in the town. The population density was 12.0 inhabitants per square mile (4.6/km^{2}). There were 1,714 housing units at an average density of 8.4 per square mile (3.2/km^{2}). The racial makeup of the town was 98.41% White, 0.20% African American, 0.29% Native American, 0.29% Asian, 0.24% from other races, and 0.57% from two or more races. Hispanic or Latino of any race were 0.33% of the population.

There were 999 households, out of which 28.1% had children under the age of 18 living with them, 56.0% were married couples living together, 6.8% had a female householder with no husband present, and 33.3% were non-families. 27.8% of all households were made up of individuals, and 13.4% had someone living alone who was 65 years of age or older. The average household size was 2.36 and the average family size was 2.88.

In the town, the population was spread out, with 21.5% under the age of 18, 7.0% from 18 to 24, 26.8% from 25 to 44, 25.9% from 45 to 64, and 18.8% who were 65 years of age or older. The median age was 41 years. For every 100 females there were 92.3 males. For every 100 females age 18 and over, there were 90.9 males.

The median income for a household in the town was $30,559, and the median income for a family was $37,540. Males had a median income of $27,064 versus $20,862 for females. The per capita income for the town was $16,740. About 13.7% of families and 17.7% of the population were below the poverty line, including 27.2% of those under age 18 and 12.8% of those age 65 or over.

== Communities and locations in Johnsburg ==
- Bakers Mills – A hamlet in the central part of the town. This hamlet has ZIP code 12811.
- Christian Hill – A location west of North River.
- Edwards Hill – A location northwest of Bakers Mills.
- Garnet Lake – A hamlet near the southern town line at the northern end of a lake of that name.
- Hour Pond – A lake located southeast of Christian Hill.
- Johnsburg – hamlet on Route 8.
- Kibby Pond – A lake located southwest of Edwards Hill.
- Lower Fish Pond – A lake located southeast of Oregon.
- Lower Siamese Pond – A lake located northwest of Oregon.
- North Creek – A hamlet and the largest community, located in the northeastern part of the town. Gore Mountain Ski Center, Johnsburg town hall and library, and Johnsburg Central School are located in the hamlet.
- North River – A location near the northern town line, east of Christian Hill.
- Oregon – A location on NY-8.
- Puffer Pond – A lake located southwest of Christian Hill.
- Riparius – A hamlet by the eastern town line on Route 8.
- Second Pond – A lake located west of Gore Mountain.
- Sodom – A hamlet northwest of Johnsburg hamlet on Route 8.
- Thirteenth Lake – A lake located southwest of Christian Hill.
- Upper Fish Pond – A lake located southeast of Oregon.
- Upper Siamese Pond – A lake located northwest of Oregon.
- Wevertown – A hamlet northeast of Johnsburg hamlet on Route 8.

== Notable persons ==
Mathew Brady, the portrait photographer, grew up in Johnsburg.

Jeanne Robert Foster, the poet, model, war correspondent and editor grew up in Johnsburg.

Eben Rexford, the writer and song writer, grew up in Johnsburg
