= Thirteenth Lake =

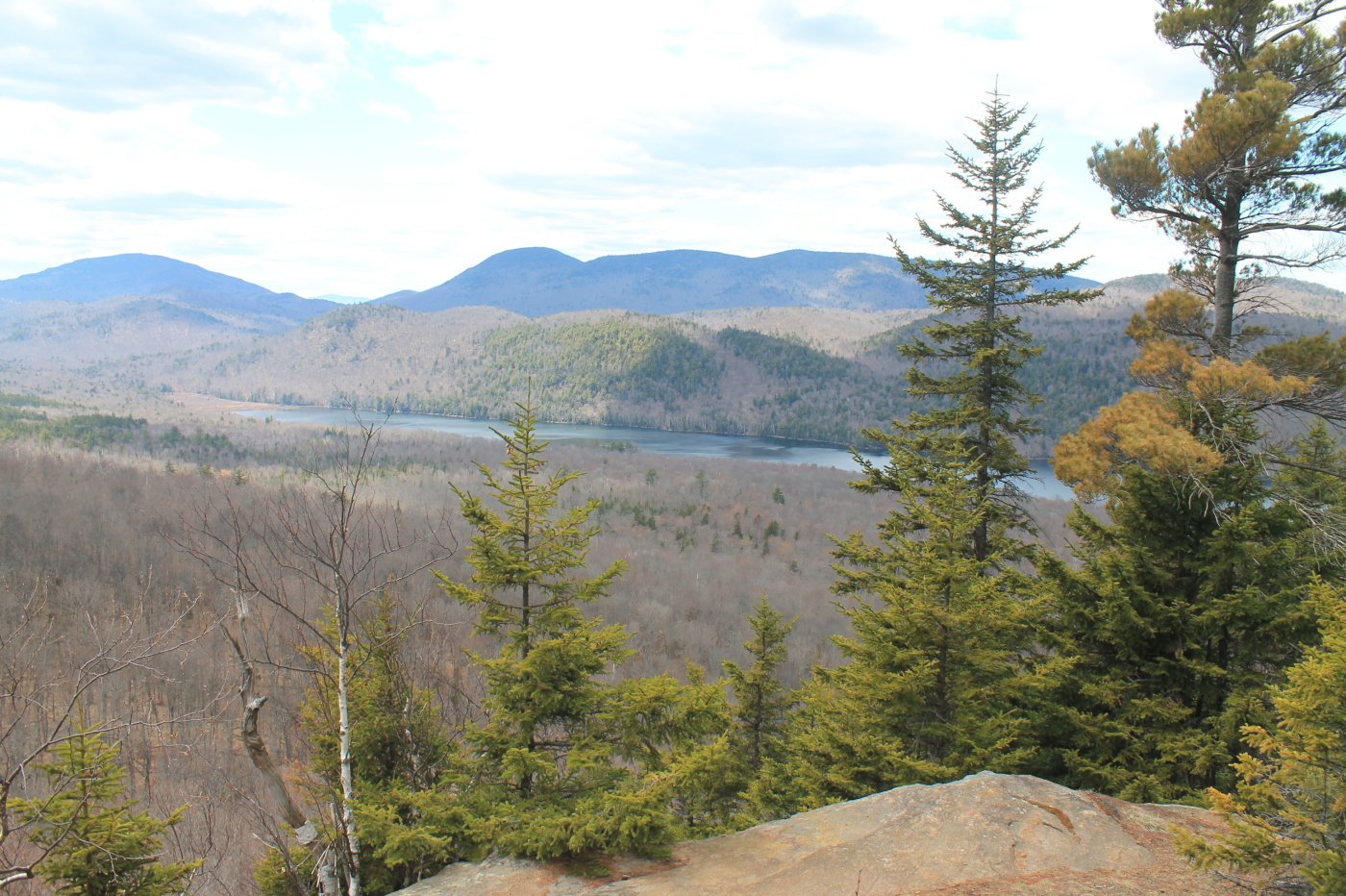
- Thirteenth Lake from Balm of Gilead Mountain

- Location within New York Location within the United States
- Location: Warren County, New York, United States
- Coordinates: 43°42′14″N 74°07′38″W
- Type: Lake
- Primary inflows: Buck Meadow Flowage, Peaked Mountain Brook
- Primary outflows: Thirteenth Brook
- Basin countries: United States
- Surface area: 329 acres (1.33 km^{2})
- Average depth: 20 feet (6.1 m)
- Max. depth: 49 feet (15 m)
- Shore length^{1}: 4.5 miles (7.2 km)
- Surface elevation: 1,673 feet (510 m)
- Settlements: Christian Hill, New York
- ^{1} Shore length is not a well-defined measure.

Thirteenth Lake is located southwest of Christian Hill, New York. Fish species present in the lake are brook trout, rainbow trout, brown trout, atlantic salmon, tiger trout, white sucker, and black bullhead. Access by carry down on the northeast shore. Only electric motors are allowed on Thirteenth Lake.
