= National Register of Historic Places listings in Albany, New York =

The city of Albany with NRHP listings identified by pinpoints

There are 78 properties listed on the National Register of Historic Places in Albany, New York, United States. Six are additionally designated as National Historic Landmarks (NHLs), the most of any city in the state after New York City. Another 14 are historic districts, for which 20 of the listings are also contributing properties. Two properties, both buildings, that had been listed in the past but have since been demolished have been delisted; one building that is also no longer extant remains listed.

The listed properties represent approximately 250 years of the city's history, from its 17th-century Dutch colonial origins to its suburban expansion in the mid-20th century. Reflecting Albany's position as New York's state capital are the main buildings of all three branches of state government. City Hall, the main offices of the city's school district, and the diocesan cathedrals of both the Episcopal and Roman Catholic churches are also included.

Some properties are recognized at least in part for unique attributes, such as the possible grave of the only British peer buried in the United States, the only destroyer escort still afloat and the only fireplace in that style remaining in the country. Others recognize historic firsts such as the discovery of electrical inductance, the first state government building in the country to house an educational agency and the first basketball game played outside Massachusetts, where the sport was invented. Prominent architects represented include nationally prominent figures such as Henry Hobson Richardson, Richard Morris Hunt, Richard Upjohn and Stanford White, as well as local ones like Marcus T. Reynolds. In addition to the architects and many state politicians, historic personages associated with the listed properties include George Washington, John McCloskey and Legs Diamond.

== Overview ==
The National Register of Historic Places, the U.S. national heritage register, was established by the National Historic Preservation Act of 1966. It is administered by the National Park Service (NPS). Properties to be listed are usually first approved by the state historic preservation offices for listing on their state-level heritage register and then nominated to the National Register. Sometimes they are nominated directly to the National Register. In New York the board is under the auspices of the state's Office of Parks, Recreation and Historic Preservation.

A separate NPS program has jurisdiction over properties nominated for National Historic Landmark status, which must be formally granted by the Secretary of the Interior. There is no requirement that a property nominated for NHL status previously have been listed on the Register, although many were. NHLs that were not previously listed on the Register are listed administratively when they are designated NHLs. The NHL program predates the Register by a few years, and NHLs that had been designated prior to the establishment of the Register were administratively listed when the latter was established.

=== Geographical distribution ===
Outside the city, Albany County has another 148 listings. One listing, the Albany Felt Company Complex, is shared with the neighboring town of Menands. Two of the listings, the USS Slater and Whipple Cast and Wrought Iron Bowstring Truss Bridge, were moved to Albany from other locations.

Most of the listed properties are located in central Albany, close to the Hudson River and the original boundaries of the city, an area today largely coterminous with one listing, the Downtown Albany Historic District. The south end of the Albany Felt Company Complex in the city's northeast corner is its easternmost listing. Near the city's southern boundary, overlooking Interstate 787, is Nut Grove, the southernmost entry. The Rapp Road Community Historic District, in an area rural for much of its existence until the development of Crossgates Mall nearby, is at the western and northern extreme. (Note: These can be verified by clicking on the OpenStreetMap or Google Maps links below.)

The downtown historic district takes those boundaries from the stockade built by the Dutch as part of Fort Orange in 1624. The mostly buried remnants of the fort are one of the city's NHLs, and the oldest of its Register listings. Until the late 19th century, downtown and its neighboring areas was the entire developed city.

=== Historic districts ===
Historic districts are groupings of properties, usually under different ownership, that share a common historical background. They are sometimes recognized by local zoning codes. Not all are actually called historic districts—in Albany, the small "Broadway Row" of four townhouses is officially listed as Buildings at 744–750 Broadway. There are 14 historic districts listed on the Register in the city.

All but two (Note: The Lustron Houses of Jermain Street is further southwest, closer to the Harriman State Office Complex, and Rapp Road is near the Albany Pine Bush preserve in the city's western extension.) of them districts are clustered, contiguously in some areas, in this same section of the city along the river. The districts range in size from 136-acre (55 ha) Washington Park to Broadway Row, Knox Street and the Lustron Houses of Jermain Street, all less than an acre (4,000 m^{2}). (Note: The nomination form for the Broadway Row does not give any area, but the four rowhouses, all depicted in the photo with the listing, have a combined footprint of less than half the small city block they occupy.)

Combined, the historic districts equal 580 acres (230 ha), about 4% of Albany's total land area. They have over 2,000 buildings, structures, objects or sites within their boundaries. Over 90% of those are considered contributing properties to their districts' historic character. (Note: With one exception, these figures are derived from the numbers given in their nomination forms, at the time of those nominations, which date back as far as 1980. Some districts, particularly the South End, have lost some of their significant properties to neglect in the meantime. In particular, the small Broadway–Livingston Avenue Historic District north of downtown, had 20 buildings and a railway bridge as contributing properties when listed. As of February 2018, 11 of the buildings have been demolished, so this very small district was counted as having the nine buildings it actually does. Also, the nomination form for Center Square/Hudson–Park, does not include an enumeration of the total properties in the district, much less distinguish between contributing and non-contributing properties, so it was not included in this count.)

Most of the districts are primarily residential enclaves, with some other uses scattered throughout. They reflect different stages of the city's growth, from onetime neighborhoods of the city's wealthy like the Ten Broeck Triangle to immigrant-settled areas like the Mansion District and South End. The two exceptions are downtown, primarily commercial, and the government buildings, monuments and parks that make up most of the Lafayette Park Historic District.

== Property types and use ==
Of the remaining 43 extant listings, all but three are buildings or complexes of buildings. Those other three include one structure (the Whipple Cast and Wrought Iron Bowstring Truss Bridge), one maritime site (the USS Slater) and one archeological site (Fort Orange). The historic districts include some other structures, such as the parks that give two of them their names, (Note: Lafayette and Washington parks. Some smaller parks are included in the other historic districts.) and objects like the statues near the state capitol and one of the city's remaining trolley poles, among their contributing properties. Five listed buildings are vacant (Note: Albany Union Station, Church of the Holy Innocents, Stephen and Harriet Myers Residence, Old Post Office and the United Traction Company Building) and one, the Abrams Building, remains listed despite its demolition in 1987.

=== Government and military ===
Reflecting Albany's status as New York's capital, 17 of the 41 extant buildings listed individually, more than one-third of that total, have been used for governmental purposes at some point. (Note: Six—City Hall, Hook and Ladder No. 4, the State Education Department Building, the New Scotland Avenue Armory, Court of Appeals Building and state capitol—are purpose-built government structures still in use by the governments that built them. The Delaware and Hudson Building, governor's mansion and Schuyler Mansion were privately built and later acquired by the state. Albany Academy's former building was acquired by the school district for use as its main office in the 1930s; it has also annexed the James Hall Office to one of its elementary schools. In the other direction, the city has sold the Harmanus Bleecker Library and Quackenbush Pumping Station, while the state no longer owns the Washington Avenue Armory. Two of the non-building listings, Fort Orange and the Slater, were also originally built by governments.) The city government is responsible for three of those, its school district for two and the federal government one (the Old Post Office), with the rest accounted for by state government. Among the latter are the main buildings of all three branches of state government: the governor's mansion (executive), Court of Appeals Building (judicial) and the state capitol (legislative). In only three other states is this so. (Note: Minnesota, Ohio and South Carolina.)

Among the contributing properties to the historic districts are two buildings representing the federal and county governments, both courthouses. The 1934 Art Deco James T. Foley United States Courthouse, in the downtown district, houses the United States District Court for the Northern District of New York as well as the local office of some other federal law enforcement agencies. When built it also replaced the Old Post Office. It is the only building used by the federal government among the Register listings in Albany. In 2020 it was listed on the Register individually.

Albany County government does not account for any individually listed properties. However, in the Lafayette Park district, the county courthouse is a contributing property. At that time it was used for all county governmental functions, but since then most non-judicial departments have moved to a 1920s 13-story office building on State Street that contributes to the downtown historic district.

A prominent state government office, the Alfred E. Smith Building, also contributes to the Center Square/Hudson–Park Historic District. Some former police and fire buildings are contributing properties to that and other districts. (Note: Elsewhere in Center Square is the city's former police and fire signaling station, and a former firehouse also contributes. A former police station is among the contributing properties to the Clinton Avenue Historic District, and likewise the South End has another former firehouse.)

Four of the properties listed have, or have had, a military purpose. The original Fort Orange, built by the Dutch colonial authorities of New Netherland, defended the fledgling settlement. In the late 19th century, the state built the two armories for the National Guard. The Slater was commissioned by the Navy for service in the Pacific theater of World War II; it was later sold to the Greek Navy, where it was rechristened the Aetos.

=== Education, arts and sciences ===
Government entities also control the four buildings used for educational purposes. Three are used for administrative purposes—the Old Albany Academy Building, originally a private school, is the City School District of Albany's main offices, the former headquarters of the Delaware and Hudson Railroad is now the main administration building for the State University of New York (SUNY) system and the State Department of Education Building is home to that agency, which oversees public education in the state. The James Hall Office building has been annexed to one of the city's elementary schools, later used for a Montessori school. The former Philip Livingston Magnet Academy, now converted into senior apartments, is the only purpose-built public school building listed so far in Albany. Two former public school buildings are included as contributing properties in the South End district, and the former St. Joseph's Academy is a contributing property to Arbor Hill.

The Harmanus Bleecker Library, originally built by the city as its first library but now redeveloped privately as office space, is one of eight properties with a past or present cultural function. Of the other seven only two, the Albany Institute of History & Art and the Palace Theatre, are purpose-built for their continuing role. The Institute, the city's major museum, is joined by three historic house museums and the Slater in that function. Lastly, the Washington Avenue Armory is now used for some concerts. Contributing properties to the historic districts with cultural functions include the John A. Howe Branch library in the South End.

Three properties also commemorate scientific discoveries and technological accomplishments. As a professor at the Albany Academy, Joseph Henry discovered electrical inductance, which would later lead to the development of the telegraph and all subsequent information technology. The building has since been renamed in his memory. James Hall made many of his paleontological and geological breakthroughs from the research in his office and laboratory.

While Squire Whipple was an Albany resident whose bowstring truss bridge design was based on his own mathematical studies of the stresses on bridge trusses, work which helped move bridge building from a craft to a science, he did not have anything to do with the construction of the bridge that shares his name. It is believed to be the work of one of many bridge builder copying his design, which was portable and easy to assemble. Albany's bridge is one of only two in that design still in use in New York, one of the oldest surviving iron bridges in the country and one of the few of those that use both cast and wrought iron.

==== Religion and institutional ====
All 10 of the listed buildings used for religious purposes are or were Christian churches. Two are Catholic (Note: Cathedral of the Immaculate Conception and St. Mary's Church) and six are used by various Protestant denominations (the Episcopal Church accounts for three). (Note: Calvary Methodist Episcopal Church, Cathedral of All Saints, First Reformed Church, St. Andrew's Episcopal Church and St. Peter's Episcopal Church.) Church of the Holy Innocents, which is vacant, was built for an Episcopal congregation and later used for Russian Orthodox worship.

Three of the listed churches—the First Reformed Church St. Peter's Episcopal Church and St. Mary's Church—are home to Albany's oldest congregations in their denominations. The First Reformed Church, dating to 1634, is also the city's oldest church building and the oldest Christian congregation in upstate New York. St. Mary's, established near the end of the 18th century, is likewise the oldest Catholic congregation in the city and upstate. All Saints and Immaculate Conception are, respectively, the cathedrals of the Episcopal and Catholic dioceses of Albany. Immaculate Conception is further distinguished as the second-oldest Catholic cathedral in the state after St. Patrick's in New York City.

In the historic districts, fourteen churches are contributing properties. They include some prominent local churches, like St. Joseph's, the city's third Catholic church, in the Ten Broeck Triangle section of the Arbor Hill district. Others are historically important, like Mt. Calvary Baptist Church in the South End, the only remaining wood frame church in the city. The one purpose-built synagogue among the contributing properties, Wilborn Temple in Center Square, has since been converted into a church.

Only one property is used for non-profit institutional use outside of a religious organization. Nut Grove, a former mansion on the south boundary of the city, is now part of a substance-abuse rehabilitation facility, following its use as a hospice. The Schuyler Mansion, another former center of a large estate, was used as an orphanage between the family's occupancy and its acquisition by the state.

=== Residential ===
All of the nine present or former residential properties listed are purpose-built single-family houses. Of them, only the governor's mansion is still used that way. Four of the others have been converted into office space or other commercial use (Note: The Benjamin Walworth Arnold House and Carriage House, Walter Merchant House, Quackenbush House and Van Ostrande–Radliff House) and three old mansions—Cherry Hill and the Schuyler and Ten Broeck mansions—have been converted into historic house museums. The Stephen and Harriet Myers Residence, a former stop on the Underground Railroad, is vacant but being converted into one. Nut Grove, as noted above, is now part of a substance-abuse treatment center.

By contrast, the historic districts are overwhelmingly residential. The smallest ones—Jermain Street, Knox Street and Rapp Road—are composed entirely of houses. Four rowhouses, possibly to become office space, make up the Broadway Row. Among the larger districts closer to the city's core only downtown is primarily commercial or mixed-use, although a few older houses remain. The Lafayette Park district is mostly large government buildings, but has a residential block at one corner.

Most of the contributing residential properties, like the individually listed ones, were built as single-family homes. Most that are multiple-unit dwellings are those homes that have been subdivided into duplexes; however there are some apartment houses in Arbor Hill, Center Square and the South End. The latter two also have former industrial buildings that have been converted into apartments.

=== Commercial ===
Eleven of the listed buildings have either been built or adapted for commercial purposes. The former group accounts for six buildings. All but one remains in commercial use—the former headquarters of the Delaware and Hudson Railroad, now in government and educational reuse as the system administration building for the State University of New York. Commercially repurposed buildings were primarily houses, with four of those listed as such now serving as office space. One former government building, the city's Quackenbush Pumping Station, is now the Albany Pump Station brewpub.

Among the contributing properties to the downtown historic district are five of the listed commercial buildings, three purpose-built and two adapted, as well as the SUNY system administration building. Of the other six, only the Arnold House contributes to another historic district, Washington Park. Downtown's contributing properties also include other significant commercial buildings in the city's history such as the Home Savings Bank Building, Albany's tallest building at the time of its 1927 construction. Some of Center Square's rowhouses have also been converted into offices. Lark Street, with many shops, runs through the district as well. Another significant commercial corridor, South Pearl Street, runs through the South End and then the Mansion before reaching downtown. Green Street in the Pastures district also has a small row with commercial storefronts.

=== Transportation and infrastructure ===
Two listings—the former Union Station building and the Whipple Cast and Wrought Iron Bowstring Truss Bridge—served transportation purposes for most of their existence. The former was converted to office space after passenger train service stopped in 1968. The latter, once used as a road bridge into a farm on the city's outskirts, is now used only by pedestrians due to its age since the farm became a public park.

Outside of transportation purposes, there is one other building that was part of the city's infrastructure. The Albany Pump Station was formerly the Quackenbush Pumping Station of the city's water system. When the city switched from using the nearby Hudson River to Alcove Reservoir as its primary water source in 1937, it was taken out of service. After several decades of neglect it has been revived as a brewpub.

There are two significant transportation-related resources among the contributing properties to the historic districts. Most prominent is the former railroad bridge in the Broadway–Livingston Avenue Historic District, a Warren truss dating to 1900. In Center Square there is also one of the two surviving overhead wire poles from the city's trolley system.

=== Open space ===
Four parks in the city are included in its listings. Lincoln Park is listed individually, and Swinburne Park is listed along with neighboring Bleecker Stadium. Lafayette and Washington parks are contributing properties to the historic districts that bear their names.

== Architects and architecture ==
Most of the listed properties date from the mid-19th to early 20th centuries, the period of the city's greatest prosperity and growth. As such the architectural styles most prevalent are from that era. From outside there are more from older periods than newer.

Despite the city's founding by the Dutch, only one listed property, the Van Ostrande–Radliff House, the city's oldest building, is a genuine example of Dutch Colonial architecture. Even then its Dutch features that do survive are more structural and internal, most notably its jambless fireplace, the only one in that style remaining in the country. English colonial styles are more visibly represented by the Georgian Schuyler Mansion.

The Ten Broeck Mansion, built near the end of the 18th century, is the earliest listing postdating American independence. Like Schuyler's a gabled brick estate house, its early use of the similarly classically-inspired Federal style shows the transition from colonial architecture to the modes of the new nation and century. Philip Hooker's First Reformed Church, another Federal structure completed shortly after Ten Broeck's mansion, was his first major building. With the Old Albany Academy Building in 1815 Hooker would further develop the Federal style in the city. The style persisted in vernacular forms as late as 1838, when the brick house of strawberry-farming pioneer James Wilson, the oldest contributing property to the Knox Street Historic District, was built.

Following the opening of the Erie Canal in the 1820s, a new generation of builders continued the evolution of the classically inspired form into the Greek Revival, which made its mark in the city shortly before mid-century. The houses of the Broadway Row show this transition from the Federal style. It would be used for both the upscale townhouses of Elk Street, one of Albany's most distinguished addresses for decades afterwards, and the restrained frame houses of Foley's Row in the South End, speculative housing built for lower-income buyers. The style was often used for public buildings, and in Albany it made its grand entrance with 1842's colonnaded State Hall (now the Court of Appeals Building), its rotunda using all three classical orders. South of the city limits at the time of its construction, Alexander Jackson Davis's Nut Grove is his only Greek Revival house within the Hudson Valley, and a rare example of the Grecian country house within that style.

The Victorian styles that dominated architecture in the second half of the century made their debuts in Albany at its midpoint. The small building in Lincoln Park where James Hall did his groundbreaking paleontological research is an Italian villa-style variant of the Italianate style, built from a pattern designed by Andrew Jackson Downing and his student Calvert Vaux, erected in 1852, the year of the former's death. Elsewhere in the city, the Italianate style proved ideal for the many rowhouses going up, particularly along Clinton Avenue, where different stretches show the transition from the Greek Revival and how it was applied before and after the Civil War. The Walter Merchant House on Washington Avenue, one of the more developed applications of the Italianate rowhouse in Albany, is one of the rare detached, larger ones remaining.

As they had elsewhere, churches were instrumental in bringing the Gothic Revival to Albany. The city's Episcopalians were the first, with Frank Wills' Church of the Holy Innocents in 1850. Two years later Patrick Keely built the Gothic Cathedral of the Immaculate Conception for the newly established Roman Catholic Diocese of Albany. Lutherans in the South End put up the German Evangelical Protestant Church, still a focal point of that neighborhood, in 1857. At the end of the decade the Episcopal Church brought in Gothic Revival pioneer Richard Upjohn, along with his son, to design the new St. Peter's Episcopal Church building in the French Gothic mode.

The complicated construction of the state capitol wound up embracing the century's later architectural movements. In 1867, Thomas Fuller began the new building in the Second Empire style. Nine years and three stories later, however, amid mounting criticism of his work and the costs of the project, he was replaced by Leopold Eidlitz and Henry Hobson Richardson, who oversaw the construction of the next two floors in the Renaissance Revival style. They lasted until 1883, when new governor Grover Cleveland replaced them with Isaac Perry, who supervised the building through its 1899 completion, moving toward a more Romanesque style as he did so.

Some of the architects who worked on the capitol graced Albany with other projects. After an 1880 fire destroyed city hall, Richardson designed its replacement, completed in 1883, a period when he is generally regarded as having been at his creative peak. Perry built the Washington Avenue Armory for the state seven years later. The Renaissance Revival style used for the capitol's later floors was complemented when that style was used for another project with a complicated history, the city's 1883 post office.

The more decorative styles of the fin de siècle began to appear in Albany during the 1890s. Richard Morris Hunt built the Rice Mansion, the only freestanding Beaux Arts mansion in the city, now part of the Albany Institute of History & Art, during that time. In the last years of the century, the new Union Station by Shepley, Rutan and Coolidge brought the style to where most visitors entered the city.

In the first decades of the new century, another new style, Colonial Revival, came to the city. Stanford White's Benjamin Walworth Arnold House, his only building in the city, was also the first to use it, in 1905. A decade later, the First Congregational Church of Albany 1917 Woodlawn building by Albert W. Fuller attracted considerable media attention as the first Colonial Revival church in the city. It would receive its highest application in the city 15 years later with the opening of Philip Livingston Junior High School at the city's northern entrance, one of its few landmark buildings outside downtown.

== Historical context ==
Early expansion, fueled by the 1825 completion of the Erie Canal and the immigrant populations it attracted, largely went to the north and south of the original settlement, absorbing large earlier estates in the latter direction such as the Schuyler Mansion, Cherry Hill and Nut Grove leading to the development of the Arbor Hill, Mansion, Pastures and South End historic districts.

West of that historic core, the first city hall and state capitol buildings around what later became Lafayette Park spurred some development around them early in the 19th century. Near the end of the century, the completion of the current capitol and Washington Park gave a new impetus to the city's growth in that direction, opening up the Center Square neighborhood.

By the 1920s streetcar lines were running out to newer, more suburban neighborhoods to the west and southwest. Two of the listed churches helped pioneer the development of the Pine Hills neighborhood; the city built Hook and Ladder No. 4, the only fire station listed, to serve another new enclave. After World War II, another suburban building boom and new technologies combined to create the Lustron Houses of Jermain Street Historic District, the most recently constructed of the city's Register listings.

This National Park Service list is complete through NPS recent listings posted October 16, 2026.

== Listings ==
Legend: National Register of Historic Places listing National Historic Landmark Historic district National Historic Landmark District

	Name on the Register	Image	Date listed	Location	Neighborhood	Description
1	Abrams Building	Abrams Building	February 14, 1980 (#80002577)	55–57 South Pearl Street; 42°38′53″N 73°45′15″W	Downtown	When listed, it was one of the few commercial buildings downtown with its original storefront. In 1987 it was demolished to make way for the Times Union Center.
2	The Albany Academy	The Albany Academy	February 18, 1971 (#71000515)	Academy Park; 42°39′11″N 73°45′18″W	Downtown	Philip Hooker designed the original home of the Albany Academy, one of his two remaining buildings in the city. Now the main office of the City School District of Albany, it is sometimes known as the Joseph Henry Memorial after the scientist who discovered electrical inductance here in 1829.
3	Albany City Hall	Albany City Hall	September 4, 1972 (#72000812)	Eagle Street at Maiden Lane; 42°39′06″N 73°45′16″W	Downtown	Designed by Henry Hobson Richardson in his particular Romanesque style, this 1883 structure is from the period considered as his architectural peak. Small donations by more than 25,000 residents paid for the installation of a carillon, the first to be installed in an American municipal building, in 1927.
4	Albany Felt Company Complex	Albany Felt Company Complex	February 14, 2014 (#14000001)	1373 Broadway; 42°40′34″N 73°44′12″W	North Albany	Early 20th-century factory complex with extensive landscaping. Extends into Menands, elsewhere in Albany County
5	Albany Industrial and Warehouse Historic District	Albany Industrial and Warehouse Historic District	July 16, 2026 (#100013226)	Generally Eric Boulevard, North Pearl Street, and Tivoli Street; 42°39′50″N 73°44′39″W		
6	Albany Institute of History & Art	Albany Institute of History & Art	July 12, 1976 (#76001202)	135 Washington Avenue; 42°39′21″N 73°45′36″W	Washington Avenue	Two connected buildings house the Albany Institute, created by the merger of two separate learned societies in 1824. Richard Morris Hunt designed the older Rice House, the only freestanding Beaux arts-style mansion in Albany. In 1907, the Institute added a similar structure by Marcus T. Reynolds for offices and collections. Both were renovated around the turn of the millennium.
7	Albany Perforated Wrapping Paper Co.	Albany Perforated Wrapping Paper Co.	April 28, 2022 (#100007679)	19 Erie Boulevard; 42°39′51″N 73°44′21″W	Warehouse District	1918 factory built by first manufacturer of modern toilet paper.
8	Albany Union Station	Albany Union Station	February 18, 1971 (#71000516)	East Side of Broadway between Columbia and Steuben Streets; 42°39′05″N 73°44′58″W	Downtown	Built during 1899–1900, this Beaux-Arts station "provided an ultra-modern first impression" to visitors and potential investors until it closed in 1968. From the mid-1980s to 2009 it was reused as a bank.
9	Albany VA Main Hospital Building	Albany VA Main Hospital Building	July 15, 2022 (#100007908)	113 Holland Avenue; 42°38′59″N 73°46′28″W		Built in 1951 to meet needs of enlarged veteran population after World War II. Part of United States Third Generation Veterans' Hospitals, 1946–1958 MPS
10	Arbor Hill Historic District–Ten Broeck Triangle	Arbor Hill Historic District–Ten Broeck Triangle	January 25, 1979; September 29, 1984 (increase) (#79001564)	Irregular pattern along Ten Broeck Street from Clinton Avenue to Livingston Avenue; 42°39′26″N 73°45′07″W	Arbor Hill	Albany's 19th-century industrialists and merchants built stately homes in this intact 34-acre (14 ha) enclave south of the Ten Broeck Mansion. Two large churches serve as focal points. A 1984 westward expansion of the district boundaries more than doubled its size.
11	Benjamin Walworth Arnold House and Carriage House	Benjamin Walworth Arnold House and Carriage House	July 26, 1982 (#82003342)	465 State Street and 307 Washington Avenue; 42°39′31″N 73°46′07″W	Washington Avenue	Stanford White's early use of the Colonial Revival style for this house of a local lumberman and financier attracted considerable notice when it was built in 1905. The two are his only buildings in Albany.
12	Bleecker Stadium and Swinburne Park	Bleecker Stadium and Swinburne Park	February 20, 2018 (#100000889)	Clinton Avenue; 42°40′14″N 73°46′35″W	West Hill	Park built up from 1850s flower garden includes stadium converted from a reservoir by WPA during New Deal
13	Boardman and Gray Piano Company	Boardman and Gray Piano Company	July 27, 2022 (#100007951)	883 Broadway; 42°38′51″N 73°44′21″W		
14	Broadway–Livingston Avenue Historic District	Broadway–Livingston Avenue Historic District	January 7, 1988 (#87002300)	Broadway and Livingston Avenue; 42°39′27″N 73°44′53″W	Arbor Hill and North Albany	Nine buildings of the original 20 that surround this intersection. They comprise the only remaining intact 19th-century commercial-residential cluster on north Broadway. A 1900 Warren Truss railroad bridge is a contributing structure.
15	Building at 44 Central Avenue	Building at 44 Central Avenue	February 14, 2014 (#14000002)	44 Central Avenue; 42°39′30″N 73°46′04″W	Washington Avenue	1840s Federal style building is one of few remainders of city's turnpike era.
16	Buildings at 744, 746, 748, 750 Broadway	Buildings at 744, 746, 748, 750 Broadway	December 17, 1987 (#87002180)	744–750 Broadway; 42°39′23″N 73°44′55″W	Arbor Hill	These four row houses, built 1833–1870, are the only that remain of the many that once lined this section of Broadway.
17	Calvary Methodist Episcopal Church	Calvary Methodist Episcopal Church	February 28, 2008 (#08000094)	715 Morris Street; 42°39′53″N 73°47′31″W	Pine Hills	This church was notable during the development of the Pine Hills neighborhood, having served an important cultural function during the neighborhood's massive growth in the early 1900s. It is also an example of an early-20th-century Collegiate Gothic brick church.
18	Cathedral of All Saints	Cathedral of All Saints	July 25, 1974 (#74001213)	South Swan Street; 42°39′17″N 73°45′28″W	Downtown	A young Robert W. Gibson beat out Henry Hobson Richardson in 1884 for this commission, a cathedral long sought by the wealthy families in Albany's Episcopal diocese. The most ambitious plan for an Episcopal cathedral in its time, it was never finished due to the construction of the nearby Education Department building almost three decades later.
19	Cathedral of the Immaculate Conception	Cathedral of the Immaculate Conception	June 8, 1976 (#76001203)	125 Eagle Street; 42°38′52″N 73°45′36″W	Mansion District	Designed by Patrick Keeley and built in 1848-52, Immaculate Conception was the second Catholic cathedral to be built in New York after St. Patrick's, third in the country and the first American Catholic building in the Neo-Gothic style. Its recently-renovated interior retains the original English stained glass windows. For the rest of the century it was the tallest building in the city.
20	Center Square/Hudson–Park Historic District	Center Square/Hudson–Park Historic District	March 18, 1980 (#80002578)	Roughly bounded by Park Avenue, State, Lark and South Swan Streets; 42°39′09″N 73°45′51″W	Center Square and Hudson/Park	This 27-block area west of the Empire State Plaza has a diverse collection of 19th- and early-20th-century buildings in contemporary architectural styles by both prominent and vernacular architects. Most are rowhouses, with some churches and office and industrial buildings included.
21	Cherry Hill	Cherry Hill	February 18, 1971 (#71000517)	South Pearl Street between 1st and McCarthy Avenues; 42°38′05″N 73°45′49″W	South End	Built by Colonel Philip van Rensselaer in 1768 for his wife Maria Sanders (granddaughter of Albany's first mayor Pieter Schuyler), this colonial home remained in the Van Rensselaer family for nearly two centuries. Today it is a museum exhibiting family heirlooms from that era.
22	Church of the Holy Innocents	Church of the Holy Innocents	January 31, 1978 (#78001836)	275 North Pearl Street; 42°39′32″N 73°44′54″W	Arbor Hill	An early example of the Gothic Revival style of architecture in America, an onion dome was added when this 1850 Episcopal church became Russian Orthodox. Noted for its John Bolton-designed stained glass windows, the church was located in "the most fashionable area of Albany during the 1840s and 1850s." It is now abandoned.
23	Clinton Avenue Historic District	Clinton Avenue Historic District	September 1, 1988 (#88001445)	Along Clinton Avenue from Quail to North Pearl Streets; 42°39′40″N 73°45′42″W	Arbor Hill and West Hill	Over 90% of the buildings along this 1.5-mile (2.4 km) stretch of Clinton, and some side streets, are 19th-century rowhouses, the largest concentration in Albany.
24	Consolidated Car Heating Company Complex	Consolidated Car Heating Company Complex	November 1, 2021 (#100007080)	413 North Pearl Street, 928-940 Broadway; 42°39′44″N 73°44′41″W	Warehouse District	1893 headquarters of developer of railcar heating systems
25	Delaware and Hudson Railroad Company Building	Delaware and Hudson Railroad Company Building	March 16, 1972 (#72000813)	The Plaza on State Street; 42°38′53″N 73°44′58″W	Downtown	One of Albany's most distinctive landmarks, Marcus T. Reynolds' 1914 copy of the Cloth Hall tower in Ypres, Belgium, is often taken by visitors to be the state capitol. It and the Plaza in front were the only elements of a City Beautiful-inspired plan for downtown Albany actually built. In addition to the railroad, a newspaper occupied the southern wing, built later. Today it serves as the main administration building for the State University of New York.
26	Downtown Albany Historic District	Downtown Albany Historic District	January 31, 1980 (#80002579)	Bound by Broadway, State, Pine, Lodge and Columbia streets, also 145-150 State, 36-42 Eagle, and 93 North Pearl Streets; 42°39′02″N 73°45′08″W	Downtown	Downtown is the oldest settled area of Albany, and still retains the street plan established within its 17th-century stockade. The 13-block core of the city is home to many of its major commercial buildings, some of which are themselves listed on the Register. The district's boundaries were altered on May 9, 2022.
27	First Congregational Church of Albany	First Congregational Church of Albany	May 27, 2014 (#14000259)	405 Quail Street; 42°39′14″N 73°47′09″W	New Scotland/Woodlawn	1917 church built in Wren-Gibbs style was catalyst for development of surrounding neighborhood
28	First Reformed Church	First Reformed Church	January 21, 1974 (#74001214)	56 Orange Street; 42°39′13″N 73°45′02″W	Downtown	The North Dutch Church was architect Philip Hooker's first major design. The congregation was formed in 1634 making it the oldest Christian congregation in Upstate New York.
29	First Trust Company Building	First Trust Company Building	January 18, 1973 (#73001156)	35 State Street; 42°38′57″N 73°45′03″W	Downtown	Marcus T. Reynolds designed this domed Beaux Arts commercial building in 1902. Located on the corner with Broadway, it is one of downtown's several focal points.
30	Fort Orange Archeological Site	Fort Orange Archeological Site	November 4, 1993 (#93001620)	Junction of I-787 and U.S. routes 9 and 20; 42°38′41″N 73°45′01″W	Downtown	The first permanent Dutch fort in New Netherland was located here in 1624. Abandoned by 1676, it became the nucleus of the future city. Archeological digs in 1970 uncovered the first 17th-century European artifacts from an intact Dutch colonial site.
31	Graceland Cemetery Receiving Vault		May 10, 2024 (#100010274)	680 Delaware Avenue; 42°38′07″N 73°47′38″W		
32	James Hall Office	James Hall Office	December 8, 1976 (#76001204)	Lincoln Park; 42°38′45″N 73°46′09″W	South End	A collaboration between Calvert Vaux and Andrew Jackson Downing resulted in this 1852 Italian villa-style building in Lincoln Park. It was used as office and storage space by James Hall, at one time New York's state geologist. His research here laid the foundations for modern North American paleontology.
33	Harmanus Bleecker Library	Harmanus Bleecker Library	May 16, 1996 (#96000559)	19 Dove Street; 42°39′19″N 73°45′42″W	Washington Avenue	This former library is a unique example of Classical Revival architecture from the 1920s in Albany. It was the first building used solely as a library in the city. After sitting vacant following its 1970s closure, it was transformed into office space in 2003.
34	Hook and Ladder No. 4	Hook and Ladder No. 4	March 12, 2001 (#01000247)	Delaware Avenue; 42°38′30″N 73°46′47″W	Delaware Avenue Neighborhood	Another notable work by Albany architect Marcus T. Reynolds, this 1912 brick structure is a rare example of early 20th century Dutch Revival architecture. As well as including a classic stepped gable, the building also features terra cotta sculptures that illustrate Albany's history.
35	Knox Street Historic District	Knox Street Historic District	March 5, 2008 (#08000138)	Knox Street between Madison Avenue and Morris Street; 42°39′12″N 73°46′14″W	Park South	Five separate building campaigns by the same contractor erected the 24 brick rowhouses on these two blocks west of Washington Square in the 1870s and '80s. They are more ornate and accomplished than other such clusters in the city. One Federal style wood frame house from 1838 is also included.
36	Lafayette Park Historic District	Lafayette Park Historic District	November 15, 1978 (#78001837)	Roughly bounded by State, Swan, Elk, Spruce, Chapel and Eagle Streets; 42°39′11″N 73°45′19″W	Downtown	City, county and state government buildings front this downtown park, forming Albany's civic core. Neighboring streets include intact rowhouses that were home to prominent families in the 19th and early 20th centuries.
37	Lil's Diner	Lil's Diner	November 6, 2000 (#00001278)	893 Broadway; 42°39′39″N 73°44′41″W	North Albany	Originally named for its first owner, this is a rare example of an intact railcar-style early 1940s diner design. It underwent significant renovation in 1988 for use as a key set in the movie Ironweed. A neighboring restaurant purchased the location after it closed in 2012 and reopened it as a pizzeria.
38	Lincoln Park	Lincoln Park	February 20, 2018 (#100000890)	Lincoln Park; 42°38′43″N 73°45′50″W	South End	Created by 1890 clearing of Martinville shantytown, park was planned by Charles Downing Lay and Arnold Brunner
39	Lustron Houses of Jermain Street Historic District	Lustron Houses of Jermain Street Historic District	July 29, 2009 (#09000572)	1, 3, 5, 7, 8 Jermain Street; 42°40′45″N 73°48′04″W	Upper Washington Avenue	The five prefabricated Lustron houses on this street are a rare surviving group reflecting the increasing suburbanization of the years after World War II. It is the largest contiguous district in the state with all homes fully intact.
40	Mansion Historic District	Mansion Historic District	September 30, 1982 (#82003343)	Roughly bounded by Park Avenue, Pearl, Eagle, and Hamilton Streets; 42°38′43″N 73°45′28″W	Mansion District	Initially Albany's first suburban enclave, this neighborhood on the slopes below the governor's mansion was the first residence for the city's many immigrant groups during the 19th century.
41	A. Mendelson and Son Company Building	A. Mendelson and Son Company Building	June 6, 2003 (#03000021)	40 Broadway; 42°38′16″N 73°45′14″W		Built after a 1904 fire destroyed the previous structure on the site, this is one of the few remaining intact early-20th-century industrial buildings in Albany's port area. It has seen no significant alterations and remains in use.
42	Walter Merchant House	Walter Merchant House	March 6, 2002 (#02000137)	188 Washington Avenue; 42°39′22″N 73°45′46″W	Washington Avenue	Noted as a rare local example of Italianate architecture in an urban setting, the Merchant House is one of the few of many of this design still standing. Its large carriage house is also increasingly rare in the city. The size of the mansion, in addition to its carriage house, represent the success of the building's first owner, who was one of Albany's wealthy 19th-century merchants.
43	Stephen and Harriet Myers Residence	Stephen and Harriet Myers Residence	November 30, 2004 (#04000999)	194 Livingston Avenue; 42°39′40″N 73°45′16″W	Arbor Hill	Architecturally notable as a rare example of mid-nineteenth-century Greek Revival townhouse design, the building was also prominent in the history of the Underground Railroad. During the 1850s, Stephen Myers was chairman of the Vigilance Committee, a group charged with safely helping African slaves on their way to Canada. The house was the headquarters of the Committee and home to the Myers during Stephen's chairmanship.
44	National Biscuit Company Complex	National Biscuit Company Complex	November 6, 2020 (#100005744)	221-225 North Pearl Street and 75 Livingston Avenue; 42°39′27″N 73°44′58″W		
45	New Scotland Avenue (Troop B) Armory	New Scotland Avenue (Troop B) Armory	January 28, 1994 (#93001536)	130 New Scotland Avenue; 42°39′08″N 73°46′53″W	University Heights	Lewis Pilcher's 1914 Tudor Revival armory is one of only six extant in the state designed for a cavalry unit.
46	New York State Executive Mansion	New York State Executive Mansion	February 18, 1971 (#71000518)	138 Eagle Street; 42°38′48″N 73°45′39″W	Mansion District	Built in 1860 as a private residence, the Governor's home was purchased by the State in 1883 for use as the state's executive mansion. It is the first and only state-owned building dedicated to housing the governor. The Mansion Historic District's name originates from its proximity to the Executive Mansion.
47	New York State Capitol	New York State Capitol	February 18, 1971 (#71000519)	Washington Avenue and State Street; 42°39′09″N 73°45′26″W	Downtown	Commissioned in 1867, the seat of state government was not completed until 1898. During that time, its design was changed from French Renaissance Revival to Beaux Arts. One of twelve U.S. state capitols without a dome, it and Philadelphia's City Hall are the last two large load-bearing structures built in the U.S.
48	New York State Court of Appeals Building	New York State Court of Appeals Building	February 18, 1971 (#71000520)	20 Eagle Street; 42°39′08″N 73°45′14″W	Downtown	Now home to the state's highest court, this was built from 1834 to 1842 to house it and several other state officers. The Greek Revival styling makes free use of all three major classical orders.
49	New York State Department of Education Building	New York State Department of Education Building	March 18, 1971 (#71000521)	89 Washington Avenue; 42°39′14″N 73°45′27″W	Downtown	Henry Hornbostel's 1912 edifice was the first major building in the United States constructed solely for educational administration purposes. Until 1976 it also housed the state museum.
50	Normanskill Farm	Normanskill Farm	April 5, 2019 (#100003625)	5 Mill Road; 42°38′09″N 73°48′07″W	Normansville	Farmstead dating to 1806 has been owned by four prominent city residents; today used as police K-9 training area
51	Nut Grove	Nut Grove	July 30, 1974 (#74001215)	90 McCarty Avenue; 42°38′01″N 73°46′07″W	South End	Alexander Jackson Davis's only Greek Revival house in the Hudson Valley is also a rare example of the Grecian country-house form within the style. After its 1845 construction, it remained in the family until 1903, when it was altered slightly and converted into a hospice, a use that continued until 1973.
52	Old Post Office	Old Post Office	January 20, 1972 (#72000814)	Northeast corner of Broadway and State Street; 42°38′56″N 73°45′01″W	Downtown	Completed in 1883 after four years of construction, in a different style than originally planned this eclectic building was later an anchor for the City Beautiful-inspired Plaza redevelopment that led to the D&H and First Trust buildings.
53	Palace Theatre	Palace Theatre	October 4, 1979 (#79003235)	19 Clinton Avenue; 42°39′17″N 73°45′01″W	Arbor Hill and Downtown	When opened in 1930 it was the third largest theater in the world. John Eberson designed the Austrian Baroque interior considered an excellent example of his atmospheric theatres. Now owned by the city, it was extensively renovated in 2002.
54	Park Mart	Park Mart	May 19, 2021 (#100006516)	93 North Pearl Street; 42°39′10″N 73°45′02″W		Early 1970s parking garage designed to minimize entrance and exit time, with period artwork intact.
55	Pastures Historic District	Pastures Historic District	March 16, 1972 (#72000815)	Bounded on north by Madison Avenue, on east by Green Street, on south by South Ferry Street, on west by South Pearl Street; 42°38′39″N 73°45′16″W	Pastures	At the city's founding, this area south of the stockade was set aside as common pastureland. In the 19th century it was the site of city's first major residential expansion. It is recovering from a controversial urban renewal plan in the late 20th century.
56	Philip Livingston Junior High School	Philip Livingston Junior High School	August 18, 2014 (#14000485)	315 Northern Boulevard; 42°40′06″N 73°45′31″W	West Hill	Colonial Revival school built early in 1930s was city's first large public school building; later hosted controversial appearance by Paul Robeson. Later became a magnet school, now converted into senior apartments.
57	Quackenbush House	Quackenbush House	June 19, 1972 (#72000816)	683 Broadway; 42°39′14″N 73°44′55″W	Downtown	Most likely built in the 1740s—though possibly as early as 1736—the Quackenbush House is the oldest remaining example of Dutch Colonial architecture, which was once characteristic of early Albany. It is the only original house left on the block; the rest were demolished during the construction of the Clinton Avenue exit of Interstate 787. Most recently the building served as an English pub.
58	Quackenbush Pumping Station, Albany Water Works	Quackenbush Pumping Station, Albany Water Works	June 30, 1983 (#83001634)	Quackenbush Square; 42°39′15″N 73°44′51″W	Downtown	In 1873, Albany's rapid growth required the construction of the original buildings of this complex to pump water from the Hudson. It reached its present configuration in 1895, and continued pumping until 1937, with the city's water department continuing to use it as office space. Now the Albany Pump House, a restaurant and brewpub,
59	Rapp Road Community Historic District	Rapp Road Community Historic District	December 27, 2002 (#02001620)	Rapp Road; 42°41′46″N 73°51′12″W	Rapp Road and The Dunes	Originally acquired and subdivided by a local minister, this neighborhood on the city's edge is a rare example of a chain migration African-American community started by migrants from Mississippi during the Great Migration that continues to thrive today.
60	St. Andrew's Episcopal Church	St. Andrew's Episcopal Church	January 7, 2005 (#04001447)	10 North Main Avenue; 42°39′53″N 73°47′18″W	Pine Hills	Architect Norman Sturgis designed this 1930 Anglo-Catholic church to reflect the values of his mentor, Ralph Adams Cram; it remains mostly intact from construction. The congregation, established in 1897, helped pioneer the development of the Pine Hills neighborhood as the city grew. f>
61	St Casimir's Church Complex	St Casimir's Church Complex	January 16, 2018 (#100001964)	309-315, 317, 320 & 324 Sheridan Avenue; 42°39′38″N 73°45′50″W	Sheridan Hollow and West Hill	1896 church, rectory, school and other buildings that served Polish American immigrant community
62	St. Mary's Church	St. Mary's Church	July 14, 1977 (#77000933)	10 Lodge Street; 42°39′06″N 73°45′10″W	Downtown	The Angel of Judgement statue atop the 175-foot (53 m) steeple of this Italianate Romanesque church has been a city landmark ever since its construction in 1867. It is the third church for the oldest Roman Catholic parish in the city and the second oldest in the state.
63	St. Peter's Church	St. Peter's Church	March 16, 1972 (#72000817)	107 State Street; 42°39′03″N 73°45′14″W	Downtown	Richard Upjohn and his son collaborated on this 1860 French Gothic Episcopal Church, considered one of the former's best. George Lord Howe, killed at the Battle of Carillon in 1758, is interred beneath the vestibule. He is the only British peer buried in the United States.
64	Philip Schuyler Mansion	Philip Schuyler Mansion	December 24, 1967 (#67000008)	Clinton and Schuyler Streets; 42°38′29″N 73°45′33″W	Mansion District	Philip Schuyler chose many of the interior furnishings for his house personally while in England, the first full-size Georgian house in the upper Hudson Valley when it was completed in 1764. He lived there for the last forty years of his life, during which he served as a general in the Continental Army, hosting John Burgoyne at the house while he was a prisoner of war, and later as a U.S. Senator. Today it is a state historic site.
65	Selfridge & Langford Building		August 12, 2024 (#100010630)	97-101 Central Avenue; 42°39′35″N 73°45′59″W		
66	South End–Groesbeckville Historic District	South End–Groesbeckville Historic District	September 13, 1984 (#84002062)	Roughly bounded by Elizabeth, 2nd, and Morton Avenues, Pearl and Franklin Streets; 42°38′23″N 73°45′35″W	South End	As Albany industrialized in the mid- and late 19th century, this 26-block neighborhood around the Schuyler Mansion developed rapidly into housing for the workers, mostly immigrants. The area is still associated with the city's German American population.
67	Steamboat Square Historic District		May 4, 2022 (#100007670)	20 Rensselaer, 186-198, 189-205, 200, 202-214, 207-221, 220, 223-237, 230 Green, 58-66 Plum, and 159 Church Streets; 42°38′29″N 73°45′17″W		
68	Ten Broeck Mansion	Ten Broeck Mansion	August 12, 1971 (#71000522)	9 Ten Broeck Place; 42°39′31″N 73°45′04″W	Arbor Hill	This was the home of Abraham Ten Broeck, a member of the colonial Assembly and Continental Congress who served as a local militia officer during the Revolutionary War. It was built in 1797 while he was mayor. Later it was used as a school; since 1948 it has been a historic house museum.
69	United States Post Office, Court House, and Custom House	United States Post Office, Court House, and Custom House	February 28, 2020 (#100005000)	445 Broadway; 42°38′59″N 73°45′00″W	Downtown	1934 Art Deco federal building by Electus D. Litchfield that houses federal court for Northern District of New York
70	United Traction Company Building	United Traction Company Building	May 24, 1976 (#76001205)	598 Broadway; 42°39′08″N 73°44′59″W	Downtown	Marcus Reynolds' 1899 Italian Renaissance Revival building was the headquarters of Albany's trolley company through the 1950s, when it was merged into the Capital District Transportation Authority. It was an architectural counterpart to Union Station across the street that served, along with it, as the gateway to the city for many visitors.
71	The University Club of Albany	The University Club of Albany	May 11, 2011 (#11000268)	141 Washington Avenue; 42°39′21″N 73°45′40″W	Washington Avenue	Adapted from the remnants of a burnt Queen Anne mansion, this 1924 structure is local architect Albert Fuller's last significant work.
72	USS Slater (Destroyer Escort)	USS Slater (Destroyer Escort)	May 7, 1998 (#98000393)	42°38′33″N 73°44′59″W		The Slater, a Cannon-class destroyer escort, is the only one still afloat in the U.S. After serving in the Atlantic during the last years of World War II, she was later sold to the Greek Navy and rechristened the Aetos. Her 40 years of service there included use as a set in The Guns of Navarone and other films. After being decommissioned in 1994, she was eventually relocated to Albany for her current use as a museum ship.
73	Van Ostrande–Radliff House	Van Ostrande–Radliff House	January 10, 2008 (#07000291)	48 Hudson Avenue; 42°38′51″N 73°45′07″W	Downtown	Records discovered in the early 21st century confirmed, along with dendrochronological analysis, that the oldest portion of this small downtown structure was erected in 1728, making it the oldest extant building in Albany, even after modifications in the early 19th century and later additions. Many of its original Dutch Colonial structural elements survive, including the only anchor beam framing for a jambless fireplace known to exist in the U.S. The site also has archeological potential.
74	Washington Avenue (Tenth Battalion) Armory	Washington Avenue (Tenth Battalion) Armory	March 2, 1995 (#95000077)	195 Washington Avenue; 42°39′26″N 73°45′45″W	Washington Avenue	Isaac Perry's 1890 building for the city's National Guard unit was his first to use many of the fortress-like elements and materials that distinguish his later armories around the state. Today it is used as a sports and concert venue.
75	Washington Avenue Corridor Historic District	Washington Avenue Corridor Historic District	November 27, 2019 (#100004669)	Generally Central, Washington & Western Avenues; 42°39′38″N 73°46′11″W		Many well-preserved, architecturally diverse buildings from late 19th to late 20th centuries.
76	Washington Park Historic District	Washington Park Historic District	June 19, 1972 (#72000818)	Washington Park and surrounding properties 42°39′23″N 73°46′12″W		Albany's largest historic district consists of its largest park and the streets around it. The former, praised as one of America's most important, was built in 1869 on land reserved for public purposes since the city's founding; the latter include fashionable residences built by Stanford White and H.H. Richardson. Boundary increased in 2015.
77	Whipple Cast and Wrought Iron Bowstring Truss Bridge	Whipple Cast and Wrought Iron Bowstring Truss Bridge	March 18, 1971 (#71000523)	1000 Delaware Avenue; 42°38′09″N 73°48′02″W	Normansville	This Whipple-style bridge is one of the oldest remaining iron bridges in the United States. Whipple bridges were noted for their ease of fabrication, light weight, and low cost. Originally part of the Delaware Turnpike, the bridge has been owned is located at the Normanskill Farm owned by the city of Albany.
78	Young Men's Christian Association Building	Young Men's Christian Association Building	November 2, 1978 (#78001838)	60–64 North Pearl Street; 42°39′06″N 73°45′05″W	Downtown	Considered a fine urban example of the Romanesque Revival style, this 1886 building had the first gymnasium in upstate New York and one of the first indoor swimming pools in the country. Six years later, it hosted the first basketball game played away from Springfield College, the sport's birthplace.

== Former listings ==
	Name on the Register	Image	Date listed	Date removed	Location	Description
1	Knickerbocker and Arnink Garages	Knickerbocker and Arnink Garages	November 28, 1980 (#80002580)	May 30, 1989	72–74 Hudson Avenue; 42°38′51″N 73°45′10″W	These two Cast stone neo-Gothic buildings from 1915 and 1927 were among the first buildings in the city specifically built for automobiles.
2	Dr. Hun Houses	Dr. Hun Houses	September 21, 1972 (#72001587)	December 11, 1972	149 and 149 1/2 Washington Avenue; 42°39′21″N 73°45′41″W	The two houses were built a century apart; the older one, built in 1820s, was one of the finest Federal style houses in city. For many years they were the residence and business address of physician Henry Hun and his family.

== See also ==
- History of Albany, New York
- National Register of Historic Places listings in Albany County, New York
- National Register of Historic Places in New York
