= Knickerbocker and Arnink Garages =

- Formerly listed on the U.S. National Register of Historic Places
- North (front) elevation of garages ca. 1980

- Location within New York
- Location: Albany, NY
- Coordinates: 42°38′51″N 73°45′10″W
- Area: 0.75 acres (3,000 m^{2})
- Built: 1915 (Arnink), 1927 (Knickerbocker)
- Architect: J. Walter Montross
- Architectural style: Neo-Gothic
- Demolished: 1989
- NRHP reference No.: 80002580

Significant dates
- Added to NRHP: November 28, 1980
- Removed from NRHP: May 30, 1989

The Knickerbocker and Arnink Garages were two attached stone buildings located on Hudson Avenue in central Albany, New York, United States. Both were built in the early 20th century; the Knickerbocker garage was added to the Arnink garage 12 years after it was built. In 1980, they were listed on the National Register of Historic Places; nine years later they were both demolished and delisted.

At the time, many garages were adapted from stables or carriage houses. The first to be built, the smaller, was instead adapted from an existing commercial building by the owner of a successful Ford dealership in the city for his car-rental and repair service. His superintendent later bought the business from him and had the larger one built in the same style by the same architect.

They were among the earliest structures in Albany built specifically in response to the increasing use of the automobile at that time. Their neo-Gothic cast stone facades are an unusual choice of style and material for that time. They may have been inspired by the nearby Delaware and Hudson Railroad office building, a contemporary catalyst for the redevelopment of downtown that is today the system administration building for the State University of New York.

One was later converted into a warehouse and used for that purpose until its demolition. That came about as part of a plan for two large office towers proposed for the neighborhood as redevelopment. Nothing has been built on the space since; it is used as part of a parking lot that serves another nearby redevelopment project, the Times Union Center.

== Buildings ==
The two garages were located on the south side of downtown Albany in a 0.75 acres (3,000 m^{2}) lot on the south side of Hudson Avenue, midway between South Pearl Street (New York State Route 32) and Green Street. The terrain is generally flat and the Hudson River lies 500 feet (150 m) to the east. Today the land is, along with everything east to Green, a parking lot. The buildings of the Downtown Albany Historic District, including the city's oldest building 48 Hudson Avenue, are two blocks to the north and east. An 18-story office tower is located on the west.

Across the street is a large parking garage serving the Times Union Center arena and another old, commercial building to the northwest at the corner of Hudson Avenue and South Pearl Street. The arena is across South Pearl Street. To the south, just beyond Division Street, is the elevated South Mall Arterial, which leads from nearby Interstate 787 at the Dunn Memorial Bridge to the parking areas under Empire State Plaza.

Both buildings used a structural system of steel framing and reinforced concrete. The exteriors were brick faced in cast stone. The Knickerbocker, at 72 Hudson Avenue, was four stories tall; the Arnink's was three stories; both buildings were three bays wide and had flat-roofs. Different materials in the composite for the cast stone meant the Knickerbocker had distinct golden hue that resembled the color of sandstone while the Arnink was granite gray.

The upper fenestration of both garages was similar. The Knickerbocker's street entrance was a single, wide, pointed arch stretching across all three bays with separate entrances. Its window spandrels had decorative touches that were intended to mimic Gothic tracery. On the Arnink, every bay had a separate garage; the western one was slightly larger and each garage had a pointed-arch entrance with an original folding door and a metal lantern-style light above. Above it was a frieze that bore the inscription "Arnink Garage 1915" carved into the cast stone.

The garages were set with casement windows that continued with the large, pointed-arch windows in the upper stories. Between them the tracery continued. At the top of the Arnink were cast-stone finials shaped like bells.

At the time they were listed on the Register, the Knickerbocker was used a Hertz rental-car location and a vertical, illuminated sign with the company name was affixed to the facade. This was the only significant modification to either building during their lifetimes.

== History ==
In 1914, a downtown redevelopment plan based on City Beautiful movement principles led to the construction of the Delaware and Hudson Railroad's (D&H) new headquarters, today the State University of New York (SUNY) System Administration Building. The Flemish Gothic edifice by local architect Marcus T. Reynolds, closely copied from the Cloth Hall in Ypres, Belgium, was meant to be a focal point for traffic coming down from Capitol Hill to the west via State Street. To further this goal, the industrial structures along the riverfront behind it were demolished.

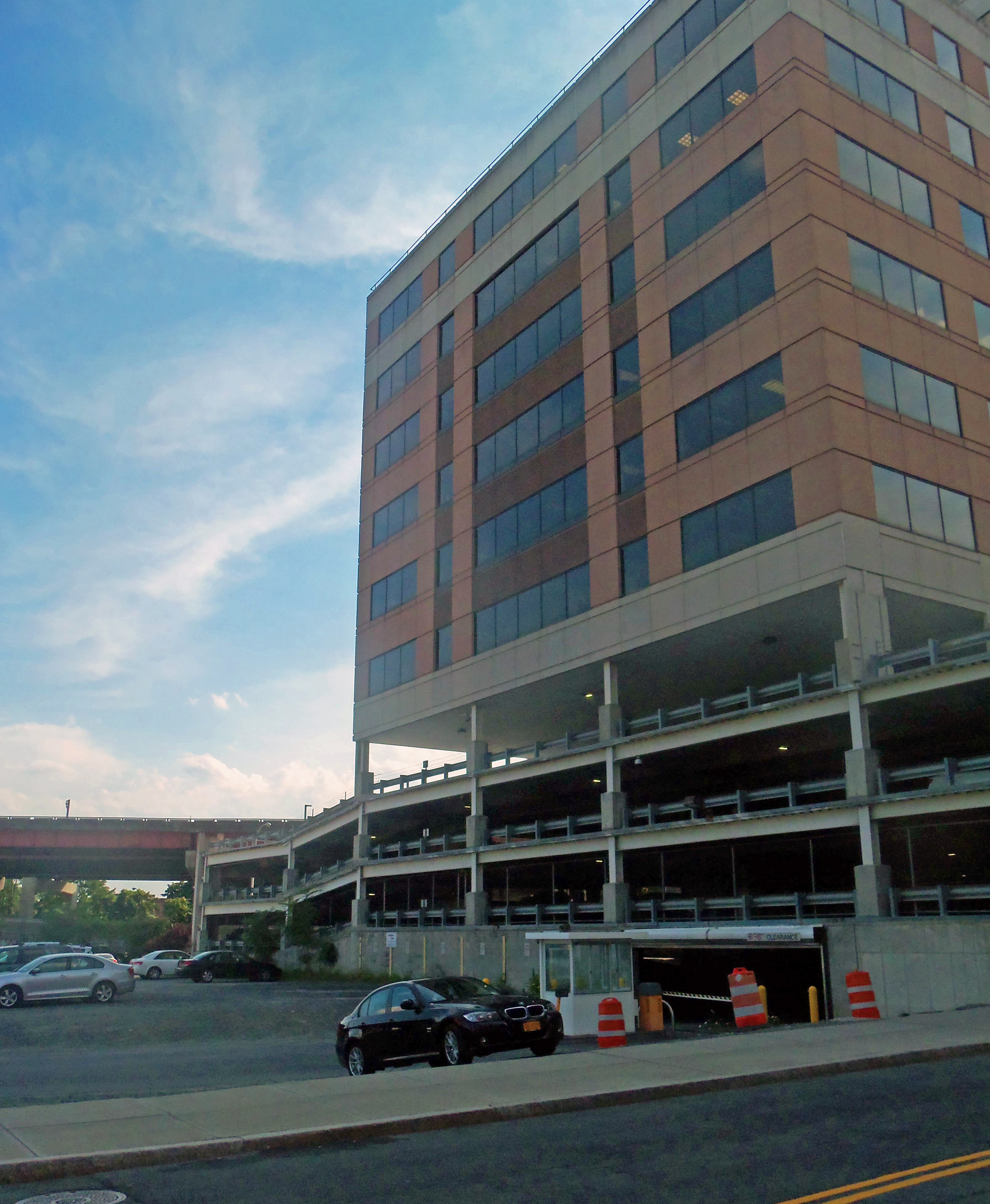
Site of the garages in 2013

The new building drew much praise, and local merchants and businessmen were inspired to emulate it in their own. Henry Arnink, a local dealer of Ford Model T's, had expanded his business to include repair and rental services by that time. He bought the existing three-story structure at 74 Hudson and renovated and expanded it. Local architect J. Walter Montross oversaw the project, designing a cast stone Gothic exterior that may have been intended to echo the nearby D&H Building.

Twelve years after Arnink moved into the new building he sold the business to his superintendent, Harry Knickerbocker. Wanting to expand the business, Knickerbocker again commissioned Montross. The second garage was similar to the first in decoration and overall form, save for an extra story at the top. It differed in its wide single garage at the street level with no text and lacked the roofline finials.

In 1947 Knickerbocker sold the Arnink garage to another concern, which converted it into a warehouse. Both buildings were still in use for those businesses at the time they were listed on the Register three decades later. Knickerbocker had by then become a franchisee of the Hertz car-rental chain, which necessitated placing a large series of illuminated signs with that company's name letter by letter down the two stories above the garage, between the eastern bays. That would be the only significant change made to either building following their construction.

By the late 1980s the neighborhood had changed. Another Register-listed property nearby, the Abrams Building, had been demolished to clear the way for a new arena, now known as the Times Union Center. In 1988 plans for two large office towers at the corner of South Pearl and Hudson were approved by the city. While the two garages did not overlap the new buildings' footprint, it was necessary to demolish them anyway to provide enough parking. That was accomplished in early 1989; they were delisted a month later.

== See also ==
- National Register of Historic Places listings in Albany, New York
