= Church of the Holy Innocents (Albany, New York) =

Historic church in New York, United States

- U.S. National Register of Historic Places
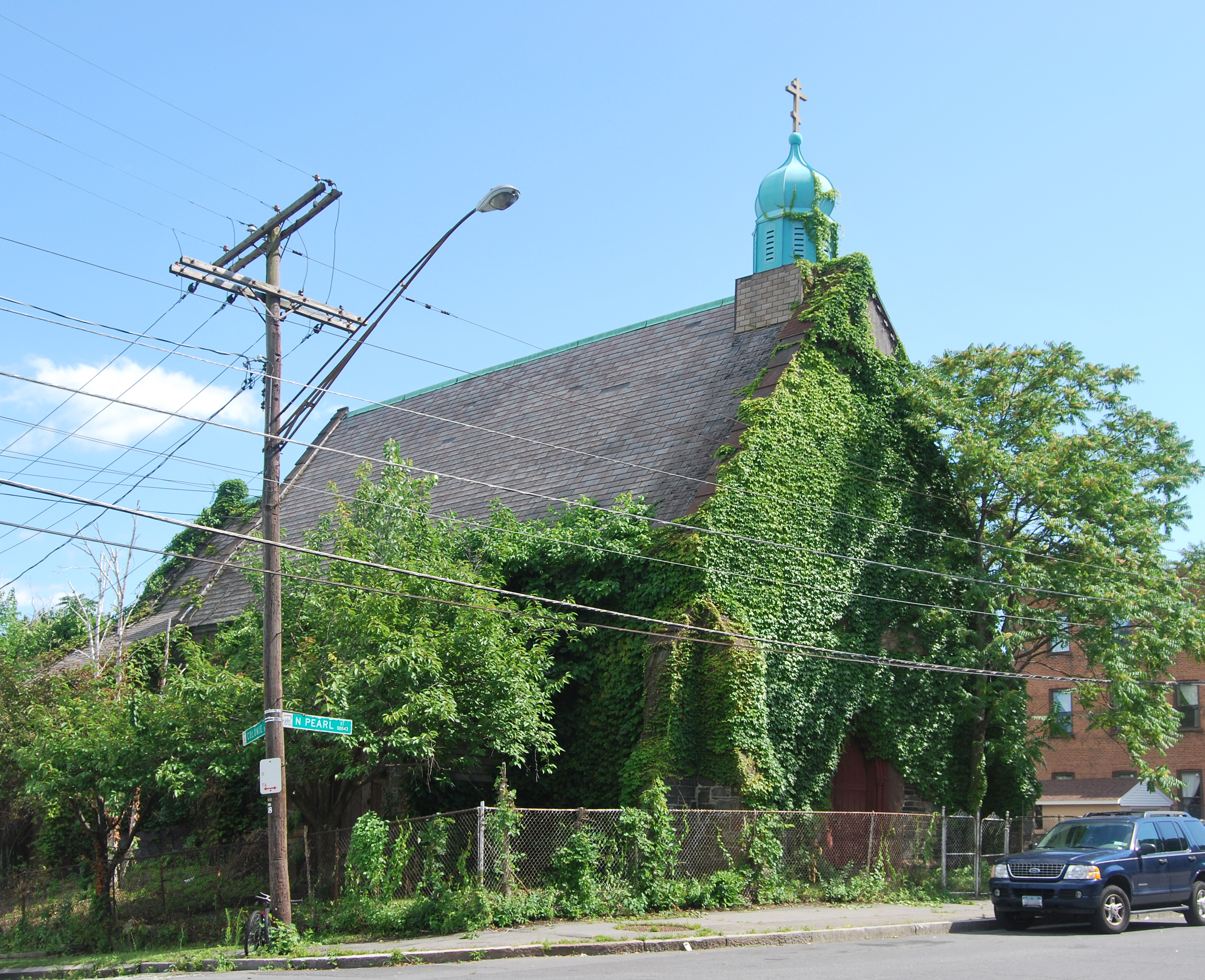
- North profile and east elevation, 2011

- Location within New York Location within the United States
- Location: Albany, NY
- Coordinates: 42°39′31″N 73°44′54″W
- Area: less than one acre
- Built: 1850
- Architect: Frank Wills; Wollett & Ogden
- Architectural style: Gothic Revival
- NRHP reference No.: 78001836
- Added to NRHP: January 31, 1978

The former Church of the Holy Innocents, later known as Church of the Nativity of our Virgin Lady, was originally an Episcopal church located on North Pearl Street (New York State Route 32) in Albany, New York, United States. It and an adjacent chapel were built in the mid-19th century in an early Gothic Revival style designed by Frank Wills. It was listed on the National Register of Historic Places in 1978.

A small garden surrounding the church and chapel gives it the feel of an English country parish church despite its urban surroundings. Its interior has several stained glass windows designed by John Bolton, brother of William Jay Bolton. A century after its construction the Episcopal congregation moved to a newer church and sold it to a Russian Orthodox church, which renamed it and added an onion dome. They have subsequently moved out and the building remains vacant.

== Building ==
The church and chapel complex is located at the southeast corner of the intersection of North Pearl and Colonie Street, roughly one half-mile (1 km) north of downtown Albany and a few blocks east of the Arbor Hill neighborhood. It is located at the point where the terrain, flat all the way to the Hudson River one-quarter mile (500 m) away, starts rising to the west, creating a dropoff at the east end of the property. The surrounding neighborhood is mostly residential, showing the varied effects of past urban renewal programs.

Across Colonie, to the north, is a large vacant lot and the tracks of Amtrak's Empire Corridor, which runs between New York City and Niagara Falls. To the south are some other older commercial and residential buildings. A pair of modern high-rise apartment buildings, with a complex of small, newer ones to their north, are across North Pearl to the west.

Some other properties listed on the Register are nearby. The small Broadway–Livingston Avenue Historic District, is to the east and southeast, with the Broadway Row a block to the south of it. A block to the southwest is the northern end of the Arbor Hill Historic District–Ten Broeck Triangle and one of its contributing properties, Ten Broeck Mansion.

The church and chapel are connected by a small hyphen. Both buildings are T-shaped 2 1/2-story structures built of coursed rubble masonry. They are trimmed in Portland stone and topped by steeply pitched slate covered gable roofs. The main church building is currently covered with ivy, obscuring the view of most of its decorative features. At the top of the front is a green onion dome topped with an Orthodox cross.

Underneath that vegetation on the west (front) facade are heavy corner buttresses, an arched central entrance, four lancet windows on the second story and a single triangular window in the gable. The nave is five bays long, with an additional entrance at the northeast. A smaller projecting gable on the east with two small shed-roofed wings is the chancel.

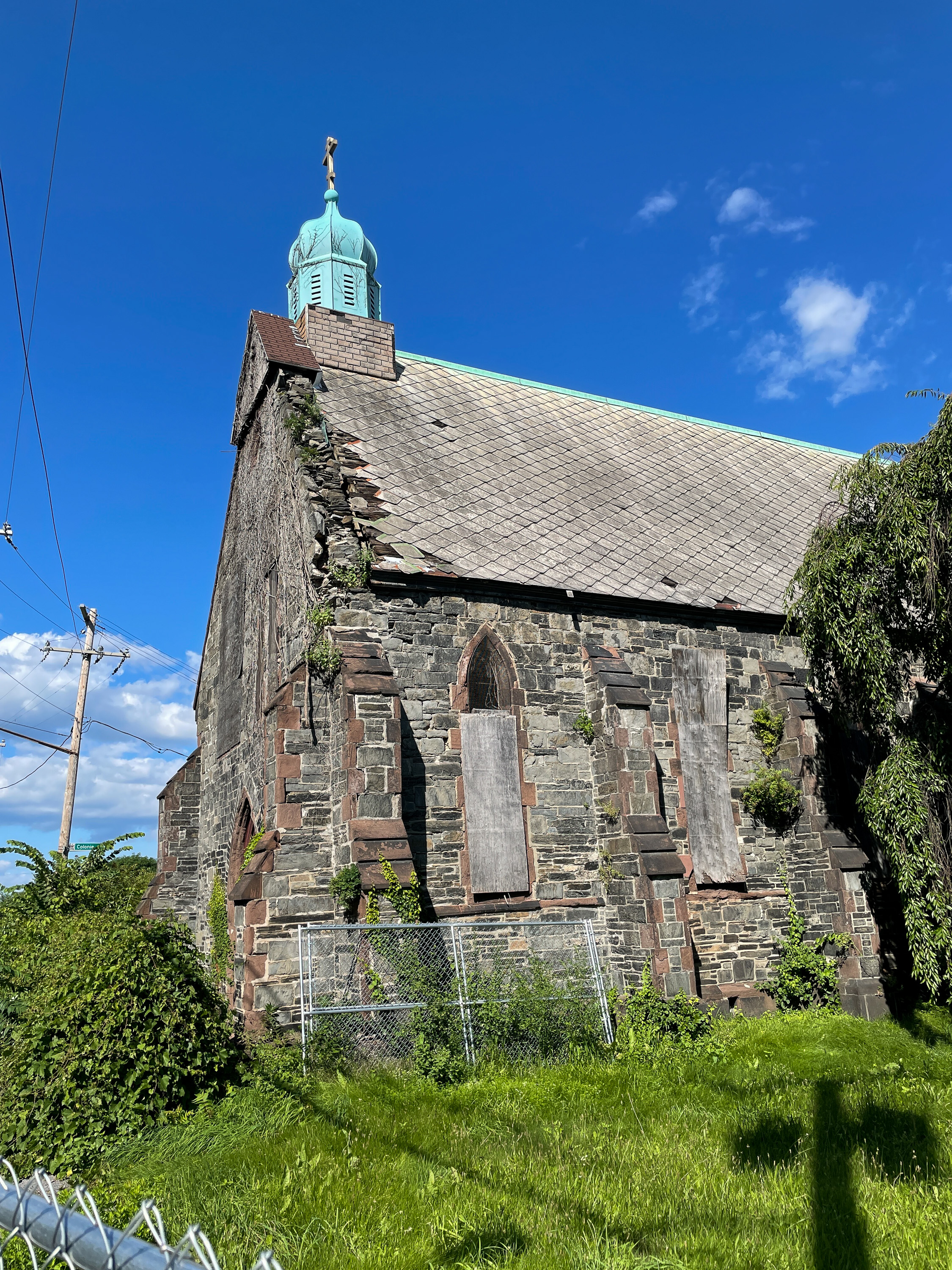
The crumbling church in 2021

Inside the church's decor is restrained. Wooden wainscoting runs along the lower portion of the walls. Above there is a small wooden gallery and a beamed ceiling. The original pews have been removed and chairs line the sides. Screens and icons block the view of the altar. A modern counter is next to the entrance. The stained glass and grisaille windows remain.

The chapel is a similar, smaller building. The dropoff in the terrain exposes its brick basement in the rear. The wall above it is also brick. Inside, it too has partitions, screens and icons, but it has been extensively renovated. The floor is linoleum and the ceiling has had skylights added.

On May 4, 2015, a section of the church collapsed. In December 2016 a developer purchased the church, saving it from possible demolition. The developer reportedly planned to stabilize the structure and eventually open it as a community center or restaurant. In 2019, as no renovations appeared to have taken place, the Historic Albany Foundation placed it on their “Dirty Dozen” list of Albany’s most endangered historic structures.

== See also ==
- National Register of Historic Places listings in Albany, New York
