= Emmaus United Methodist Church =

Historic church in New York, United States

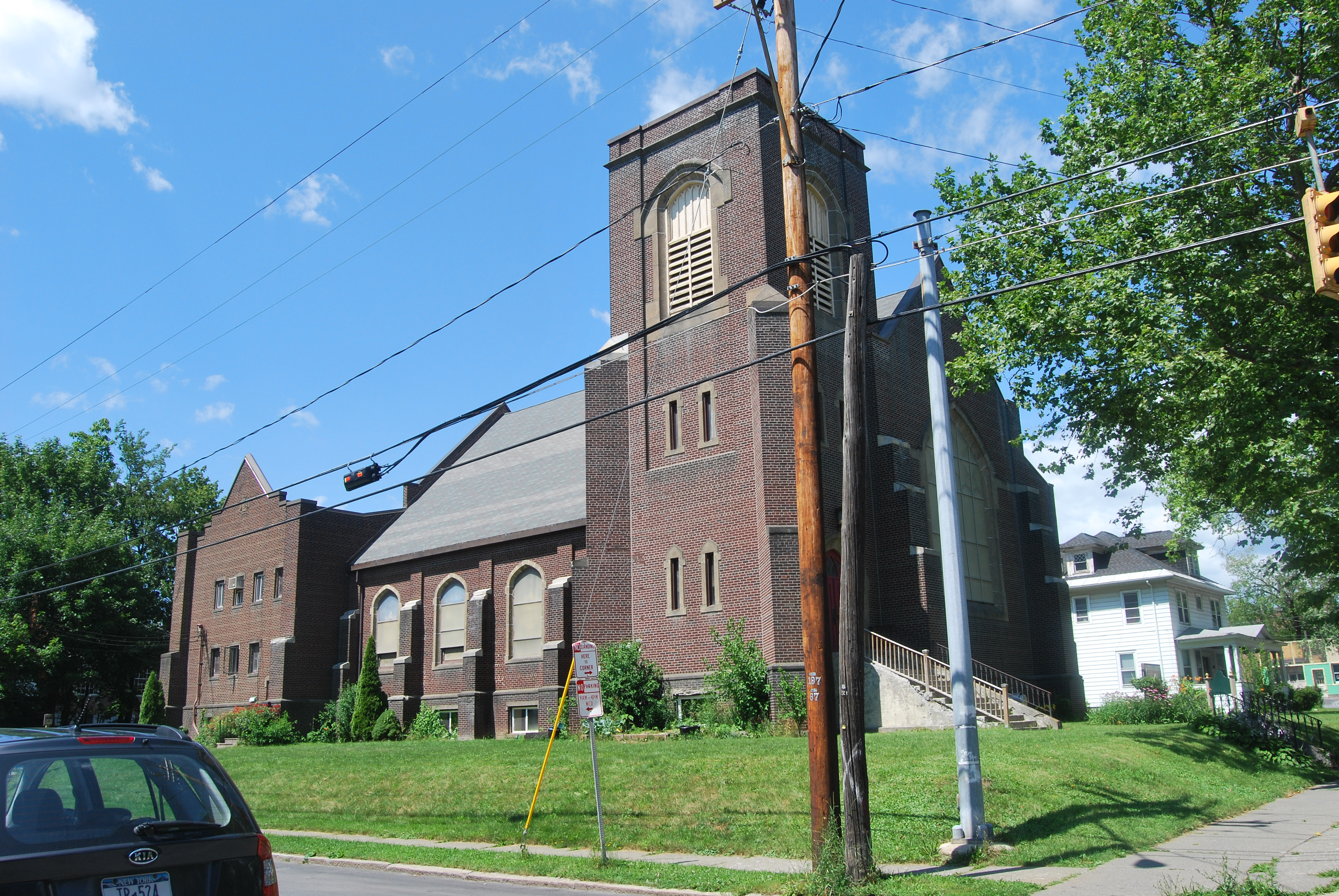
- South profile and east elevation, 2011

Religion
- Affiliation: Methodism (UMC)
- Leadership: The Rev. G. Ewart Morris

Location
- Location: Albany, NY, USA
- Interactive map of Emmaus United Methodist Church
- Coordinates: 42°39′53″N 73°47′30″W

Architecture
- Style: Collegiate Gothic
- Completed: 1914

Specifications
- Direction of façade: east
- Materials: Brick, stone

U.S. National Register of Historic Places
- Added to NRHP: February 28, 2008
- NRHP Reference no.: 08000094

Website
- Emmaus United Methodist Church

Emmaus United Methodist Church, originally built as Calvary Methodist Episcopal Church, two of five names it has gone by in its existence, is located at Morris and West Lawrence streets in Albany, New York, United States. It is a brick Collegiate Gothic building constructed in the early 20th century. In 2008 it was listed on the National Register of Historic Places.

Calvary was the successor to another Methodist church that had met for years in Albany's Mansion neighborhood closer to the city's historic core. The church's members were forced to move in 1912 when the city acquired its land to build a new school. They found a new site in the developing Pine Hills neighborhood in the western areas the city, where streetcar lines had just been extended. The church helped establish the new suburban neighborhood, providing it with a center and focal point after the original developer went bankrupt.

The building remains largely intact. Later the congregation merged with another church, St. Luke's. In 1994 they merged again with another Pine Hills Methodist church and took their current name. In the early 2000s the church developed an extensive program for helping refugees and immigrants from Africa and Asia resettle in the Albany area.

== Buildings and grounds ==
The church is located on the northwest corner of the intersection, two blocks south of Madison Avenue (U.S. Route 20). To the north and west are similarly large commercial and institutional buildings. Across North Lawrence to the east is a large parking lot and some pad site commercial buildings. South of the church, across Morris, are several blocks of large late 19th- and early 20th-century one- and two-family homes. It occupies the entire lot between Morris and Yates streets, at the edge of a small commercial area, along with a parsonage that is not considered a contributing resource to the National Register listing. Most of the lot has been cleared, though some tall mature shade trees remain along the western bound.

=== Exterior ===
At the south end of the lot is the main building. It is a one-story brick structure on a high, exposed basement. Atop is a tall, steep gabled roof with a parapet. A three-story bell tower is attached to the southeastern corner. On the west (rear) is the parish hall, a gabled structure perpendicular to the main block.

Below the water table the brick is laid in common bond; above it is switches to English bond, with the header course every sixth row. Buttresses with stone trim divide the bays, four on the north facade and five on the south. Each bay has a Gothic-arched stained-glass window with stone surround.

Two larger buttresses on the east (front) flank the tall five-part stained glass window in a pointed arch. A small rectangular window is on the north side. Concrete steps with a brick facing lead up from the sidewalk on the south corner to the main entrance just north of the tower.

The parish hall wing has a similar treatment as the main block. Some of its rectangular casement windows have stained glass. They and the wooden doors are mostly original.

Two large buttresses project at 45-degree angles from the corners of the bell tower. A pair of narrow rectangular windows with stone trim are on the south face of the tower at the first story. Similar windows are on both the south and east of the second story, inside a slightly recessed area that also includes the arched louvered vents around the bells, again with stone trim. Above them, at the tower's flat roof, is a stone belt course and plain parapet.

=== Interior ===
A stone architrave similar to the other door and window surrounds surmounts the original paired wooden doors at the main entrance. They have their original iron hinges and transom with wooden tracery. They open into a vestibule on the first floor of the bell tower, which in turn opens into the sanctuary.

It has beadboard wainscoting and walls of exposed brick, which will eventually be covered with fresh plaster or drywall. On the ceiling are dark wooden planks supported by hammerbeams. The pews are arranged in a gentle arc with center and side aisles.

At the rear (west) wall are doors at either end of the side aisles. One leads to the choir space, the other to the parish hall wing. Its interior has a large central parlor with smaller rooms around it used for classrooms and meetings, as well as bathrooms and closets. They are mostly finished in their original plaster. The basement of the main block similarly is a large central space surrounded by smaller rooms.

== History ==
The church began as the Ferry Street Methodist Episcopal Church. It eventually moved to Trinity Place and Westerlo Street in what is now Albany's Mansion neighborhood, south of downtown. At that point it became the Ashgrove Methodist Episcopal Church, building there in 1863 on the site of a former mansion.

Across the street from the church was Public School 14. In 1912 the city decided to build a new school building, and chose the land occupied by Ashgrove. The church decided to move to a new location, with the section of Westerlo west of the intersection renamed Ashgrove Place in its honor.

In looking for a new location, the church followed general trends of Albany's population and development at that time. From the city's founding by the Dutch in the late 17th century to the Civil War a half-century earlier, it had remained within an area one mile (1.6 km) west of the Hudson River and two (3.2 km) along it, the area still the city's core. The development of horsecar lines had allowed the population to settle in undeveloped areas. In 1890, those were upgraded to electric streetcar lines, and extended further.

One such extension was along Madison Avenue. The Albany Land Improvement Company was founded the same year to subdivide a large parcel around the junction of Madison and what is today Western Avenue, the eastern end of the First Great Western Turnpike, a toll road built almost a century earlier. It named the area Pine Hills.

The company failed after two years, but construction continued. St. Andrew's Episcopal Church, two blocks away, was started in the area from central Albany in 1897 as a mission church. Along with the new Calvary Methodist Episcopal Church, its building larger than that had previously been housed in, were institutions that stabilized the growing suburban neighborhood. In 1994, the church, already merged with another Pine Hills congregation, merged again with another one and renamed itself again as Emmaus United Methodist Church, after the village where Jesus appeared to two of his disciples after his resurrection.

== Beliefs and programs ==
Emmaus believes in "God's action in our lives and our community". It therefore says members "must live open to faith, not trapped by worldliness". Active participation in, and service to, both the church community and the outside community is strongly encouraged.

The church is particularly known for its services to African and other refugees in the Albany area. In 2007 it was selected by the U.S. Committee for Refugees and Immigrants to host 17 survivors of the 2004 massacre of Banyamulenge people at the Gatumba refugee camp in Burundi. "We fell in love with them," said Denise Stringer, pastor at the time. The refugees found the church community, and Albany, welcoming and healing. That summer they organized a memorial ceremony in Voorheesville, west of Albany, for all the Gatumba survivors who were resettled in the United States.

Out of that experience the church founded Refugee and Immigrant Support Services – Emmaus (RISSE). It serves new arrivals from other countries and cultures with programs such as English-language instruction, liaison with human-services agencies, child care and paperwork support. Since its founding the program has grown to include immigrants from Asia as well. "Emmaus is now a multi-language, multi-cultural congregation", said The Rev. Holly Nye, immediate past pastor, in 2009.

Other church programs include a youth ministry and food pantry.

== See also ==
- National Register of Historic Places listings in Albany, New York
