= Knox Street Historic District =

Historic district in New York, United States

- U.S. National Register of Historic Places
- U.S. Historic district
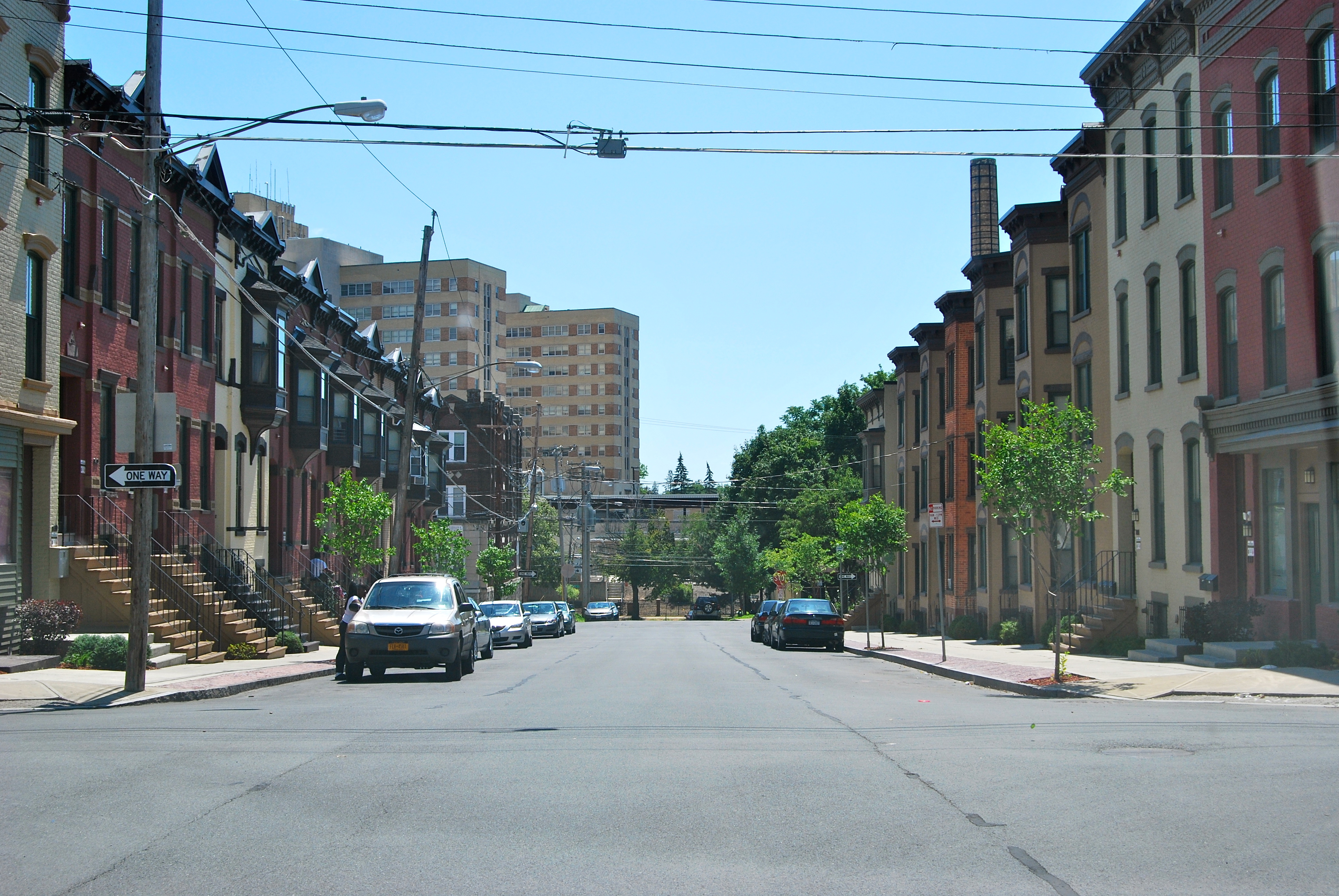
- View south along street showing 142–158 Knox (left) and 143–153 Knox (right), 2011

- Location within New York Location within the United States
- Location: Albany, New York
- Coordinates: 42°39′11.26″N 73°46′14.1″W
- Area: 0.8 acres (3,200 m^{2})
- Built: 1838, 1870s–80s
- Architect: Walsh, John & Edmund
- Architectural style: Italianate, Queen Anne
- NRHP reference No.: 08000138
- Added to NRHP: March 5, 2008

The Knox Street Historic District is primarily located along one block of that street in the Park South neighborhood of Albany, New York, United States. Its contributing properties are several groups of attached rowhouses. The area was recognized as a historic district and listed on the National Register of Historic Places in 2008.

For most of the first half of the 19th century, the block of Knox that comprises most of the district was either undeveloped or used as a nursery by Scottish-born James Wilson, breeder of one of the early American-bred commercial strains of strawberry. His 1830s Federal style house on Morris Street is a contributing property, the oldest in the district and one of the oldest in Park South. The nursery remained in operation in some capacity into the early 20th century under different ownership.

Most of the rowhouses were built in the 1870s and -80s, probably by the same builder, as they are a more cohesive group than other clusters of rowhouses in Park South. They also include a set with corbelled brick and projecting bays, both unusual architectural features for Albany rowhouses. All buildings in the district are brick; only two are detached houses. The rehabilitation of the properties, which had fallen into disrepair, won an award from the state Office of Parks, Recreation and Historic Preservation in 2009.

== Geography ==
The district includes both sides of Knox between Dana Avenue and Morris Street, the row on the west side north of Dana, and 74 Morris Street. Its boundary strictly adheres to those property lines. This forms a rectangle with smaller, roughly identical rectangles projecting from its northwest and southwest corners. Within this 0.8-acre (3,200 m^{2}) area are 24 buildings, all considered contributing to the district's historic character. The lot where a house once stood at the southwest corner of Knox and Morris has been converted into a small city park, the district's only open space.

To the east and west are blocks with similarly dense urban development—likewise mostly rowhouses, though not always as architecturally consistent as those within the district. Properties to the north along Madison Avenue (U.S. Route 20) are part of the neighboring Washington Park Historic District. One block to the east, along Dana and Morris, is Lark Street, the western boundary of the Center Square/Hudson–Park Historic District. Just past Myrtle Avenue, one block south of the district, is the Samuel S. Stratton Veterans Administration hospital, part of a large complex of healthcare facilities. Taller than its neighboring structures, it serves as a focal point when looking south along Knox.

== Buildings ==
Except where otherwise stated, all the buildings in the district are attached brick rowhouses. None are currently listed individually on the Register.

- 131–135 Knox Street: Located at the north end of the district, these three date to 1875, shortly after Washington Park was opened. Built on 21-by-66-foot (6.4 by 20.1 m) lots, they are in the Italianate style, three bays wide with raised basements. Two-over-two double-hung sash windows on the east (front) facades have ornate cast iron sills and lintels with intricate Italianate detailing. At the rooflines are articulated projecting modillioned wooden cornices. Wooden steps with iron railings climb to a recessed entrance in the right bay of each, topped by a projecting square wooden oriel window.
- 137 Knox Street: One of the two free-standing houses in the district, this was built slightly later than its northern neighbors, in 1876. Its lot is three feet (1 m) deeper than theirs. It has a cross-gabled roof and a street-level ground floor. Its windows, which may have been altered at some point, and door have similar lintels. The three first-floor windows, double-hung six-over-one sash that may reflect an early 20th-century alteration, are located on a small projecting bay with clapboard siding. The roof lacks the broad overhanging eaves, making this more of a rural-style house within the overall Italianate mode.
- 139, 140 and 141 Knox Street: Located on opposite sides of the street just south of Dana, these three are three-story, flat-fronted buildings of three bays each. The ground floors of 139 and 140 reflect their original purpose as storefronts; on 140 it is now faced in clapboard. The storefront cornices have survived conversion to residential use. On all three buildings, the two-over-two sash has hoods, but the material and/or design are different on each. At the roofline is the ornate wooden cornice characteristic of the Italianate style, but 139 and 140 have it only on the facades facing Knox and not Dana.
- 142–158 Knox Street: This row takes up the remainder of the space along the east side of Knox between Dana and Morris. They were built in the mid-1880s and reflect aspects of the Romanesque Revival and Queen Anne styles on their basic Italianate forms. Belt courses delineate the floors within the buildings, and the windows and doors are topped with articulated or segmental forms. At the roofline there is a patterned brickwork frieze and the cornice is held up with large brackets; both are typical of the Queen Anne Style. Atop each is a centrally located pediment. The houses from 146 to 158 also have an oriel in the southernmost second-story bay, above the main entrance and wooden stoop.
- 143–153 Knox Street: Across the street, this row likewise occupies the majority of the block on its side. Built around the same time, these reflect a stronger Romanesque influence on the Italianate form. On all these, one of the two bays is projecting, with double windows on the facet facing the street. All windows on the facade are one-over-one sash with brownstone sills and lintels. A segmental arch of splayed bricks tops the double windows on the street facet of the bay. Stoops are lower than other houses on the street, and lead to recessed double doors with a brownstone lintel. The cornice at the roof has a corbel at the south corner.
- 155 Knox Street: Built in 1882, a few years before the rest of the street, this corner building lacks the projecting bay of its neighbors. More strictly Italianate, it has some of the same features as the row across the street, such as the projecting second-story bay (square in its case, with double one-over-one) and paint giving the appearance of belt courses. The main entry is similarly double doors in a recessed segmental archway. On the exposed basement the windows have external bars.
- 74 Morris Street: The oldest property in the district, and one of the oldest in Park South, this Federal style two-story, three-bay almost square side-gabled house dates to 1838. It has a deeper setback than its newer neighbors to the west; the front yard has been entirely paved over to serve as parking. The main entrance is on the east side, under a hip-roofed porch with six-over-six sash and a gabled hood over the door. All other windows are one-over-one; the east bay on the second story is blind. On top, the original slate and copper roof is pierced by several modern ventilation and heating pipes.

== History ==
For the first half of the 19th century the area that would become the Knox Street Historic District was either undeveloped or used as a strawberry farm, with the block itself existing only as a paper street to actually be opened once the city had expanded to need housing there. When it did, development was rapid, although the original agricultural use remained in part through the early 20th century. The neighborhood's decline during the later years of the century has been reversed with an award-winning project in the early 21st.

=== 1813–1874: Strawberry nursery ===
Knox Street first appeared on maps of Albany in 1813, with building lots already subdivided; however those were merely planning maps as the city had at the time not grown far from its original downtown, its core since it was first established by the Dutch as a colonial capital in the 17th century. As such Knox, like many of the other streets in what is now Park South, existed purely on paper. The only street in the area was Madison Avenue, then known as Lydius Avenue. The future site of Washington Park existed, but was not used as a park at the time, instead merely serving as a parade ground and site for special events like the county fair. At the time the only area with any kind of use was a cemetery built in 1806.

From several different early owners, the land that today forms the district eventually passed to James Wilson, and the east–west streets were built. The city's property tax records show his house, the one at 74 Morris, for the first time in 1838, along with an accompanying barn, on three acres (1.2 ha) where he had built greenhouses three years before. He had used what the city considered waste land, due to the slope created by nearby Beaver Creek, to build a nursery where he developed and grew the Wilson strawberry, the first successful American cultivar of that fruit, as rich and juicy as various European blends but able to withstand the American climate. For the next 40 years his breed would dominate American strawberry markets.

For the next 30 years, as well, there would be no other houses south of Lydius, which finally became Madison Avenue in 1867. The only other properties in the area in use were an almshouse from 1826 and a prison, in 1846. Both of these suggested, along with the pre-existing uses, that the area was far enough from the city center for undesirable but necessary businesses and institutions to be allowed.

In the 1830s Albany's city directories had begun listing Knox as "the first street west of Lark". Two decades later, in 1850, it was included on the city's official map although it still remained a paper street although more homes were shown in the area. Buildings are also shown at the northwest corner of Knox and Morris as well as at 139 Knox; it is unlikely that the latter is the extant structure.

Wilson died in 1855; his son and widow continued to operate the nursery. After the Civil War, they sold it. In the 1870s development of the area picked up as Washington Park began construction on the former parade ground. Thomas Davidson, who bought the Wilson nursery in 1871, subdivided the lots on Knox Street into their current size. The city's horsecar line was extended west to what is now New Scotland Road to serve the park; other infrastructure, such as water and sewer lines, soon followed.

=== 1875–present: Development and restoration ===
The lots in the vicinity of the park had been sold to many local speculators and developers. One of the latter, John and Edmund Walsh, builders whose father may have worked in the nursery, grew up in the neighborhood. After developing several rows along Madison, they turned their attention south. In 1875 they built 131–35 Knox, the first houses in the district besides Wilson's. It is believed that they built other houses along that section of the street; however, except for the freestanding gabled house at 137 Knox, none remain.

In 1880 the block of Knox between Morris and what was then known as Yates Avenue, where the majority of the district is located, was finally opened. The lots were sold to individual buyers, but remained undeveloped. The following year, 13 of those owners, representing most of the frontage along the block, sued the city over the paving of the street, complaining that the work was consistently below the standards called for.

John Walsh left his brother's construction business that same year. By 1882 tax records show that at least 140 Knox had been built and was owned by Ann Martin, the wife of a local builder. In the next few years the row from 146 through 158 was built, and shortly afterwards 142 and 144. The earlier houses had been strictly Italianate in design, but the later ones began showing the influence of the emerging Queen Anne Style.

By 1886 the last houses to be built, the 143–153 row, were complete. Their forms show the influence of another contemporary style, the Romanesque Revival. The brownstone trim suggests specifically the work of Henry Hobson Richardson. While it is highly likely because of their similarity that they are the work of the same builder, it is not known if that builder was John Walsh.

To the south, Davidson, now joined by his brother, continued to operate the nursery. Records from the time show another house attached to 74 Morris as well as greenhouses along Morris and Knox near the intersection. The Davidsons owned the southern half of the block west to what is now New Scotland Road. It stayed that way even after a building boom in the neighborhood in 1892, following the completion of Washington Park.

By 1908, the year of the next great surge in building what is now Park South, the east–west cross streets had houses on both sides. The nursery was listed in city atlases as a flower shop, under different ownership. Yates Street had been renamed Dana Avenue.

The next detailed map of the area, a 1934 insurance map, shows little sign of the nursery save Wilson's original house. By then the neighborhood was essentially built out. The map shows a rowhouse next to Wilson's similar to the others on the block; it has since been demolished.

Over the course of the rest of the 20th century, the neighborhood suffered from urban decay, like many of Albany's other older enclaves. Residents and new buyers moved out to newer, more suburban regions of the city or its suburbs. The houses suffered from neglect, and were sometimes abandoned. In the first decade of the 21st century, a Boston-based developer won a contract to redevelop 18 of the houses on Knox between Dana and Morris. It spent $12.5 million, with the help of grants from the city and state tax credits, to accomplish the project. In 2009 it received an award from the state's Office of Parks, Recreation and Historic Preservation for its restoration efforts.

== See also ==
- National Register of Historic Places listings in Albany, New York
