= Rapp Road Community Historic District =

Historic district in New York, United States

- U.S. National Register of Historic Places
- U.S. Historic district
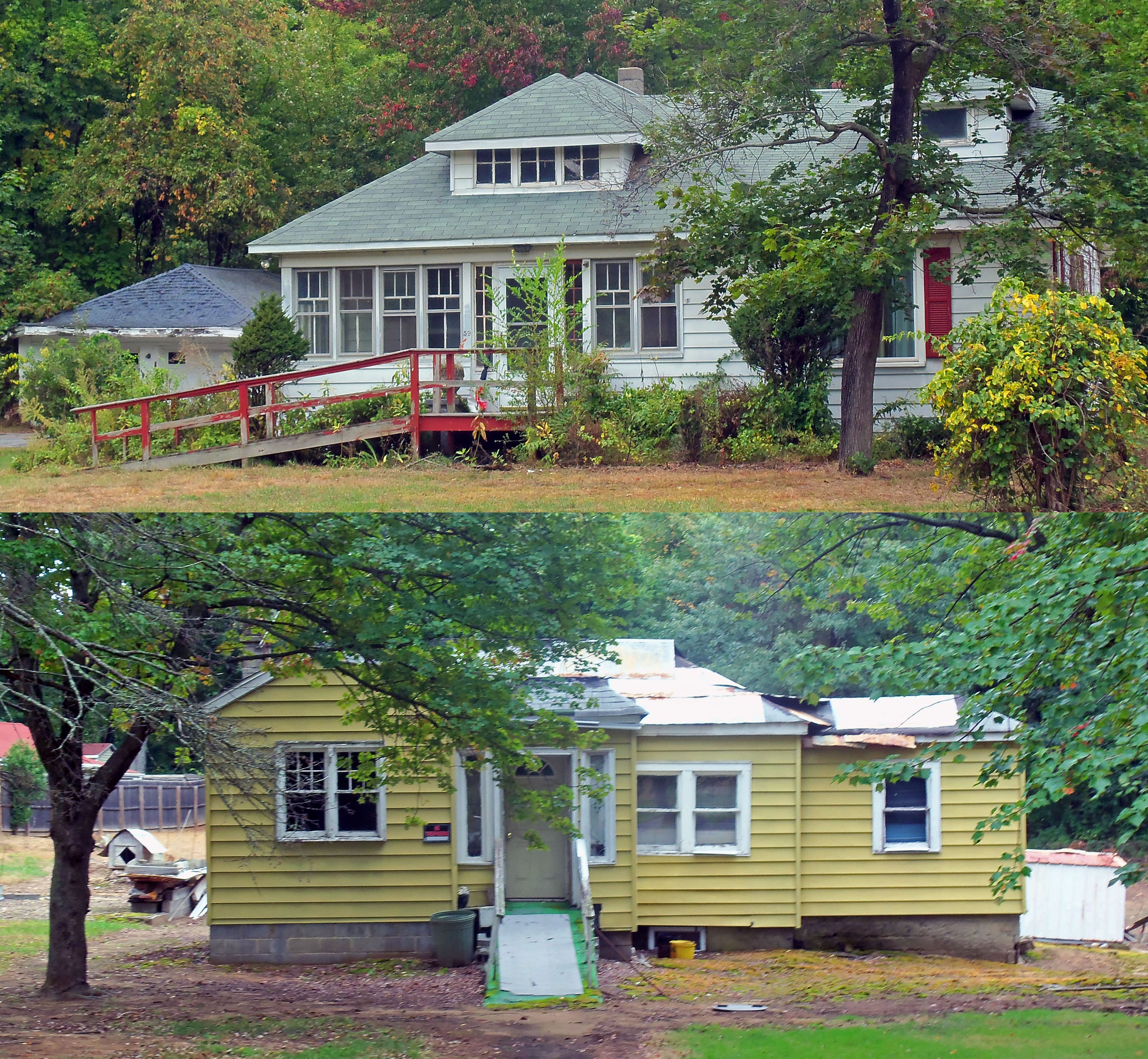
- Front elevations, 67 and 68 Rapp Road, 2012

- Location within New York Location within the United States
- Location: Albany, NY
- Coordinates: 42°41′46″N 73°51′12″W
- Area: 14 acres (5.7 ha)
- Built: 1930
- Architectural style: Bungalow/Craftsman
- NRHP reference No.: 02001620
- Added to NRHP: December 27, 2002

The Rapp Road Community Historic District is located in the Pine Bush area of Albany, New York. It is a 14-acre (5.7 ha) residential neighborhood. In 2002 it was listed on the National Register of Historic Places.

It was established in the 1920s by Rev. Louis W. Parson, an African American minister, and his wife, who had moved north from Mississippi in the Great Migration out of the rural South to industrial cities, originally settling in Albany's South End. He was followed by other members of his congregation. Neither he nor they liked urban life much, and eventually he bought the land along Rapp Road where they all moved.

Half of the original purchase was taken by the state for road projects in the 1970s. The remaining half, today's historic district, has many of the original buildings. Most of the original families' descendants still live there. It is a rare intact example of a chain migration community from the Great Migration, although many such communities formed in northern cities.

== Geography ==
Rapp Road is located in the long, narrow western protrusion of Albany known as the Pine Bush. The portion of the street on which the district is located lies between Pine Lane and the South Frontage Road of Washington Avenue Extension. It is just north of the boundary between the city and the Town of Guilderland.

To the southeast is Crossgates Mall. Wooded lands on the east and west serve as a buffer between the historic district and the mall and various other commercial and office developments in those directions. It is isolated from any other residential neighborhoods by Interstates 87 and 90, both part of the New York State Thruway, to the north and east. The land is generally level.

The district is formed by the 27 lots that remain of the two original purchases that created the neighborhood, on both sides of the road. There are 21 buildings on those lots, all but two of which are contributing properties. One property has two stone piers marking its driveway, both of which are considered contributing objects. The buildings are all wood frame residences, a mix of cottages and traditional shotgun houses.

== History ==
=== Pre-1920s ===
The land upon which the Rapp Road Community eventually formed is within the Albany Pine Bush, one of the largest of the world's 20 inland pine barrens. When Europeans arrived in the early 17th century, the Pine Bush was in use as hunting grounds and woodlots of the Mohawk nation of the Haudenosaunee to the west along the Mohawk River, and the Mahican to the east, along the Hudson River.

=== Great Migration ===
The Reverend Louis W. Parson and his wife migrated to Albany from Shubuta, Mississippi in 1927. He founded the First Church of God in Christ in Albany. In four trips to Mississippi, Parson encouraged friends and family to move to Albany and join his church. Many friends and family did during the 1930s and 1940s. Some were sharecroppers who owed money to their landlords. Eventually the majority of African Americans from Shubuta moved to Albany. They were among the nearly 1.5 million African Americans who left the South during what has been called the first wave of the Great Migration, going to northern and midwestern industrial cities for more opportunities and to escape violence against them. From 1940 to 1970, another 5 million African Americans migrated from the South, many to the West Coast, where the defense industry had many jobs.

Despite pressure from the city government against recruiting unemployed people due to the Depression, Parson continued to encourage people from Shubuta to come to Albany throughout the 1930s. But many of the migrants did not like life in the South End. Their religious values were affronted by the bars, brothels and gambling houses in the neighborhood. Having come from rural areas, they found northern city life hard to adjust to. Some returned to Mississippi.

Between 1930 and 1933, Parson found two 14-acre (5.7 ha) parcels of undeveloped land west of Albany in the Pine Bush as a site for his community. Others from Shubuta moved to this location. They saved money and built, by themselves, houses similar to what they had known in Mississippi. After the purchases were fully closed in 1942, two years after Parson's death, families began building their own houses with help from friends and family over the next decades. Many began growing crops and raising animals on the land, becoming self-sufficient. During the World War II years, especially, building materials were hard to obtain because they were diverted to the war effort. One family found they could complete a small shotgun house but not the larger house that they had started.

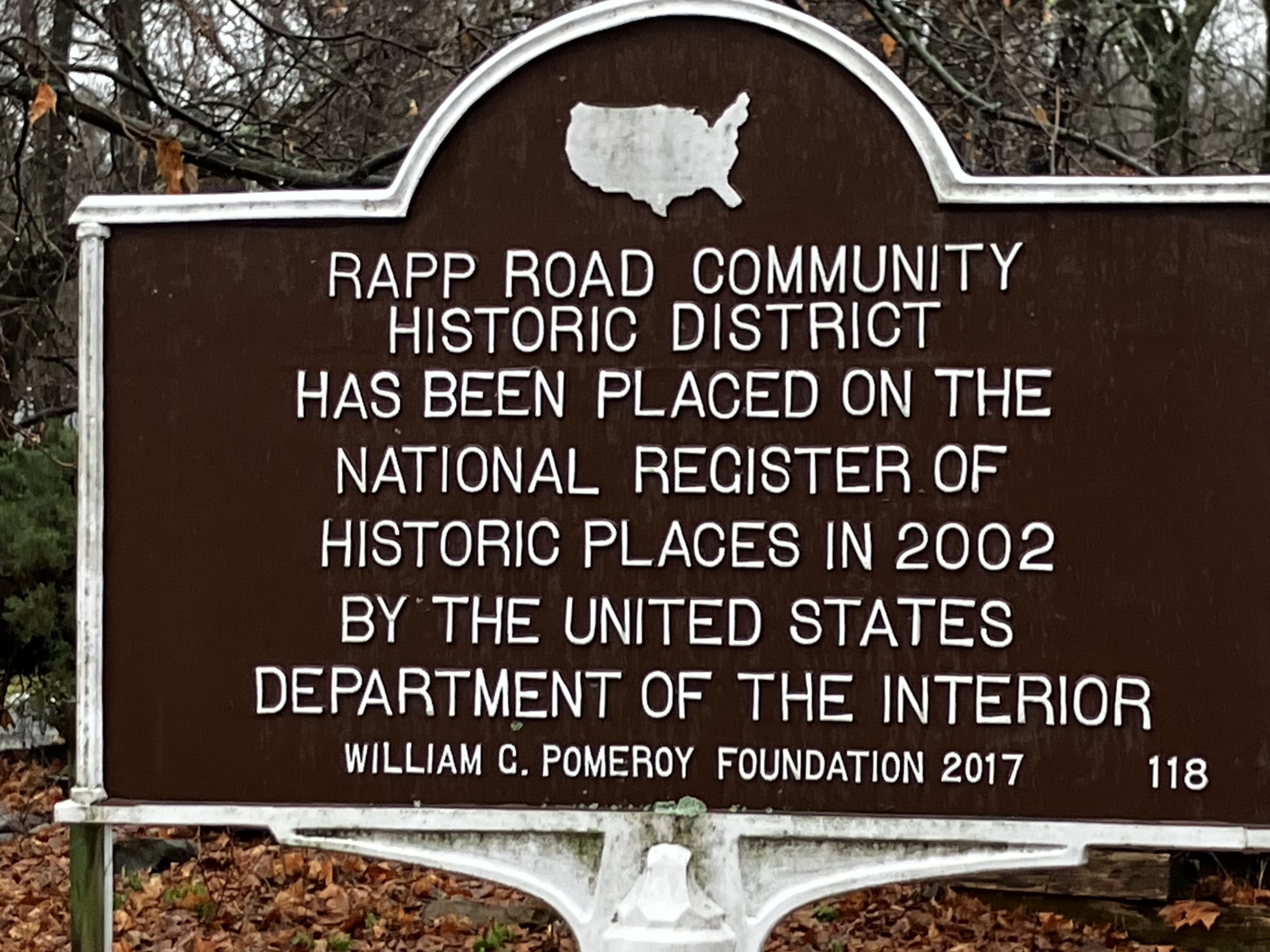
Rapp Road Community Historic District Marker

At the neighborhood's peak, 23 families lived on Rapp Road. The community remained intact until 1971, when the state planned the Washington Avenue Extension to improve connections between Albany and its growing western suburbs. It conducted eminent domain proceedings to acquire the northern parcel. Most of the homeowners moved away. One who lived at what is today the middle of the extension, chose instead to have her house moved. Today it is located at the north end of the street, 8 Rapp Road, 300 feet (90 m) south of its original location.

The community has survived despite the disruption and the large-scale development of the surrounding area. Many descendants of the original homeowners have returned to raise their families here. Every year the community holds a "family reunion", and every other year holds an additional celebration in Shubuta for those relatives who still live there. As of 2008, 15 of the original 23 families remain.

In 2002 the community was designated by the state of New York as a "New York State Historic District" and in 2003 as a National Historic District. In 2006 the state Department of Education chartered the Rapp Road Historical Association, which has formed to preserve and interpret the history of the area.

== See also ==
- National Register of Historic Places listings in Albany, New York
