= Nut Grove =

Historic house in New York, United States

- U.S. National Register of Historic Places
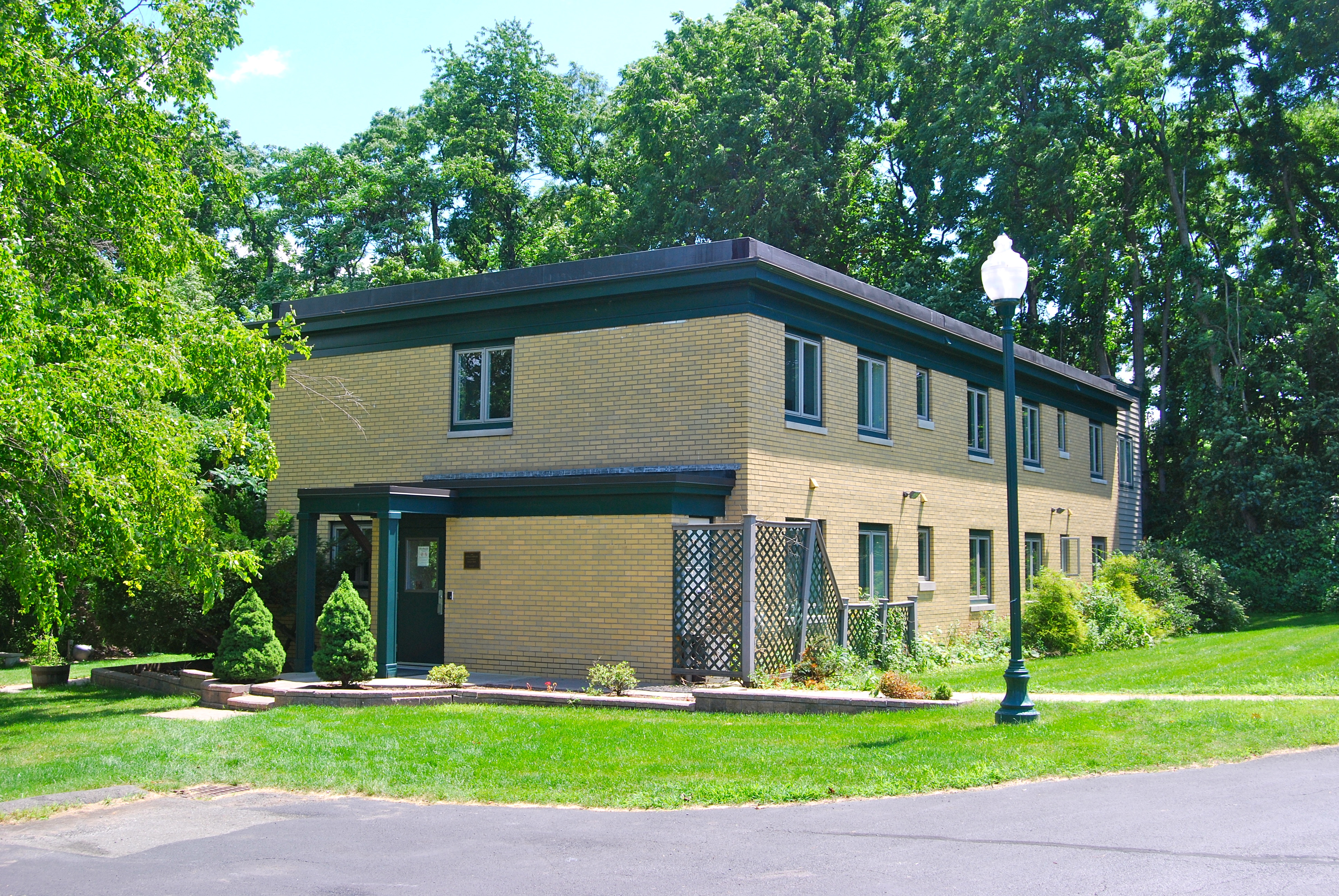
- North elevation and east profile, 2011

- Location within New York Location within the United States
- Location: Albany, NY
- Coordinates: 42°38′0″N 73°46′6″W
- Area: 8 acres (3.2 ha)
- Built: 1845
- Architect: Alexander Jackson Davis
- Architectural style: Greek Revival
- NRHP reference No.: 74001215
- Added to NRHP: July 30, 1974

Nut Grove, also known as the William Walsh House, is a historic house located on McCarty Avenue in Albany, New York, United States. It is a brick building originally designed in the Greek Revival architectural style by architect Alexander Jackson Davis in the mid-19th century. In 1974 it was listed on the National Register of Historic Places.

It is Davis's only house in that style in the Hudson Valley, and one of the rare Greek Revival houses to use the "Grecian country house" variant of the style. In the early 20th century it was modified for use as a hospital. Today it is part of a drug treatment clinic, known as the Reilly House and used for sober living. Much of its original ornamentation is gone, but it retains the basic form and some of the interior decoration.

== Building ==
The building as it is today stands at the rear of the Addictions Care Center of Albany's (ACCA) 8-acre (3.2 ha) property on the south side of McCarty just east of Bowne Street, near the southern boundary of the city. To its west and northwest are ACCA's other two, more modern buildings, and a parking lot. A meditation garden and gazebo are located to the north, part of a grassy area with some mature trees separating ACCA from the Nutgrove Garden public housing complex on Nutgrove Lane to the east. Cherry Hill, another old estate listed on the Register, is a quarter-mile (500 m) to the east on South Pearl Street (New York State Route 32) just north of McCarty. Across McCarty are modern single-family homes. To the south is a wooded slope leading down to Interstate 787.

The building itself is a two-story structure of yellow brick, five bays wide along its long side. It is topped by a flat roof. A small shed-roofed one story addition is on the west side of the facade, housing what is now the main entrance at its east end. A wood frame addition with clapboard extends one bay from the south, complemented by one extending from the east just above the southeast corner.

Along the east facade, originally the front, is a full-length verandah supported by columns. The window lintels have shell or rosette designs, and the original main entrance has Greek Revival detailing. On the north side, the current main entrance has a small porch with a flat roof supported by square columns. Both the shed-roofed addition and the main block's roof are topped with a plain wide frieze and box cornice. A modern roof with larger box cornice, pierced by a chimney at the south end, forms the uppermost layer.

== History ==
When the house was built, in 1845, it was south of Albany's city limits, in the Town of Bethlehem. William Walsh and his wife were part of the city's wealthy aristocracy. They were related by marriage to Henry James.

Those connections led them to friends of Davis, who had built many structures in the Hudson Valley, notably the 1839 Oliver Bronson House in Hudson, today recognized as a National Historic Landmark (NHL). Most of his houses were in either the various Gothic Revival styles becoming popular at the time or the new Hudson River Bracketed mode considered to have been developed by the Bronson house. Both styles were seen as gentler and more harmonious with the surrounding countryside in comparison with the Greek Revival style, whose monumentality, especially in its temple variant, was more suited to public buildings and churches, such as Davis's 1835 Dutch Reformed Church at Newburgh, also an NHL.

For the Walshes, Davis built a Grecian country house overlooking the Hudson River. That variant retains the basic form and symmetry of the standard Greek Revival house, but with some slight deviations and extra decoration to create interest and distinguish it from more standard country houses. Nut Grove was originally topped with a hipped roof, had two rear wings and featured diamond-paned glass windows. A garage and cottage were also located to the southwest.

Davis designed several similar Grecian country houses after 1835. A simplified version, with some Italianate features, appears in The Architecture of Country Houses, Andrew Jackson Downing's influential 1850 pattern book. Nut Grove is the only one known to survive.

The Walshes lived at Nut Grove until William died in 1863. His wife soon remarried to Robert Donaldson, who owned two other Davis houses downriver in Barrytown, one of which she moved into with him. Her nephew, Dudley Walsh, took over Nut Grove.

In the 1870s, Walsh sold it to Thomas McCarty, an Irish immigrant who had become a wealthy brickmaker. McCarty had served two terms on Albany's City Council before becoming a state assemblyman. The city eventually annexed the area around Nut Grove, and McCarty made two unsuccessful bids for mayor. He built a driveway connecting the property to South Pearl Street, the beginning of today's McCarty Avenue, and began to subdivide the property.

The house was purchased in 1902 by Eleanor Spensley, who had founded the Hospital for Incurables in downtown Albany 20 years earlier. She died two months later. For hospital purposes the roof was raised and dormer windows added.

In that form, the Hospital for Incurables continued operating in the house until 1973. After it was closed the two rear wings were demolished. It remained vacant, owned by the hospital, until sometime after it was listed on the Register in 1974 when the Addictions Care Center of Albany acquired the property. The roof was completely replaced with a flat roof and modern sliding windows were installed. It is now the Reilly House, a sober living environment that can hold up to 12 men at a time.

== See also ==
- National Register of Historic Places listings in Albany, New York
