= 48 Hudson Avenue =

Historic house in New York, United States

- Van Ostrande–Radliff House
- U.S. National Register of Historic Places
- U.S. Historic district – Contributing property
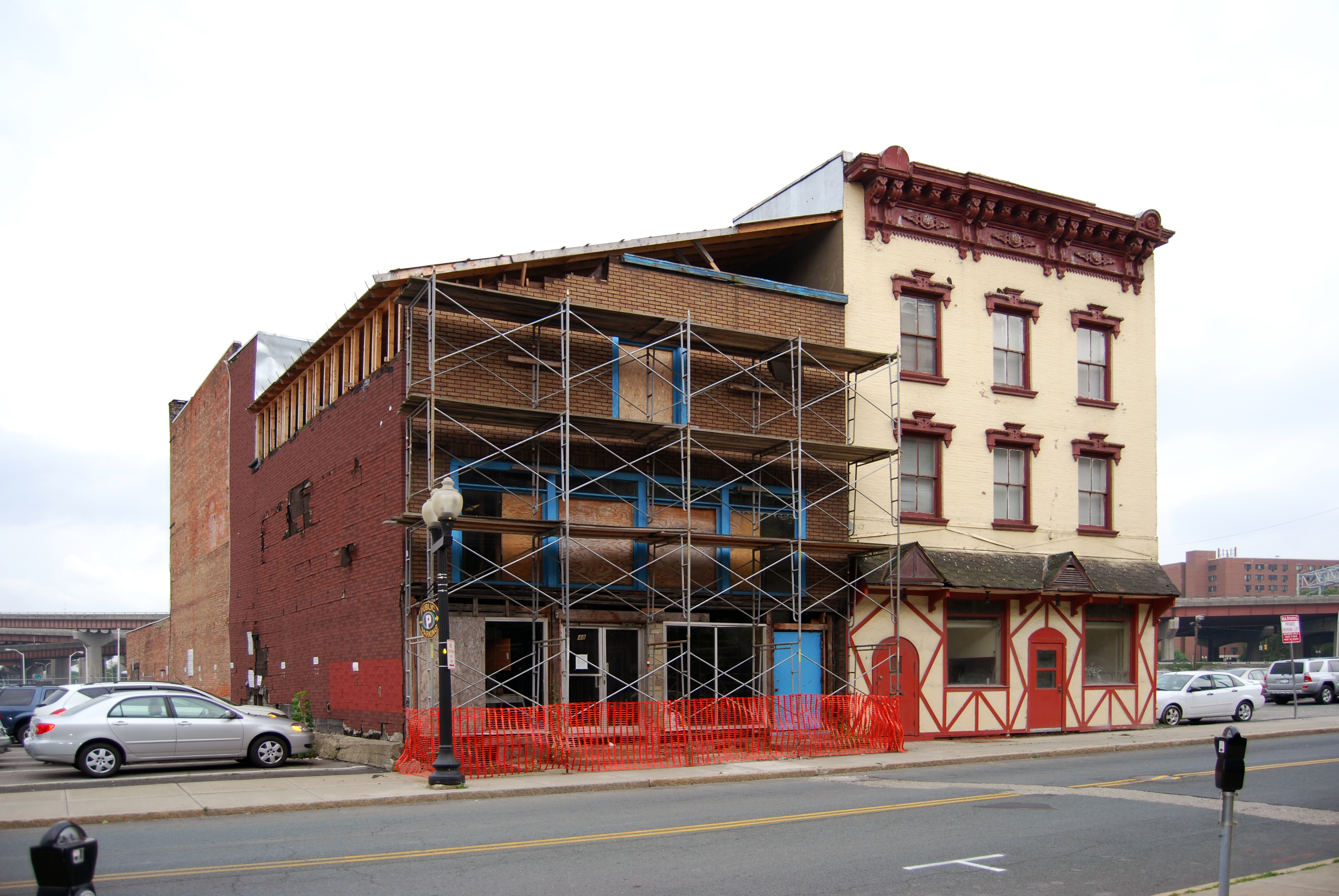
- 48 Hudson Avenue undergoing preservation and restoration in 2009

- Location within New York Location within the United States
- Location: 48 Hudson Avenue, Albany, New York
- Coordinates: 42°38′51.1″N 73°45′6.76″W
- Built: 1728
- Architectural style: Dutch Colonial
- Part of: Downtown Albany Historic District
- NRHP reference No.: 07000291
- Added to NRHP: January 10, 2008

48 Hudson Avenue (also known as the Van Ostrande–Radliff House) is the oldest building in the city of Albany, New York. It was believed by Paul Huey, in the Albany architectural guide of 1993, to have been built in 1759 by Johannes Radliff when he married Elizabeth Singleton because he believed it was built after the stockade was moved south by one block. Research done by Albany historian John Wolcott proved that it had been occupied by Johannes van Ostrande between 1728 and 1734 and that a mortgage Radliff had on the house referred to it as "formerly van Ostrande." The Lamont–Doherty Earth Sciences laboratory of Columbia University performed dendrochronology on a wood core sample from the building to confirm that the building dated from 1728. It has been listed on the National Register of Historic Places since January 10, 2008; prior to that, it had been a contributing property to the Downtown Albany Historic District.

== History ==
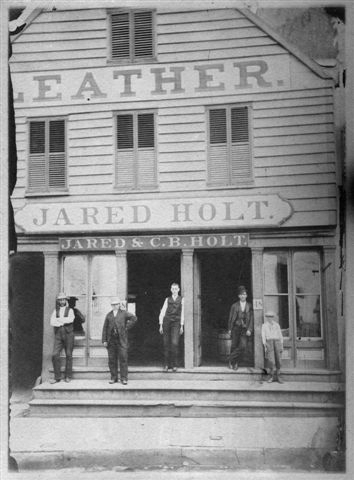
48 Hudson Avenue pictured when it was the Jared & C.B. Holt leather store.

48 Hudson Avenue was built by Johannes van Ostrande in 1728 just outside the stockade walls and a few hundred yards from the old Fort Orange. Johannes Van Ostrande (or Ostrander) was the son of the immigrant Pieter Ostrander, baptized in Kingston, New York in 1688, married there, and moved to Albany by 1715. In 1722, Van Ostrande was elected a member of the Albany Common Council representing the First Ward,. In the 1750s, he sold the building to Johannes Radliff, a shoe-maker. During the 19th century the building was the home, and later factory, of Jared Holt. Holt made waxed thread used for sewing leather goods.

== Future ==
48 Hudson Avenue sits within what was once the core area of the proposed Albany Convention Center. The Albany Convention Center Authority has worked with the New York State Office of Parks, Recreation and Historic Preservation to preserve the structure, mitigate adverse impacts, and recover archaeological resources. The Authority has also spoken with the owner of 48 Hudson Avenue regarding efforts to preserve the building.

== Structure ==
As originally built it was a 1 1/2-story building, with a steep gable roof of fifty-four degrees. The house measured 23 by 33 feet with one large first-floor room and two lofts. The first floor was brick, while the top portion was pine shakes. The building has many rare features not often preserved in other buildings from its time, including a molded anchor beam, the outline of a jambless fireplace, wide pine exterior siding, wide floorboards, steeply pitched roof beams, and original brick walls.

== See also ==
- History of Albany, New York
- National Register of Historic Places listings in Albany, New York
- Quackenbush House
