= Buildings at 744–750 Broadway =

- Buildings at 744, 746, 748, 750 Broadway
- U.S. National Register of Historic Places
- U.S. Historic district
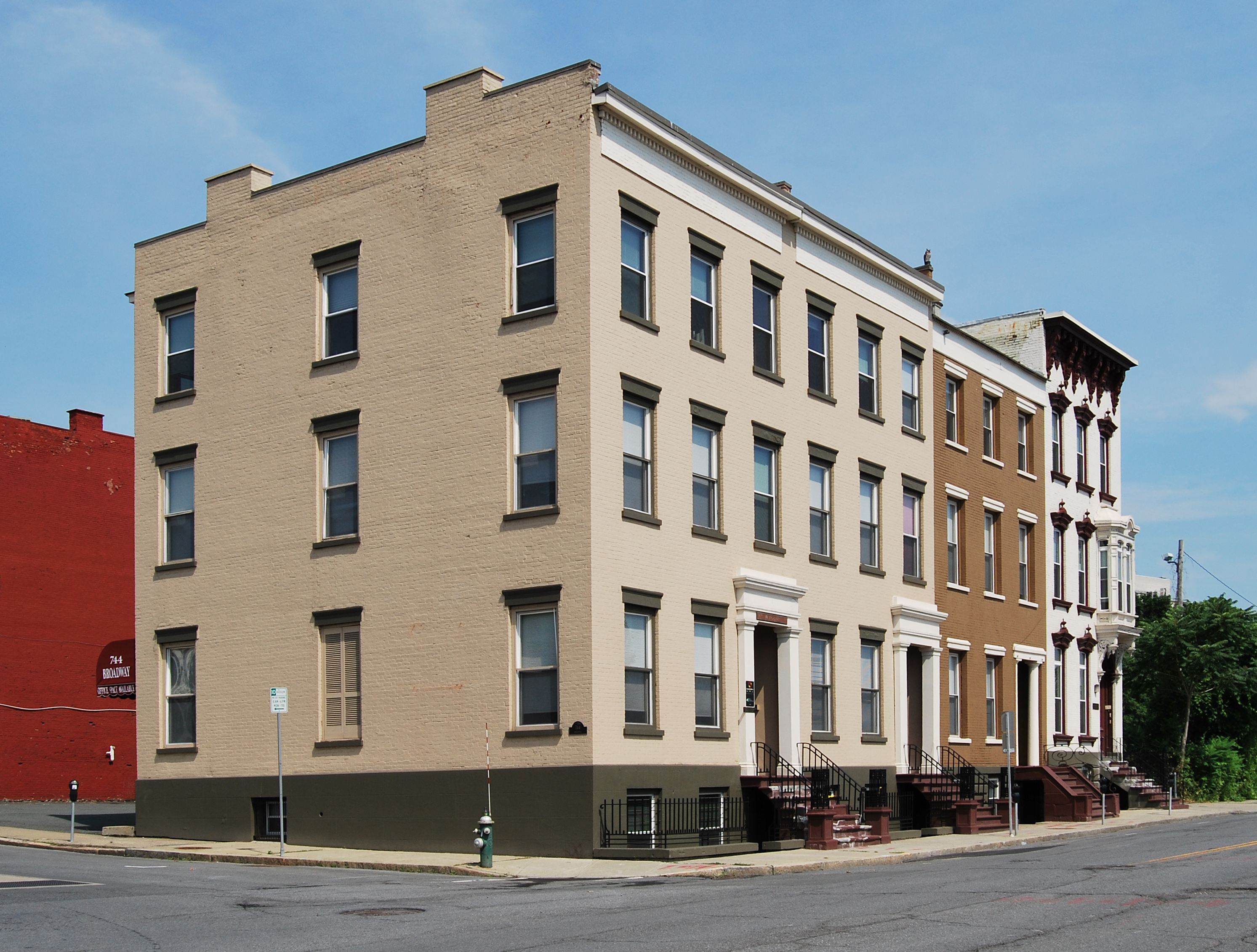
- South profile and east elevation, 2011

- Location within New York Location within the United States
- Location: 744–750 Broadway, Albany, NY
- Coordinates: 42°39′22″N 73°44′55″W
- Built: 1833–1875
- Architectural style: Federal, Greek Revival, Italianate
- NRHP reference No.: 87002180
- Added to NRHP: December 17, 1987

The buildings at 744–750 Broadway in Albany, New York, United States, sometimes known as Broadway Row, are four brick row houses on the northwest corner of the intersection with Wilson Street. They were built over a period of 40 years in the 19th century, using a variety of architectural styles reflecting the times they were built in. At that time the neighborhood, known as the Fifth Ward, was undergoing rapid expansion due to the Erie Canal and the city's subsequent industrialization.

Many rowhouses lined that section of Broadway during that time. Today only these four remain, following years of demolition and urban renewal. In 1987 they were listed on the National Register of Historic Places.

== Property ==
The Broadway-Wilson intersection is just north of downtown Albany. The four houses are opposite the Edward O'Neill Federal Building to the south. The Broadway-Livingston Avenue Historic District is one block to the north. The lots along Broadway north of this row are vacant.

All four buildings share the same basic form. They are three stories tall, three bays wide with a raised basement. Their main entrances open to main hallways on the side.

The buildings differ in their ornamentation. The two southern rowhouses, 744 and 746, are an identical pair with sandstone facing on their foundations. Stone stoops with wrought iron railings lead to entrances framed by sandstone architraves and molded pilasters topped by a molded entablature. Sandstone is also used for the window trim. Along the roofline they have denticulated cornices and a plain frieze. Both are topped by paired chimneys on the southern side.

The house at 748 Broadway has rusticated sandstone on its basement. Doric columns frame its entrance, and there is much marble molding. Its windows are done in flat molded wood. It is the only one of the four to not have a flat roof, instead rising to a shallow-pitched gable.

Rusticated sandstone also finishes the basement of 750 Broadway, which has the most elaborate decoration of the four. Sandstone is also used for its balustraded steps, leading to a double-doored paneled entrance topped by a transom. Its windowsills are bracketed, with finials on the lintels. An oriel above the entrance is heavily decorated, and its roof comes to a bracketed cornice with an ornate frieze.

== History ==
At the time of Albany's incorporation in 1686, Clinton Avenue was the city's northern boundary. Eighty years later, Stephen Van Rensselaer II, patroon of the surrounding lands, had the area just north of the city surveyed and laid out a grid plan covering the area from Clinton to North Ferry and west from the Hudson River to Northern Boulevard. This became, in 1795, the Town of Colonie.

The area grew, and by 1815 had a thousand residents. They petitioned to be annexed to Albany that year, and became the city's Fifth Ward. Ten years later, the completion of the Erie Canal, which reached the Hudson a few blocks north of Broadway and Wilson, spurred the city's economy, and development of the Fifth Ward increased as nearby harbor and rail facilities were expanded and built over time, along with the industries that took advantage of the canal's presence. The city's population nearly doubled in a decade.

Broadway north of Clinton became a residential area for the city's affluent families, and George Talcott, a retired Army colonel, built 748 Broadway in 1833 in a late vernacular application of the Federal style with some more current Greek Revival decorative touches. His family lived there for many years. It remains one of the city's most sophisticated examples of the combination of those two styles.

Eight years later, in 1841, Sanford Cobb, the city chamberlain, built the two houses at 744 and 746 Broadway. Their Greek Revival touches went beyond the doorway to the building's cornice as well. Members of the Van Schaick family, one of Albany's oldest, later lived in 744.

The lot at 750 remained undeveloped until 1875, when Jacob Sager, a manufacturer of window trim, built his house there. Its decoration reflects the Italianate style common for late 19th-century urban American townhouses, with a sweeping balustrade and bracketed cornice. His family lived there for the rest of the century.

Most of Broadway's rowhouses were demolished over the course of the mid- and late 20th century, many for urban renewal. The construction of the federal office building to the south in 1969 eliminated the only other large section. These four long remained intact private residences. Recently, a local developer has renovated them with the intent of leasing 14,000 square feet (1,300 m^{2}) as office space.

== See also ==
- National Register of Historic Places listings in Albany, New York
