= Quackenbush House =

Historic house in New York, United States

- U.S. National Register of Historic Places
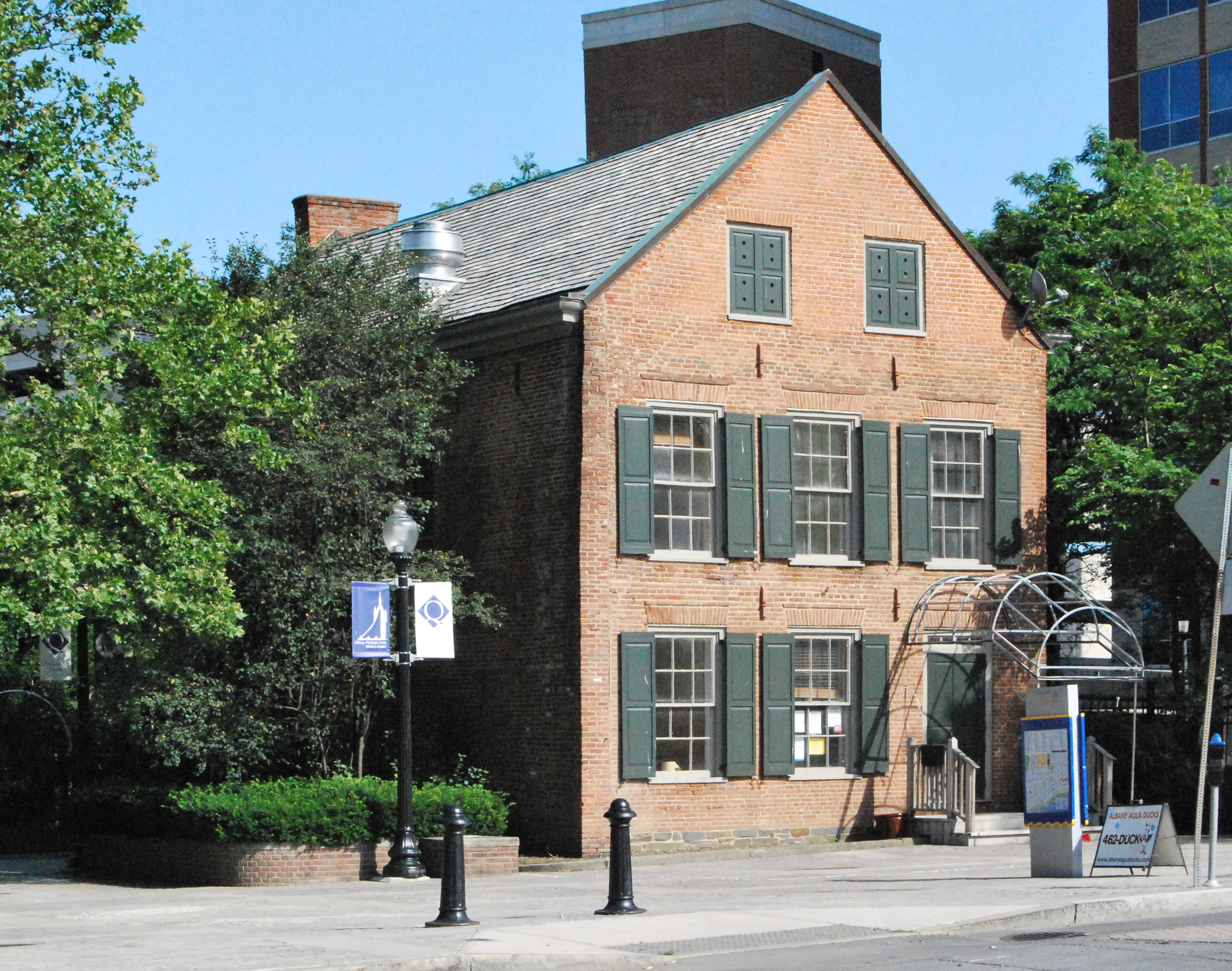
- South elevation, 2011

- Location within New York Location within the United States
- Interactive map showing the location of Quackenbush House
- Location: 683 Broadway, Albany, New York
- Coordinates: 42°39′14.47″N 73°44′54.45″W
- Architectural style: Colonial, Dutch Colonial
- NRHP reference No.: 72000816
- Added to NRHP: June 19, 1972

Quackenbush House is a historic building in Albany, New York. It is a house with a double-pitched gable roof that was built in about 1736. It was listed on the National Register of Historic Places in 1972.

== History ==
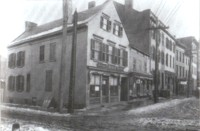
Quackenbush House as seen in 1890, the buildings to the right have since been replaced by an exit ramp of I-787.

The Quackenbush House, built in the 1730s, was until recently considered the oldest house and structure in the city of Albany. However, it has recently been discovered that 48 Hudson Avenue may have been built as early as 1728. The Quackenbush House was originally beyond the city limit of the city of Albany as established by the Dongan Charter at Clinton Avenue, which was Patroon Street at the time. In 1812 the city would annex land to the north including the Quackenbush House. The building has been home to two French restaurants, Nicole's Bistro (1995–2008) and Le Canard Enchaine (2008–2009). Today the building is home to an English-style pub, The Olde English Pub and Pantry. The current mailing address for the restaurant is 25 Quackenbush Square. Also at Quackenbush Square is the Albany Heritage Area Visitors Center with a gift shop, the Henry Hudson Planetarium, and the Albany County Convention and Visitors Bureau.

== See also ==
- History of Albany, New York
- Albany Pump Station
