= Albany Pump Station =

- Quackenbush Pumping Station, Albany Water Works
- U.S. National Register of Historic Places
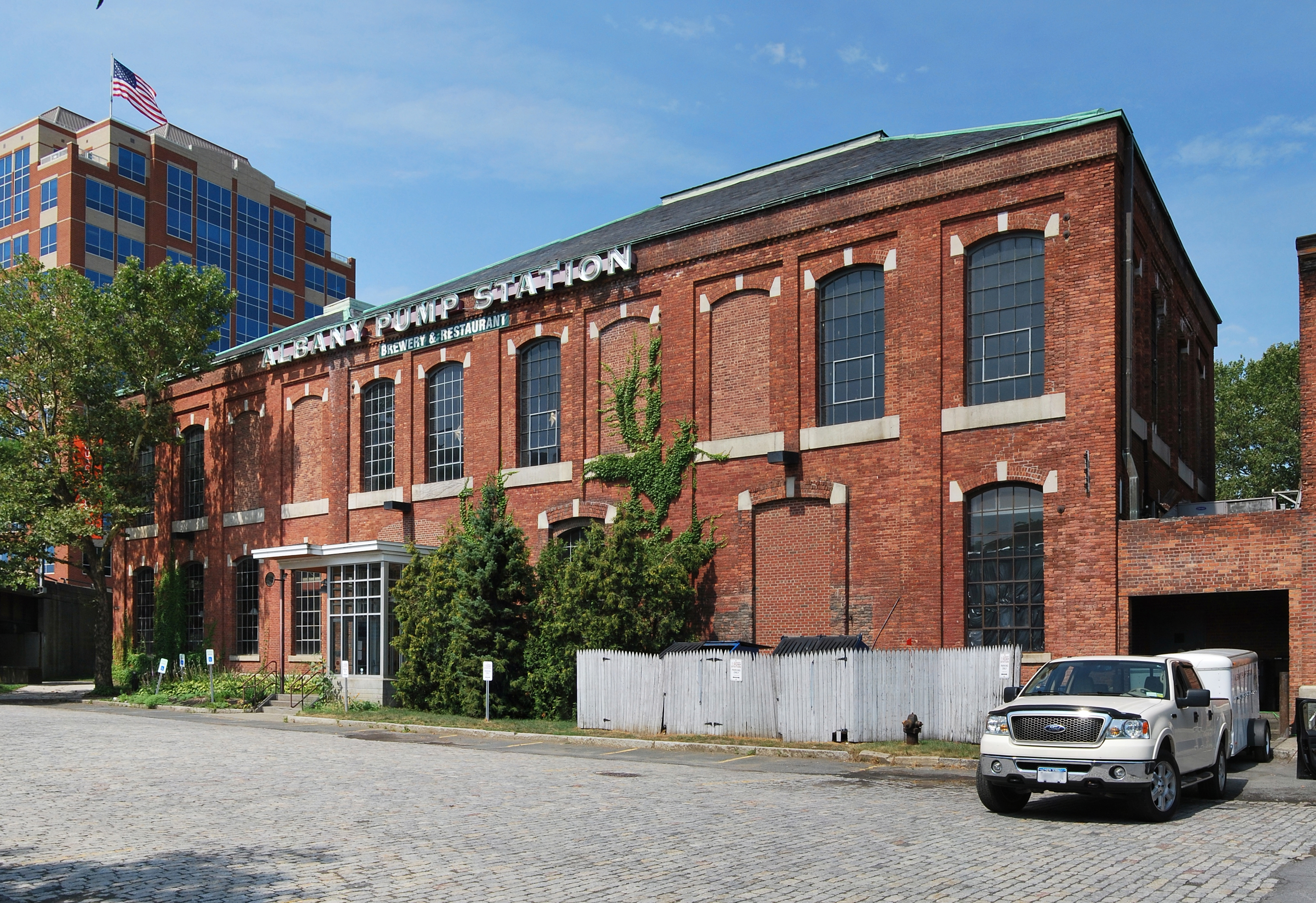
- East (front) elevation, 2011
- Location: Albany, NY
- Coordinates: 42°39′15″N 73°44′53″W
- Built: 1873
- Architect: Edward Ogden
- NRHP reference No.: 83001634
- Added to NRHP: June 30, 1983

The Albany Pump Station, originally the Quackenbush Pumping Station of the Albany Water Works, is located in Quackenbush Square on Broadway in the city of Albany, New York, United States. It is a large brick building constructed in the 1870s and expanded later in the century.

The station was built to pump municipal water from the nearby Hudson River, and it continued to be used for that purpose for 60 years. In 1983, the station was listed on the National Register of Historic Places. The station has been partly converted into a popular local restaurant and brewpub, a reuse that drew an award from the Preservation League of New York State. Another area of the building serves as the city of Albany's visitor center.

== Building ==
The pumphouse building complex is part of Quackenbush Square. Quackenbush Square is a small pedestrian mall area named for the nearby Quackenbush House, one of the oldest buildings in Albany. It is located just off Broadway.

Its main block is a two-story four-by-four-bay brick building with a hipped roof shingled in slate. Large elliptically arched windows, doubled on the second story, fill the west (front) facade. They are trimmed with brick lintels, keystones and stone sills, separated by broad pilasters.

A later northern extension is similar. To the south is a two-story brick building with rounded windows; this building was originally used as a stable. A narrow extension protrudes from the north.

Inside, little remains of the original use or equipment. Renovations to create a restaurant on the east side of the building retained its industrial character but opened the interior space to create 40-foot (12 m) ceilings. Two 20-ton (18-tonne) cranes were retained and used to hoist the brewery's serving tanks. The Albany Heritage Area Visitors Center, a gift shop and the Henry Hudson Planetarium are located along the south facade on Quackenbush Square.

== History ==
=== Pumping station ===
In 1670, Albany's water supply system consisted of wells located at the future site of the New York State Capitol. By the mid-19th century, the system had grown to include several small reservoirs created by damming local creeks. The city's explosive growth around the time of the Civil War began to test and strain that system. Eventually, the city's water commission decided it could meet present and future demand only by tapping the Hudson River directly instead of relying on distant tributaries.

In 1873, the City bought land at the corner of Montgomery and Quackenbush streets. Local architect Edward Ogden designed the main block of the station, and it was built later in the year. It had room for two steam-driven pumps that could move river water to Bleecker Reservoir (the site of the future Bleecker Stadium) west of the city. A neighboring house was demolished and a boiler house built on its site.

Five years later, in 1878, the station was supplemented by Prospect Hill Reservoir and another pumping station in the west of the city to serve new neighborhoods growing there. The pump station was expanded in 1895, and again two years later, with a nearby house taken over for office use. Three more pumps were put in service.

The station continued to draw river water for the city for the next three decades. In 1935, Alcove Reservoir was built in the countryside south of the city, and Albany's water needs were finally satisfied for the long term. The station pumped its last water in 1937.

=== Brewpub and restaurant ===
The station remained in city hands and was used by the city's water department. The department primarily used the station as a storage facility after it was taken offline. Four decades later, in 1977, the station was extensively renovated. It continued to be used for storage and suffered structural neglect and decline.

In 1999, a local man named Neil Evans decided to resurrect the brewery his family had run downriver in Hudson from 1786 to Prohibition. He started the C.H. Evans Brewing Company and bought the station. When Evans renovated the station, he insisted on retaining its industrial ambiance. Evans opened a brewpub and restaurant at the station in 1999, naming it the Albany Pump Station. The establishment became a popular spot due to its location just northeast of downtown. The following year, the Preservation League of New York recognized the building with an award for Project Excellence. Beer writer Lew Bryson praised not only the brews on tap but the building, calling it "a great setting for a brewpub". C.H. Evans Brewing Company at the Albany Pump Station's original brewmaster, George de Piro, twice won awards at the World Beer Cup:Munich Dunkel took a silver in 2008 in the European-Style Dark category, and Kick-Ass Brown received a 2004 bronze in the American-Style Brown Ale category. His Kick-Ass Brown also won the gold medal in the American-style Brown Ale category at the 2000, 2002 and 2008 Great American Beer Festival.

Evans died in June 2023, and the Albany Pump Station brewpub and restaurant closed on October 29, 2023. Common Roots Brewing of South Glens Falls, New York opened its Albany outpost at the station on February 29, 2024.

== See also ==
- Albany Steam Station
