= Old Post Office (Albany, New York) =

- U.S. National Register of Historic Places
- U.S. Historic district – Contributing property
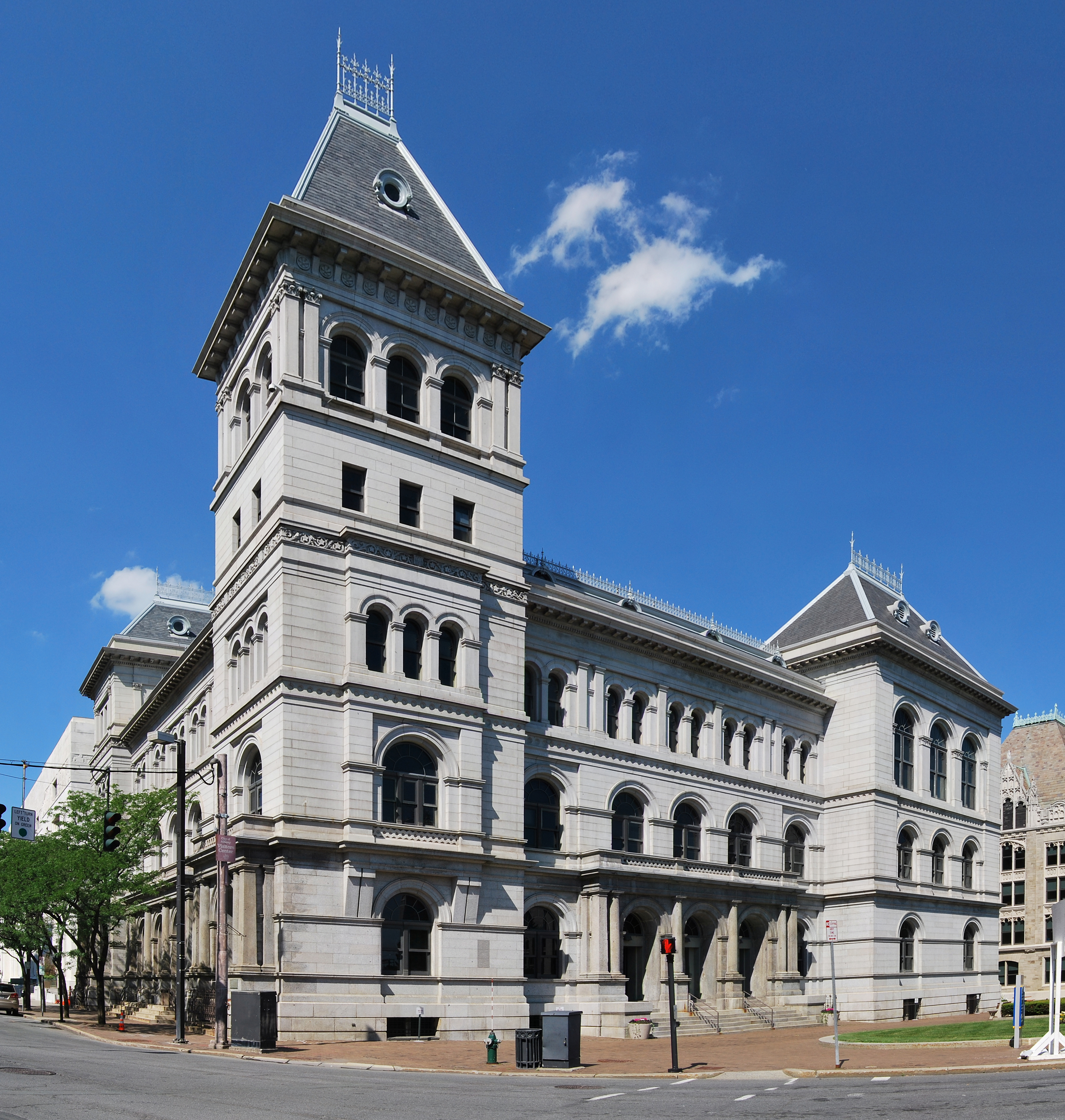
- West profile and south elevation, 2011
- Interactive map showing the Old Post Office in Albany’s location
- Location: Northeast corner of State Street and Broadway, Albany, NY
- Coordinates: 42°38′56″N 73°45′1″W
- Built: 1879
- Architect: Edward Ogden; James G. Hill
- Architectural style: Renaissance Revival
- Part of: Downtown Albany Historic District
- NRHP reference No.: 72000814
- Added to NRHP: January 20, 1972

The Old Post Office, also known as the United States Government Building, is located at the intersection of State Street and Broadway in Albany, New York, United States. It was built from 1879 to 1883 at a cost of $627,148.

Plans for the building had been made two decades prior to its construction. Originally it was to be a larger Gothic Revival structure, but the time and the costs of acquiring the land exceeded the original budget, and a smaller post office in the Italian Renaissance Revival style was erected instead. Since 1977 it has been part of SUNY Plaza, and is used as offices by the central administration of the State University of New York (SUNY). Postal operations moved to larger facilities prior to 1972, but the building continued to house federal government offices for a few years.

The building was listed on the National Register of Historic Places in 1972. It is also a contributing property to the Downtown Albany Historic District, listed on the Register in 1980.

== Building ==
The post office building is located on the east side of the three-way intersection of Broadway and State Street. An open, grassy plaza is located to the south; otherwise the surrounding neighborhood is densely developed with commercial buildings of a comparable or greater size. Many date to the late 19th and early 20th centuries and are, like the post office, contributing properties to the Downtown Albany Historic District. Some of its neighbors are also listed on the Register themselves.

To the south a driveway curves around the plaza, around the front of the SUNY System Administration Building, listed on the Register as the Delaware and Hudson Railroad Company Building. Across Broadway, on the northwest corner, is the 1902 First Trust Company Building, also listed. The Home Savings Bank Building, Albany's first skyscraper, is a block further west.

On the north is another federal government office building; a parking garage serving the area is to the northwest. It is complemented by several small parking lots to the southwest and northwest. There is also open space in the form of small parks nearby, such as Maiden Lane Park a block to the north.

The terrain is level, reflecting the proximity of the Hudson River, 500 feet (150 m) to the east. Interstate 787 and U.S. Route 9 are between the neighborhood and the river. To the west the land begins to slope up towards the state capitol and other state-government buildings around Lafayette Park a quarter-mile (500 m) in that direction.

The building itself is faced in load-bearing granite walls. Its main block is three stories high and seven bays along Broadway by nine along State. At all four corners are towers, five stories on the northwest and four on the southwest.

Restrained ornamentation on the facades, includes shields and stars representing the United States, the building's first owner. Most of the doors and windows are within round arches, some recessed. On the west, the main entrance pavilion has clustered columns and pilasters supporting its slightly projecting balustraded roof.

At the third and (on the towers) fourth stories are belt courses of carved stone. The same material is also used on the cornices at the rooflines. All the roofs are clad in slate shingles. Between the towers, on the main block, are mansard roofs pierced by small lunette dormer windows and topped with an iron balustrade. The towers have peaked roofs with one small oculus and the same balustrade. with peaked roofs clad in slate shingles. Inside, the building has been extensively renovated for its current use. It contains 60,000 square feet (5,600 m^{2}) of office space.

== History ==
As the eastern terminus of the Erie Canal, an upper port on the Hudson River and a major rail junction, Albany had grown considerably over the course of the 19th century. Its economic activity required a significant presence of federal government agencies, and their needs had outgrown the city's available space. After the Civil War, the Treasury Department turned its attention and resources to upgrading its facilities in cities that, like Albany, had grown rapidly due to industrialization.

In 1872, Congress passed legislation authorizing the construction of the new building. It was to be primarily a post office, but large enough for other government agencies to have offices in it. The city was required to acquire the land; the total cost of the project was limited to $350,000 ($9.41 million in modern dollars).

Acquiring the site of the Exchange Building took more than half the available money. William A. Potter, then Supervising Architect of the Treasury, had designed a large, elaborate building in the High Victorian Gothic mode, with polychromatic stone siding. The lot turned out to be too small for the building, so the property of an adjacent bank was purchased for $150,000.

With more money now spent for the land than had been budgeted for the entire building, and nothing built, Congress appropriated an additional $5,000. Construction did not begin until 1879. By then, James G. Hill had become the Supervising Architect. To save money, he changed the design to the Renaissance Revival style, which he supposedly preferred, complementing its use on the state capitol up the hill to the west.

Hill kept Potter's basic forms and massing, although he changed the exterior to the simpler, cheaper gray granite. Inside, he made similar cost-driven modifications to the layout. Despite these changes, the building's final construction cost upon its 1883 completion was around $620,000 ($21.4 million in modern dollars).

In 1912 the building became part of an early urban redevelopment plan. The city's leadership had become concerned about congestion and decay downtown, especially near Water Street, where many visitors got their first impression of Albany. They hired Arnold W. Brunner, an architect and urban planner from New York, to resolve what he called "the tangle of mean streets and wretched buildings" on the waterfront.

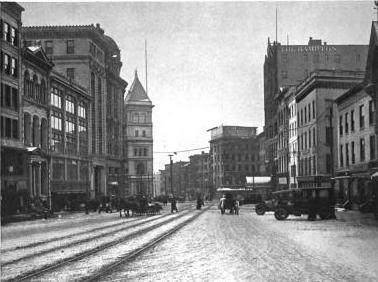
View of post office down State Street before Plaza construction

He observed that Albany, reflecting its origins as a 17th-century frontier outpost, had followed the pattern of European cities which had likewise developed during the Middle Ages, with long, narrow streets and densely clustered buildings. Those cities nevertheless often had at least one large open plaza. Brunner thus proposed that one be created downtown at the intersection of Broadway and State Street, through the construction of a long building angled back from the street. A small streetcar turnaround could be built around the edges.

The plaza would be framed by other major private and public buildings, like the post office. It would be a small version of the "court of honor" espoused for urban centers by the contemporary City Beautiful movement. The Delaware and Hudson Railroad, a major presence in the city, built the desired building, designed by local architect Marcus T. Reynolds, in 1914.

For the next 60 years the building continued to serve its original functions. In 1972 the post office and other federal agencies moved out, needing larger and newer space. The building sat empty for five years until it was acquired by SUNY, which immediately began renovating it to meet modern building codes and its own requirements. The $15 million project, which also included the more extensive renovation of the old Delaware and Hudson Building to the south, was completed the next year. The New York City architectural firm that oversaw the renovations received an energy conservation award from Owens Corning, the building insulation manufacturer.

== See also ==
- National Register of Historic Places listings in Albany, New York
