= Downtown Albany Historic District =

Historic commercial core of Albany, New York

- U.S. National Register of Historic Places
- U.S. Historic district
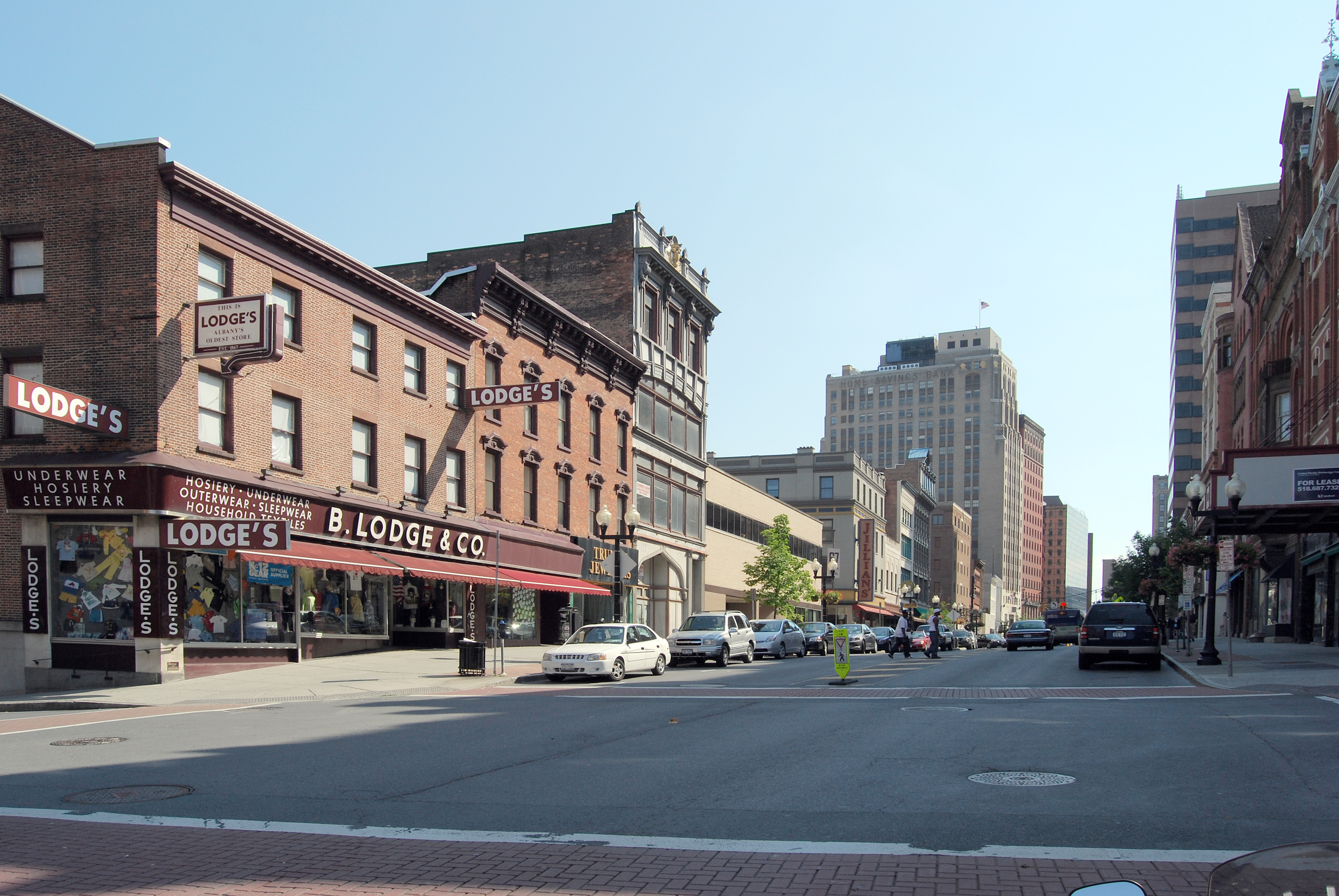
- View north along North Pearl Street (NY 32), 2009

- Location within New York Location within the United States
- Location: Broadway, State, Pine, Lodge and Columbia Sts., Albany, New York
- Coordinates: 42°38′57″N 73°45′7″W
- Area: 66.6 acres (27.0 ha)
- Architect: Multiple
- Architectural style: Late 19th And 20th Century Revivals, Late Victorian
- NRHP reference No.: 80002579 (original); 100007692 (increase)

Significant dates
- Added to NRHP: January 31, 1980
- Boundary increase: May 9, 2022

The Downtown Albany Historic District is a 19-block, 66.6-acre (27.0 ha) area of Albany, New York, United States, centered on the junction of State (New York State Route 5) and North and South Pearl streets (New York State Route 32). It is the oldest settled area of the city, originally planned and settled in the 17th century, and the nucleus of its later development and expansion. In 1980 it was designated a historic district by the city and then listed on the National Register of Historic Places.

Its 164 buildings are a mix of tall commercial buildings on the main streets and small houses on the side. Most were built between 1880 and 1930, the district's period of significance, with some dating to the 1810s. All major streets have a major building as their focal point. Several contributing properties have been listed on the Register in their own right, and one designated a National Historic Landmark. Albany's earliest skyscrapers were built here, including one that was the city's tallest at the time of its completion. The current mix of buildings reflects the city's peak of industrial prosperity in the Gilded Age, with many built by banks, as well as the city's status as New York's state capital.

It has been displaced in the city's skyline by later construction, particularly by the Empire State Plaza, the modernist home of New York's state government. Urban renewal programs of the late 20th century largely bypassed the district for political reasons. As a result, its historic buildings are mostly intact, although some have been compromised through neglect. In 2022 the state proposed some changes that would add some more modern buildings as contributing properties. The amended boundaries were accepted that May.

== Geography ==
The district is an irregular area, shaped like a rough crescent. It is centered along the axes of North and South Pearl (NY 32) and State (NY 5 west of Pearl) streets. A combination of natural features, streets, and legal boundaries serves to delineate it. Downtown is located to the northeast of and downhill from the modernist towers of Empire State Plaza, and east of the state capitol.

On the east it is bounded by the Hudson River and Interstate 787, with Eagle Street its western side (excluding City Hall, the state Court of Appeals and the county courthouse). To the north, the boundary follows Columbia Street to Chapel Street, then north to Sheridan Street. It continues east to North Pearl and then follows rear lot lines along the north side of Columbia to Broadway and out to I-787, then turns south.

At the district's southern tip, it comes inland again to Pruyn Street, which it follows for a block to Liberty Street and then turns north to Hudson Avenue, where it follows an irregular route along property lines to Norton Street. Here it continues west to South Pearl, and after a short twist to the north it follows Howard Street west. At William Street it turns south again, and then follows some property lines west to Beaver Street across from the Times Union Center. At Wendell Street it turns north to Howard and follows Howard west back to Eagle.

This area takes in 19 blocks and parts of several others. James and Steuben streets, as well as Maiden Lane, are included in their entirety along with some narrow alleys within blocks. The area is totally developed, with many multistory buildings used as office space with storefronts at street level. Open space between them and on the edges is used for parking lots. There are no significant parks or squares within it.

== History ==
Downtown has always been the center of Albany from its founding in the 17th century. Its built environment did not take its present form until the late 19th. Since then it has remained relatively stable, with some decaying buildings facing demolition pressure as part of redevelopment efforts.

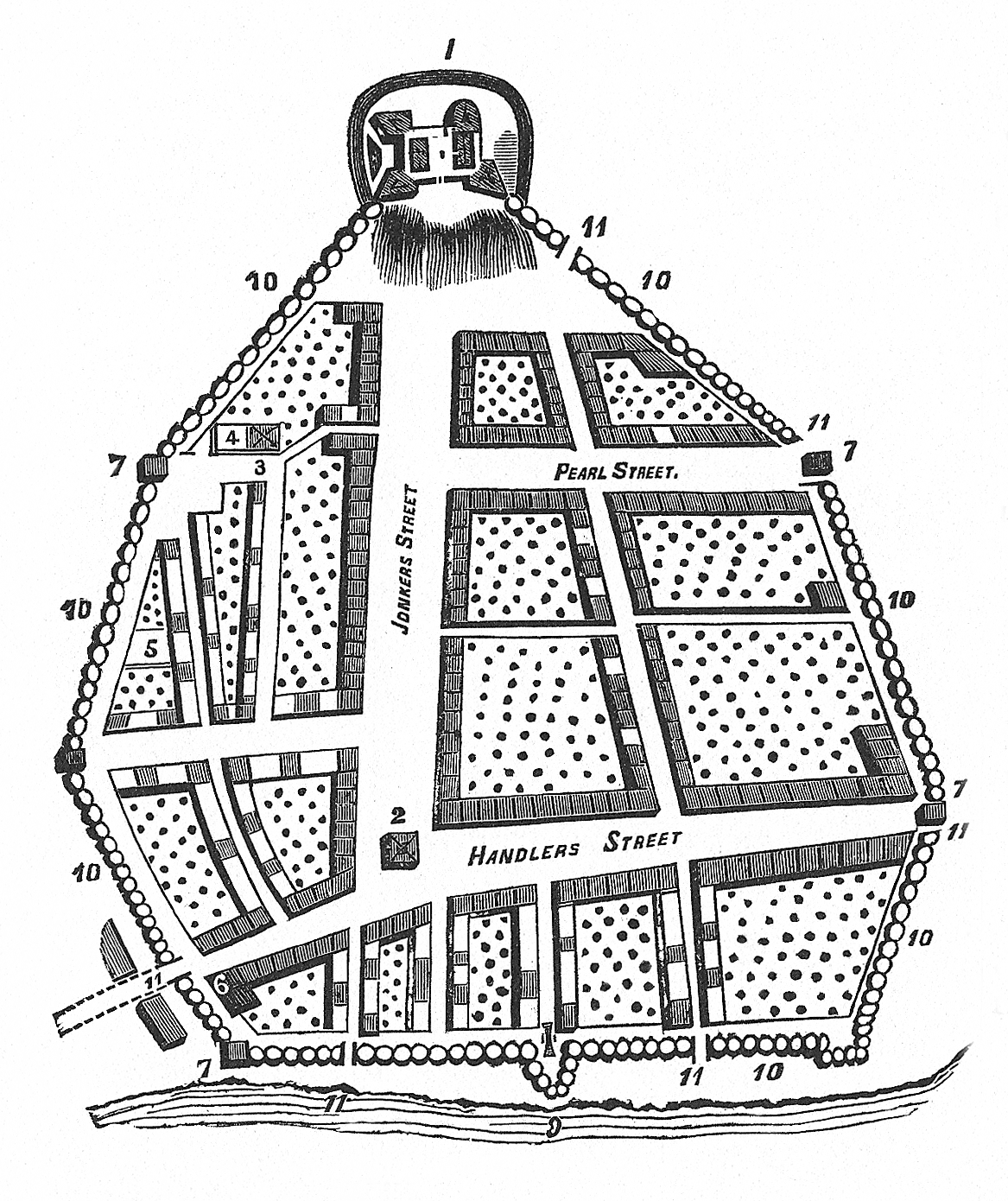
Map of Albany in late 17th century

=== Colonial and Revolutionary period ===
The area within the district was the same as that originally settled by the Dutch in the 17th century north of Fort Orange, a high area between two ravines that have since been filled in. It became British in 1664 and was renamed Albany, in honor of King James II, Duke of Albany prior to his coronation.

The grid plan of the area's streets was laid out at this time, although it was mostly unbuilt as the city was within a stockade. Most commercial buildings at the time, primarily warehouses, were located on what is now Broadway. The 1815 Coulson Building at 420 Broadway, the oldest building in the district, is typical of that kind of construction. The inland blocks were residential.

Albany was a point of contention during both the French and Indian and Revolutionary wars, and the New York State Legislature met there in 1780 after British occupation ended. In 1797 it was designated the state capital.

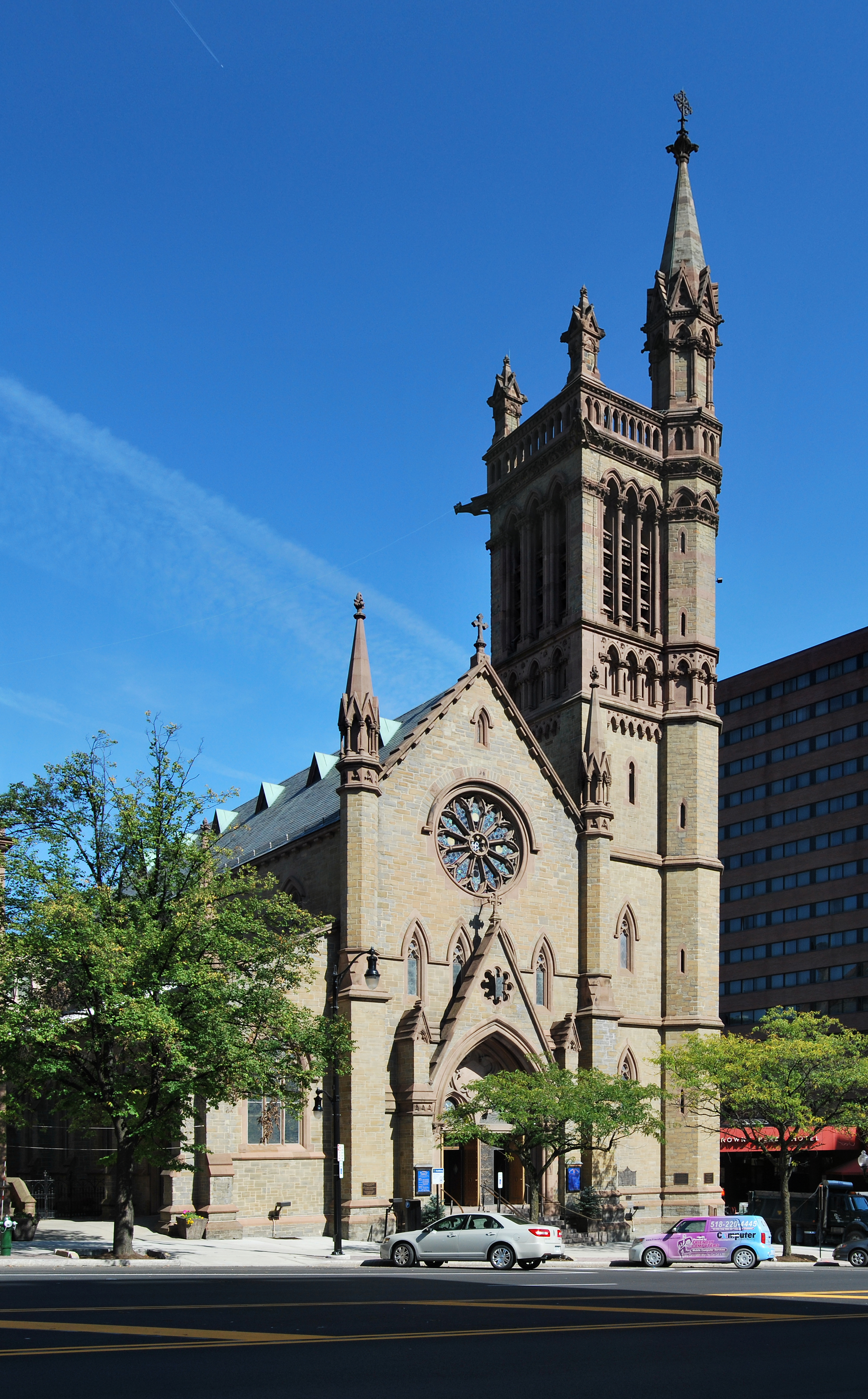
St. Peter's Church

=== 19th century ===
More residences were built, primarily to be rented to lawyers and legislators working in the capitol and the courts. The city began to expand and annex surrounding land to handle its growth. The opening of the Erie Canal in the 1820s and the development of railroads in later decades made the city a transportation hub, and as its commercial power and the state's grew it assumed more political importance. Smaller buildings remained the norm along the side streets, with churches springing up next to them. Richard Upjohn's French Gothic St. Peter's Episcopal Church on State, finished in 1860, is considered one of his best churches. Another church, St. Mary's, by the local firm of Nicholls and Brown, became the focal point of a neighborhood of small houses on and near Lodge Street. Richard Upjohn's French Gothic St. Peter's Episcopal Church on State, finished in 1860, is considered one of his best churches.

In the years after the Civil War commercial interests started building taller and more massive edifices along North Pearl and State streets. Albany native Edward Ogden designed the 1873 Kenmore Hotel on North Pearl, and expanded it in 1891 with Queen Anne touches. His 1889 Albany Business College building opposite the Kenmore likewise uses the Richardsonian Romanesque style. Another local architect, Albert Puller, had given downtown the YMCA building at 60 North Pearl, in that style three years earlier.

=== 20th century ===
The Albany architect who had the greatest impact on the district was Marcus T. Reynolds, with six buildings, most of them from the early 20th century. The most prominent is his 1914 headquarters for the Delaware and Hudson Railway on the east side of Broadway. A copy of the Cloth Hall in the Belgian city of Ypres, it has become an icon of the city, often mistaken by first-time visitors for the state capitol.

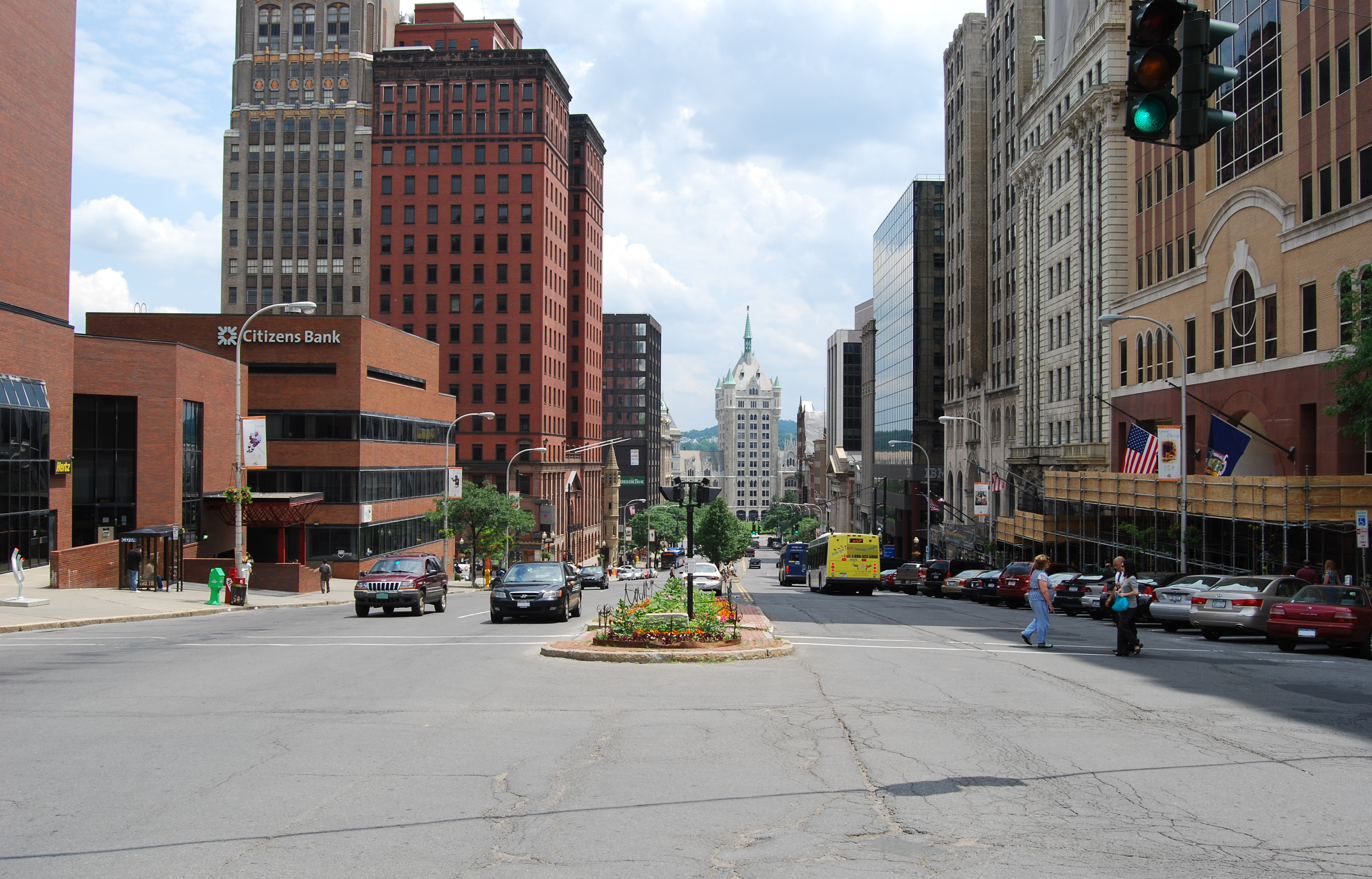
View of D&H building down State Street

It serves as a focal point when looking east down State Street. Two of Reynolds' other buildings in the district, the 1897 First Trust Company Building at State and Broadway, and the 1902 United Traction Company Building at Broadway and Columbia, similarly guide the eye down Broadway as it bends.

Architects from New York City also built in Albany. In 1875, Russell Sturgis had designed the Victorian Gothic bank building at 63 State Street, and it was paired with a neoclassical bank building by York and Sawyer a quarter-century later at 60 State. Henry Ives Cobb incorporated the 1803 façade of Philip Hooker's State Bank of Albany building into a 16-story office building at North Pearl and State. Near the end of the period of significance, Dennison and Hiron's Art Deco Home Savings Bank Building was the tallest in Albany at the time of its 1927 completion. It was quickly displaced from that title by the state government's Alfred E. Smith Building the next year.

No major building took place downtown in the 1930s due to the combination of it being built out and the slowdown in construction occasioned by the onset of the Great Depression. When the economy regained its footing after World War II, the focus of new development had shifted to outlying areas and then the suburbs. Downtown remained a popular place for politicians and those who associated with them to patronize, but otherwise began to decline in a similar fashion as other old Northeastern cities.

A 1969 redevelopment plan identified the "obsolete street plan" and lack of quality parking as a source of downtown's problems. It proposed reconfiguring the streets to coordinate better with the expressways proposed for the area at the time. A large pedestrian mall was proposed for the area between Chapel and Broadway, with the intervening blocks of Steuben, Pearl and Pine to be closed off to vehicles. A platform was to cross the interstate and provide a pedestrian link to marinas and apartments along the river. To make up for the lost streets, Chapel would have become North Pearl, and a bridge would be built to extend Eagle Street to Clinton Avenue at Ten Broeck Street. Eventually, it was hoped, a people mover system would be built to link Empire Plaza and downtown, with new parking garages on the fringes, one of which would have required rerouting Liberty Street and Hudson Avenue.

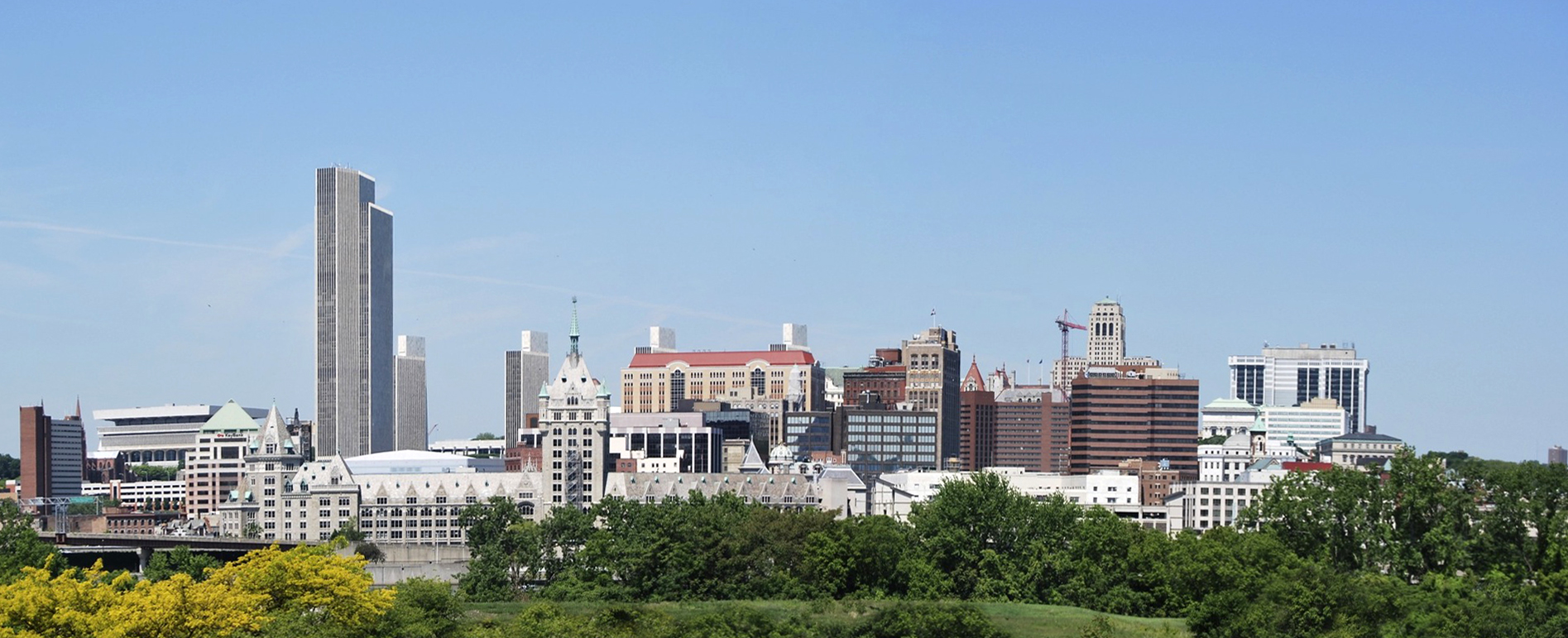
2009 view of downtown from across river, overshadowed by Empire State Plaza

The old buildings were spared the fate of demolition through urban renewal as the city's political machine under Daniel P. O'Connell mostly eschewed the federal funding for such projects since the federal government would award contracts, limiting the city machine's patronage. New development in the center of Albany instead took the form of what was originally known as the "South Mall Project" proposed by Governor Nelson Rockefeller. This cleared 98 acres (40 ha) southwest of downtown for a complex centered on five tall state office buildings in high modernist style. When completed in the late 1970s, Empire State Plaza became the new centerpiece of the city's skyline, and Erastus Corning Tower its tallest building. The Delaware and Hudson moved out of its building following the decline in its industry, and after a few years of vacancy it was purchased by the state to become the main headquarters of the State University of New York.

=== 21st century ===
In the late 1980s Sebba Rockaway, a British developer, proposed to demolish a row of buildings, all contributing, at 136–40 State Street and replace them with a 14-story office complex. Preservationists objected, but the city granted permission. The project was later canceled when Sebba failed to find tenants for the property. A decade later, it put forth a similar expanded proposal, which would have demolished not only the original properties but the long-vacant Wellington Row which includes the Wellington and Berkshire hotels, as well as the former Albany Elks lodge.

This time the preservationists sued the city to stop the demolition. The buildings continued to deteriorate, and in 2004 a section of State Street was closed since part of the Wellington's cornice was in danger of falling into it. A new owner, Columbia Development Companies, bought the properties and finally reached a compromise that preserved the façades of the Wellington and the other State Street buildings, with the new office building to rise behind them. Demolition began in 2009.

New construction or expansion within the district is reviewed by the city's Historic Resources Commission (HRC), a group of nine citizens with an interest in architecture, history or historic preservation appointed by the mayor. The HRC also considers new city landmark designations. The area also comes under the purview of several of Albany's neighborhood associations.

In 2022, the state proposed to the National Park Service (NPS) some changes to the district as a result of additional research into its history and developments since then, which were accepted in May. At the time of the original nomination the period of significance ended at 1928; the new research took into account the period of mid-20th century urban renewal and construction from that era and extend that period to 1973. In addition to fuller histories for some existing pre-1928 contributing properties such as the Home Savings Bank Building, the boundary increase added the Park Mart at North Pearl and Van Tromp streets, itself listed on the Register in 2021. It had been deliberately excluded at the time the district was designated but now reflects that era of its history; similarly the equally modernist former Adirondack Trailways bus terminal at Broadway and Division, near the south end of the district, is now considered contributing, along with a small brick late 1940s commercial building at 55 Columbia Street and the IBM service building at 119 State Street.

Along the southern boundary, a lot on the south side of Beaver Street near the south end of Lodge has been removed from the district as the building on it was demolished to make way for MVP Arena. At the eastern corner, an area taking in three c. 1875 rowhouses on the west side of Eagle Street near the Beaver intersection, along with the 1960s office building north of them with the official address of 145–150 State Street, were added to the district.

== Significant contributing properties ==
Six of the district's properties are listed on the National Register in their own right, and one is a National Historic Landmark. There are several others that are notable.

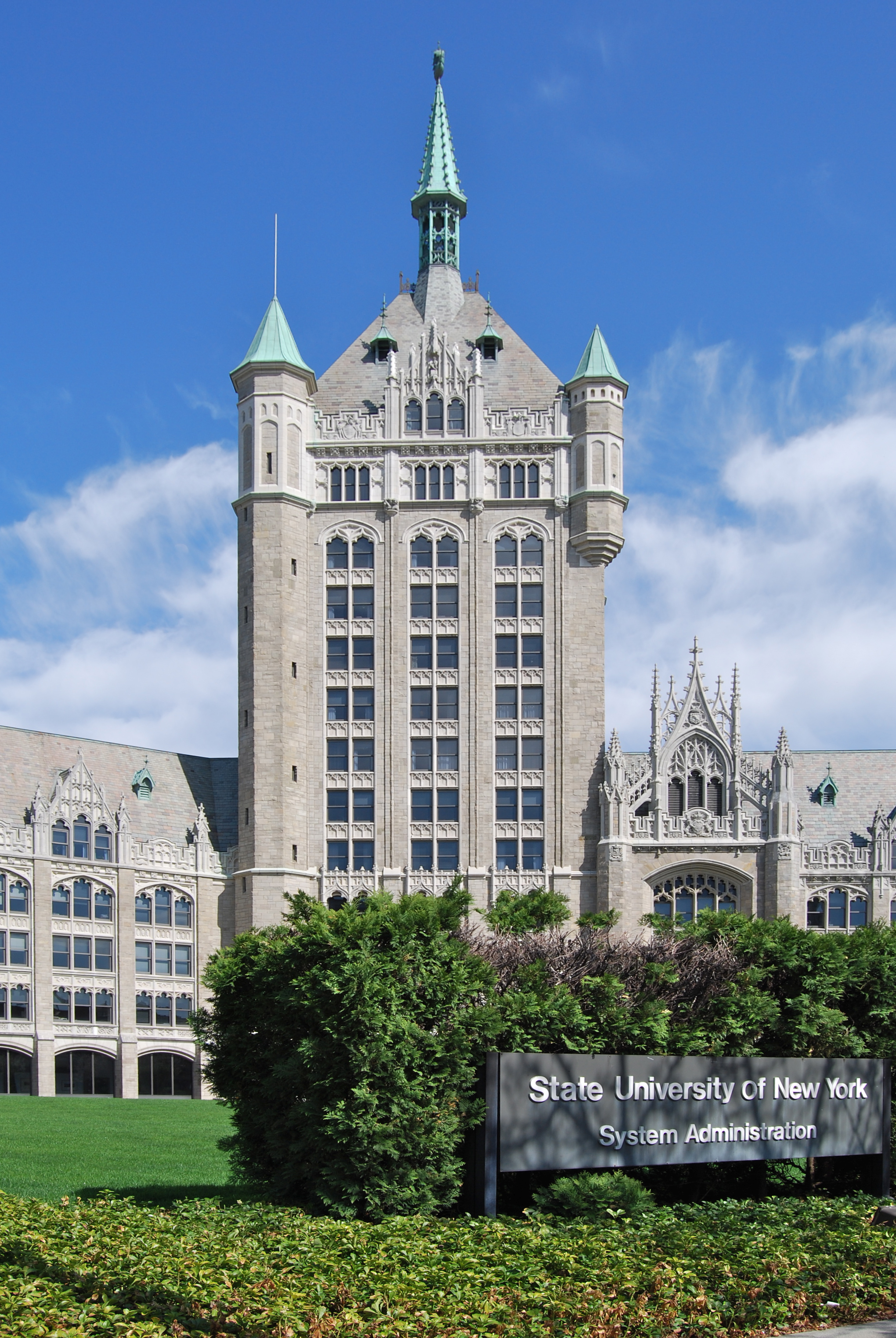
The D&H Building

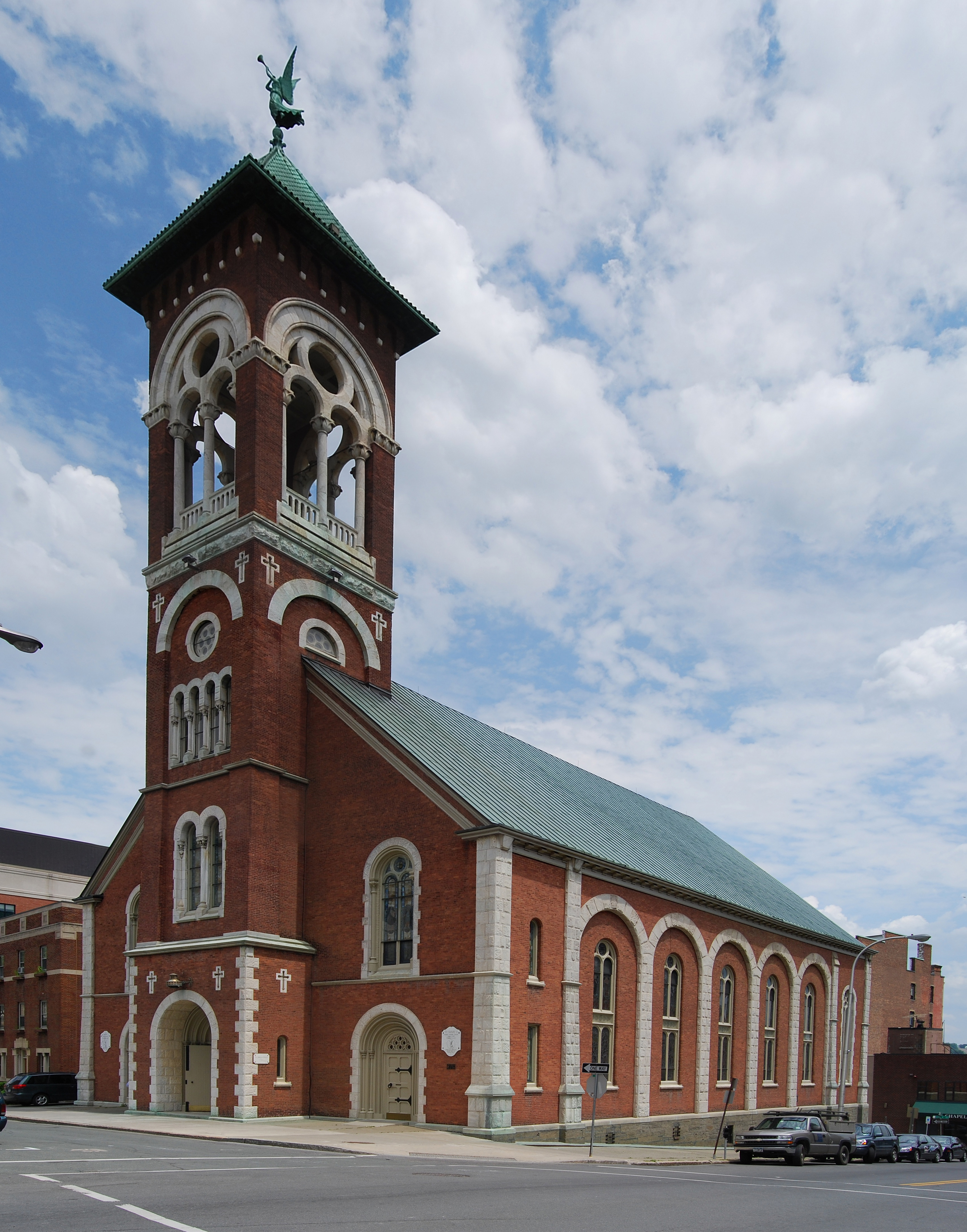
St. Mary's Church

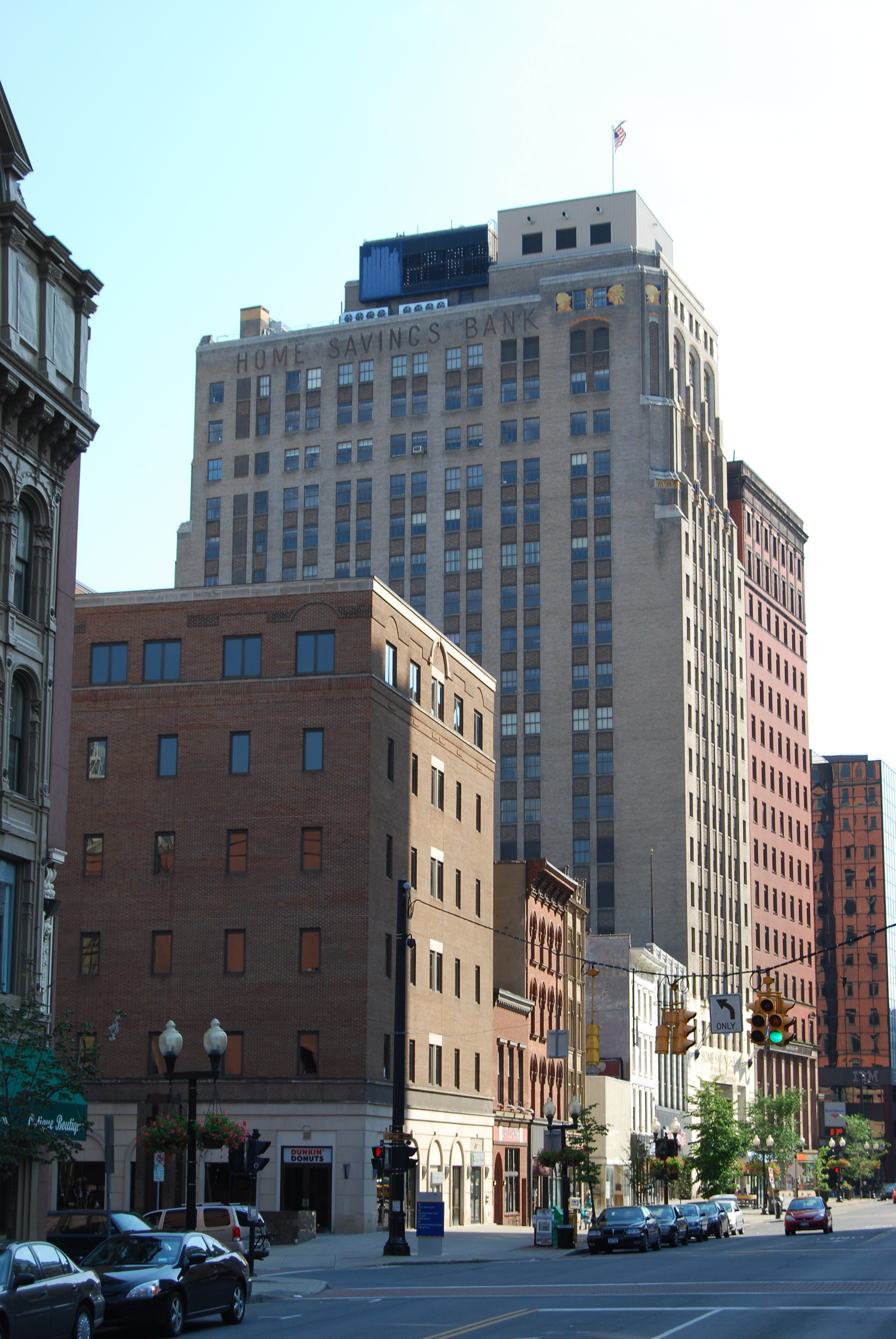
Home Savings Bank Building

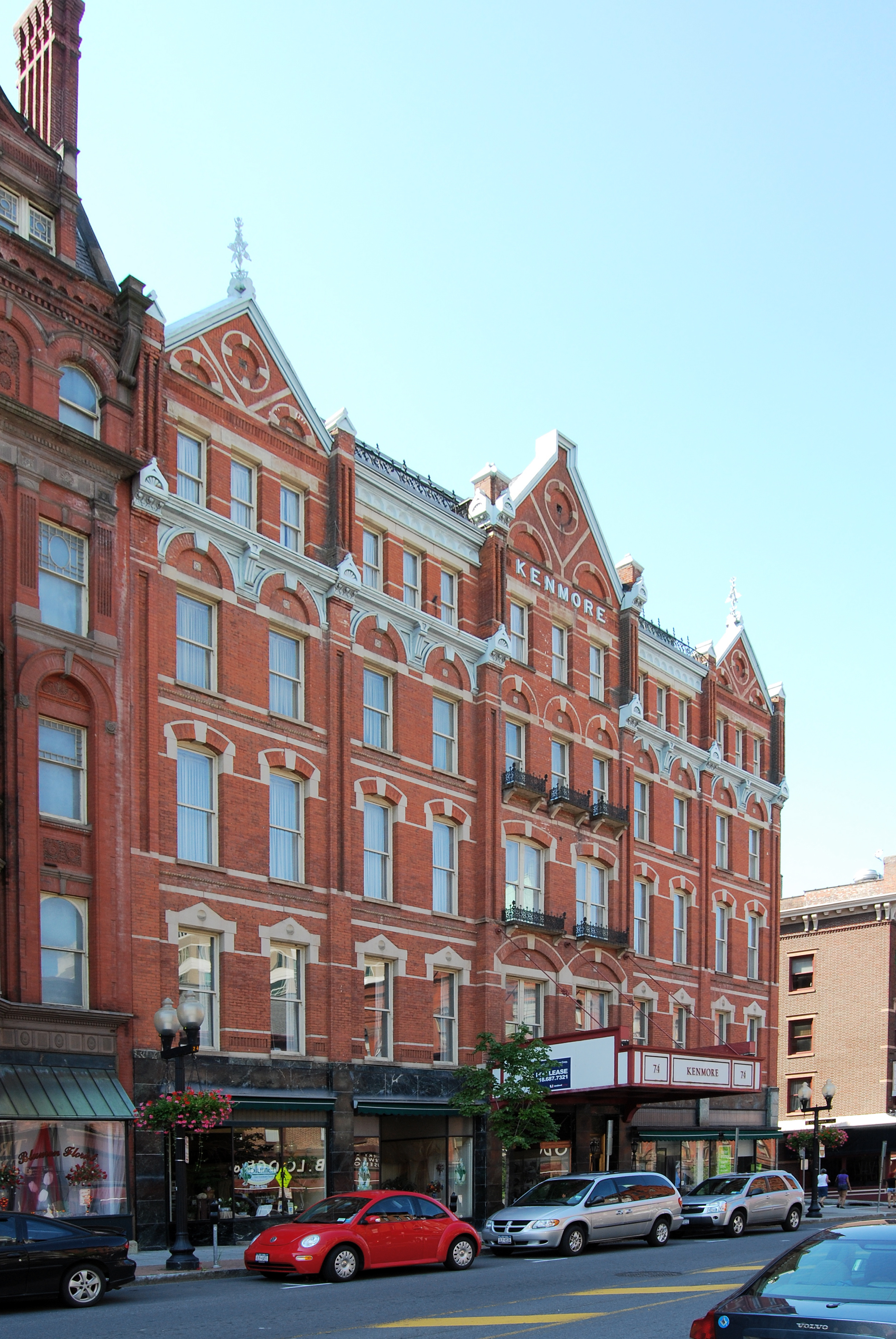
Kenmore Hotel

=== National Historic Landmark ===
- St. Peter's Episcopal Church, 107 State Street. Richard Upjohn and his son designed this church completed in 1860, for a congregation founded in 1704. It is in French Gothic revival style and considered one of his best churches. The remains of Lord Howe were interred under the vestibule; he is the only British Lord buried in the United States. It was listed on the Register in 1972 and then designated an NHL eight years later.

=== National Register of Historic Places ===
- Delaware and Hudson Railroad Company Building, Broadway and State Street. Currently used as the headquarters of the State University of New York, this is downtown Albany's best-known building. It may have been inspired by the 13th-century Flemish Gothic Cloth Hall in Ypres, Belgium; built in 1913 by local architect Marcus F. Gilbert.
- James T. Foley United States Courthouse, 445 Broadway, built 1931–1934 in the Art Deco style.
- Old Post Office, Broadway and State Street. The Renaissance Revival design of this 1883 post office was a less expensive substitute for the larger structure originally planned before the land turned out to be far more expensive than expected.
- First Trust Company Building, Broadway and State. A 1902 Gilbert building in the classic Beaux Arts style.
- St. Mary's Church, 10 Lodge Street. When built in 1869 by Nichols and Brown, this third building to house the city's oldest Catholic church was an early application of the Romanesque Revival. Upon completion of its 175-foot (53 m) tower in the 1890s it became the first Albany church with electric lighting.
- United Traction Company Building, Broadway and Columbia. 1902 Beaux Arts Gilbert building that also serves as a focal point going down Columbia Street.
- Van Ostrande–Radliff House oldest building in Albany, added to register in 2008.
- YMCA Building, 60 North Pearl. An 1886 Richardsonian Romanesque building by Albert Fuller.

=== Other notable buildings ===
- Coulson Building, 420 Broadway. This warehouse, built in 1815 and expanded later in the century.
- Home Savings Bank Building. A 1927 Art Deco skyscraper that was Albany's tallest when built by Denisson and Hirons. It is one of the newest contributing properties in the district.
- Kenmore Hotel, Columbia and North Pearl Street. With the demolition or redevelopment of the other hotels, this Edward Ogden-designed 1873 building, renovated 13 years later, is the only one of downtown's 19th-century hotels remaining mostly intact. It has been an office building since 1986.
- National State Bank Building, 60 State Street. A Classical Revival "temple of finance" designed by York and Sawyer in 1901.
- R.B. Wing Building, 384 Broadway. Local architect Walter Van Guysling's Dutch Colonial Revival building brought that style back to the district in 1913.
- Albany Masonic Temple, the oldest continuously owned Masonic property in the United States.

== See also ==
- History of Albany, New York
- National Register of Historic Places listings in Albany, New York
