= Bank of Greene County =

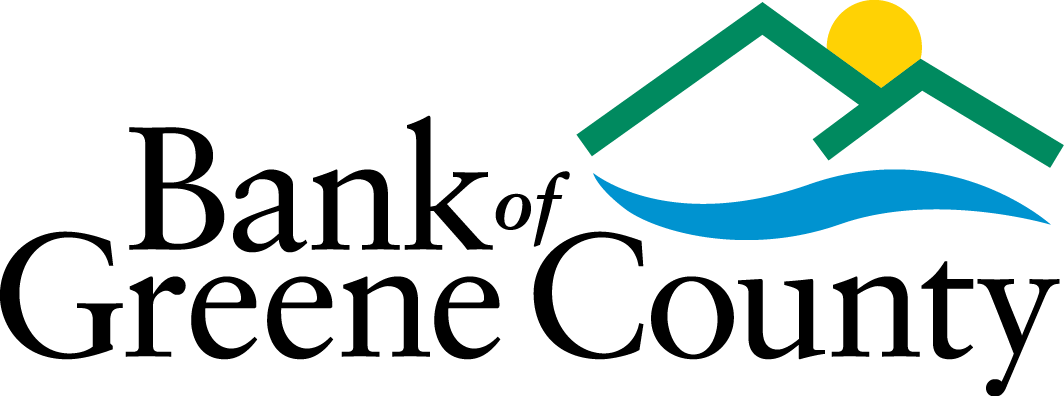
- Company type: Public
- Traded as: Nasdaq: GCBC
- Industry: Financial services
- Founded: January 22, 1889; 137 years ago, in Catskill, NY
- Headquarters: 302 Main St., Catskill, NY 12414, United States
- Key people: Donald E. Gibson (president & CEO)
- Products: Banking
- Net income: US$24,769 (2024)
- Total assets: US$2,825,788 (2024)
- Website: www.tbogc.com

Bank of Greene County is an American federally-chartered savings bank headquartered in Catskill, NY. The bank's branches are located in the Upstate New York counties of Greene, Columbia, Albany, Ulster, and Rensselaer.

Donald E. Gibson is the current President and CEO, as of 2007.

== History ==
The bank was initially founded on January 22, 1889, as the Building & Loan Association of Catskill. Thomas E. Ferrier, Catskill Town Supervisor and owner of a brickyard and knitting mill, was elected as the Association's first President. In 1911, the Building and Loan Association of Catskill changed its name to the Catskill Savings & Loan Association (CS&LA), and began accepting savings deposits.

In 1930, the CS&LA purchased its first building, located at 389 Main Street in Catskill, NY, for $15,000. In 1940, total assets reached $1 million for the first time in the organization's history. In 1963, the CS&LA moved to a location at 425 Main Street in Catskill, with a full-service office and a drive-up window. In 1974, the Catskill Savings & Loan Association converted to a state-chartered savings bank and changed its name to Greene County Savings Bank, opening its first dedicated branch in Coxsackie.

J. Bruce Whittaker became President of the Greene County Savings Bank in 1987.

In 1998, The Greene County Savings Bank changed its name to The Bank of Greene County and went public, establishing a holding company – Greene County Bancorp, Inc. The bank also established a Charitable Foundation to support education, the arts, affordable housing, and other causes. To date the Charitable Foundation has donated $2.9 million to non-profit organizations in New York's Hudson Valley and Capital Region.

In 1999, the bank's common stock was approved for listing on NASDAQ under the symbol GCBC. The bank also purchased and renovated a historic art deco building at 302 Main Street, moving their administrative headquarters to the new building. Built in 1931 as the Cooperative Insurance Building, it was designed by architect E. P. Valkenburgh of Middletown. Over the next few years, new branches would be opened in Tannersville, Westerlo, Hudson, Catskill, Greenport, Chatham, Ravena, Germantown, Kingston, Copake, Woodstock, and Albany. The existing Coxsackie and Cairo branches were also moved and expanded.

In 2006, the bank established its operations department at 288 Main Street in Catskill. The location was formerly a livery and car dealership.

J. Bruce Whittaker retired on June 30, 2007, after 20 years as president and CEO. He was succeeded by Donald Gibson, who started with the bank in 1987, and was promoted to senior vice president of commercial and retailing banking in 2003.

In 2013, the bank established its lending center at 341 Main Street in Catskill. Built in 1909 by American architect Marcus T. Reynolds, the building was formerly the Catskill Savings Bank. In 2014, the building was added to the Greene County Historical Register.

In late 2014, the bank announced its first Ulster County Branch location in Kingston, NY, which opened in early 2015. The Bank opened its second Ulster County location, in Woodstock, in the fall of 2018.

On February 17, 2016, Greene County Bancorp, Inc. (GCBC) declared a 2-for-1 stock split on outstanding common stock. The stock split essentially gave shareholders of record 2 shares for every 1 share owned, and halved the stock price at the time of the split.

In June 2016, GCBC stock was included in the FTSE Russell 3000 for the first time. In 2022, the GCBC stock was included in the Russell 2000 Index for the first time.

In 2020, during the COVID-19 pandemic the bank processed Paycheck Protection Program (PPP) applications for Upstate New York businesses. The PPP loans were a part of the CARES Act, which was used to help businesses continue their payroll during periods of shutdown. In 2021, Senator Michelle Hinchey presented the bank with the New York State Empire Award for their community support during the pandemic including PPP.

In 2020, the bank opened its third location in Albany County, on Wolf Road in the Town of Colonie. The bank moved its Customer Service Center to a stand-alone building in the Fall of 2021. In 2023, the bank opened its East Greenbush branch, the first located in Rensselaer County. In 2024, the bank opened the Capital Region Banking Center, its first non-branch office outside of Catskill.

In 2023, the bank opened its wealth management center at 345 Main Street in Catskill, the former Tanners Bank Building. The bank was also added to the New York State Historic Business Preservation Registry.

In 2024, the bank recognized its 135th anniversary and 25th year of being traded on the Nasdaq by ringing the closing bell in Times Square. The bank had opened the Nasdaq before in 2009 and 2014 for its 120th and 125th anniversaries.
