= United Traction Company Building =

Historic commercial building in New York, United States

- U.S. National Register of Historic Places
- U.S. Historic district – Contributing property
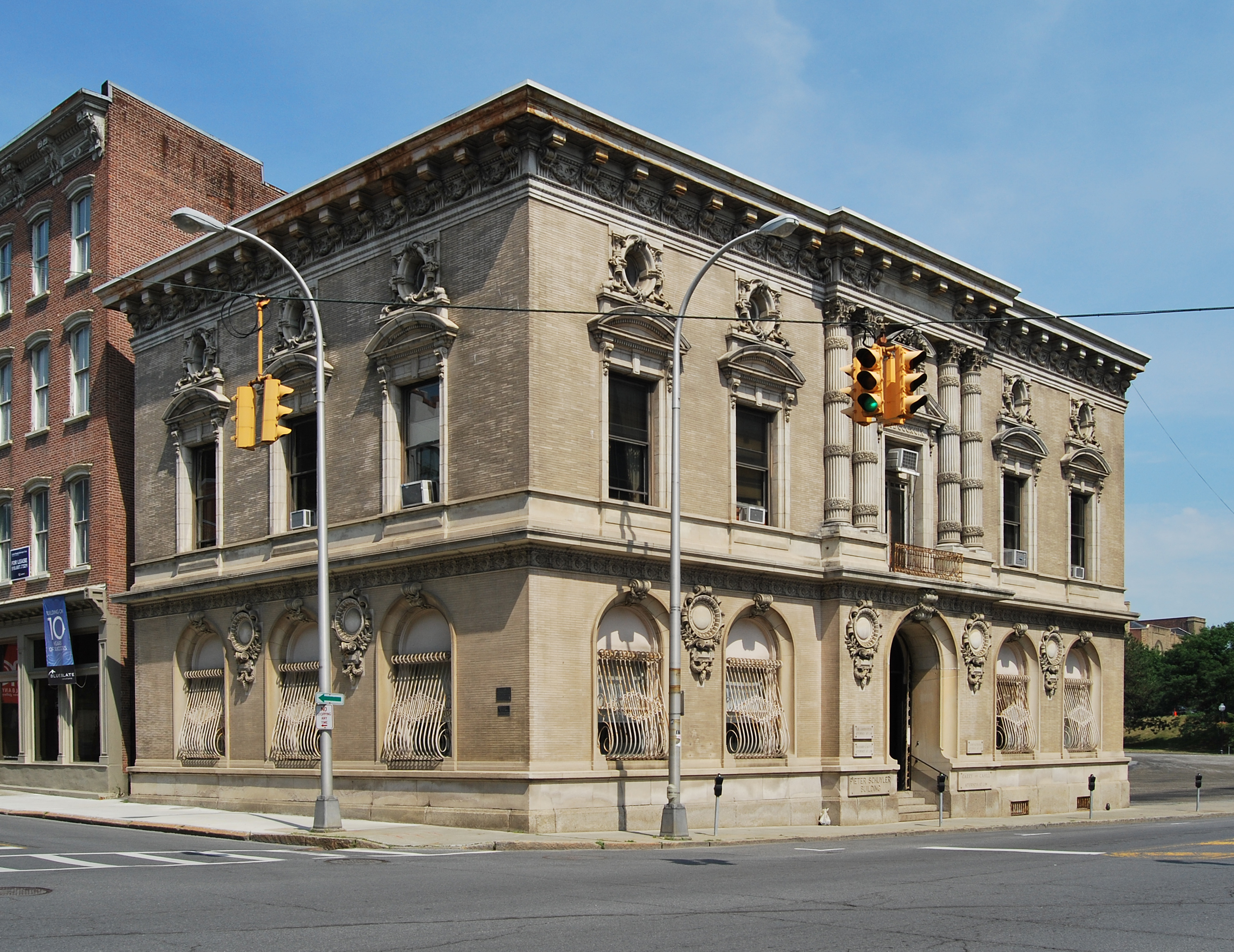
- South profile and east elevation, 2011

- Location within New York Location within the United States
- Location: Albany, New York
- Coordinates: 42°39′7″N 73°44′59″W
- Area: 1.1 acres (4,500 m^{2})
- Built: 1899
- Architect: Marcus T. Reynolds
- Architectural style: Renaissance
- Part of: Downtown Albany Historic District
- NRHP reference No.: 76001205
- Added to NRHP: May 24, 1976

The United Traction Company Building is located on Broadway in Albany, New York, United States. It is a brick building by local architect Marcus T. Reynolds in the Renaissance Revival architectural style, constructed at the end of the 19th century. In 1976 it was added to the National Register of Historic Places. Four years later it was included as a contributing property when the Downtown Albany Historic District was listed on the Register.

It was the headquarters of United Traction, which at the time of its construction operated the city's trolley system. Architecturally it complemented the nearby Union Station, and the two served as the gateway to the city for visitors. Although it eventually switched to operating buses, United Traction remained in the building until the 1950s, when it became part of the Capital District Transportation Authority. It is currently used for other business purposes.

== Building ==
The building sits on a corner lot of just over an acre (4,500 m²) at the northwest corner of Broadway and Columbia Street, one block south of where U.S. Route 9 exits from Interstate 787 a block to the east along the Hudson River. The surrounding neighborhood is a densely developed urban center. To the north of the building is a parking lot; across Broadway is a tall office building used as the headquarters of the New York State Department of Environmental Conservation. To the west are some slightly taller commercial buildings. Across Columbia Street is the small Tricentennial Park. The former Albany Union Station is on the southeast. The terrain is level, sloping up on the west side slightly.

Although the building is trapezoidal, it appears rectangular from the street. It is a two-story steel frame structure on a stone foundation faced in beige brick with a flat roof, five bays along the west (front) elevation on Broadway, and three on the south along Columbia. The two sides facing the streets have ornamentation in stone and terra cotta.

On both facades, the windows are recessed in round-arched openings topped by scrolled keystones. Between them are large cartouches. A decorated frieze runs below the cornice which separates the two floors. The second floor functions as a piano nobile. Its windows are in rectangular recessed openings topped by segmental pediments and recessed oval attic windows. All the lower stories have one-over-one double-hung sash windows. At the roof a corbeled cornice above a frieze supports wide overhanging eaves.

The centrally located main entrance is in a slightly projecting pavilion on both stories. It, too, has a recessed round-arched entrance, flanked by cartouches, with a small set of steps. Below them are stone plaques on the foundation with the words "United Traction Company". Its treatment is otherwise the same as the rest of the first story. Above it is a balcony flanked by two round fluted and vermiculated columns with Corinthian capitals ending at the roofline frieze.

Inside the building has been altered considerably, but many original finishes remain under their replacements. The first floor has an oval central hall with a colored marble floor and marble walls with rosettes. An archway leads to stairs with marble floors and an ornate metal railing. Some rooms on the first floor retain their original stonework, such as patterned floors and wall paneling. The rooms on the upper floors have minimal decoration.

== History ==
Horse-drawn trolley service began in Albany in 1864. The vehicles were operated by the Albany Railway Company, which began to introduce electric trolleys in 1890. By 1899 it was successful enough to commission Marcus T. Reynolds to design its headquarters, and around the time it moved in it changed its name to the United Traction Company. His Renaissance Revival design was possibly inspired by an Italian palazzo. It was a smaller complement to the equally unrestrained Union Station across the intersection, and both buildings were thus the first experience of Albany's architecture for many visitors.

The rise of the automobile led to the decline of trolley systems nationwide. In the 1930s United Traction gradually began to switch from trolleys to buses. The last one was taken out of service in 1946. The company remained in the building until 1950. After later financial struggles, it was one of several private bus companies absorbed into the new, public Capital District Transportation Authority in the early 1970s. The building is the sole reminder of the company's existence today.

== See also ==
- National Register of Historic Places listings in Albany, New York
