= Kenmore Hotel =

Hotel in Albany, New York, United States

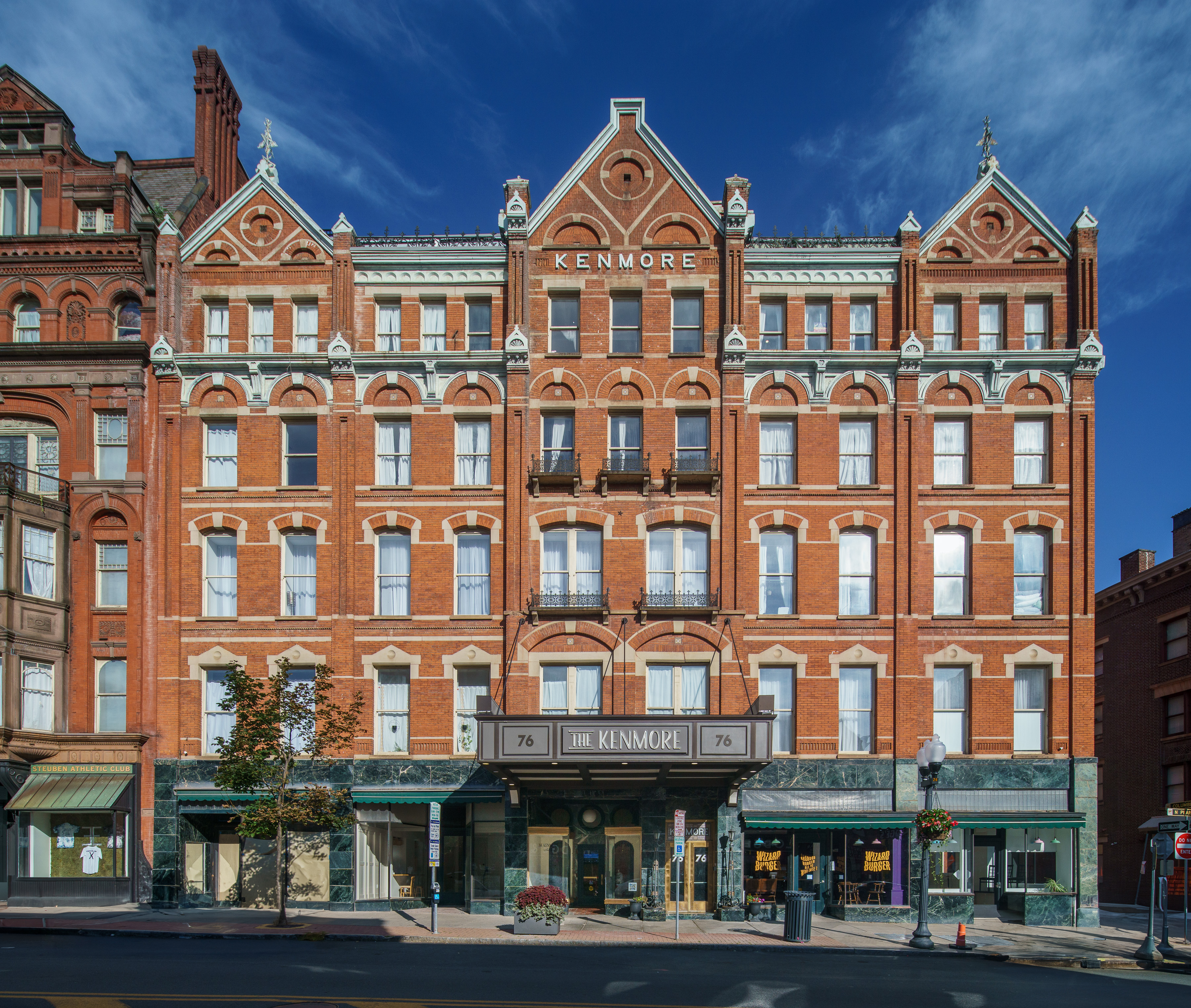
- Kenmore Hotel in 2021

General information
- Architectural style: Victorian and Queen Anne
- Location: Albany, New York, 74 North Pearl Street
- Completed: 1878
- Renovated: 1986
- Owner: Historic Redevelopment Associates

Technical details
- Floor count: 6

Design and construction
- Architect: Edward Ogden

The Kenmore Hotel is a historic building at 74 North Pearl Street (NY 32) in the city of Albany, New York.

== History ==
The Kenmore was built in 1878 by an African-American, Adam Blake (April 6, 1830 – September 7, 1881), and owned by him until his death, at which time it was taken over by his widow Catherine, who continued until 1887.

Adam Blake was named for his father, a slave of General Stephen Van Rensselaer III at the Manor House. Adam Blake, Jr., was considered a "worthy and respected citizen, and first-class caterer for the public" and as the "richest and best-known business man of his race" in Albany County. Blake had owned the hotel Congress Hall on the corner of Washington Avenue and Park Street until it was demolished by the state of New York to make way for the new New York State Capitol building in 1878. Blake then had the Kenmore built on the corner of North Pearl Street and Columbia Street.

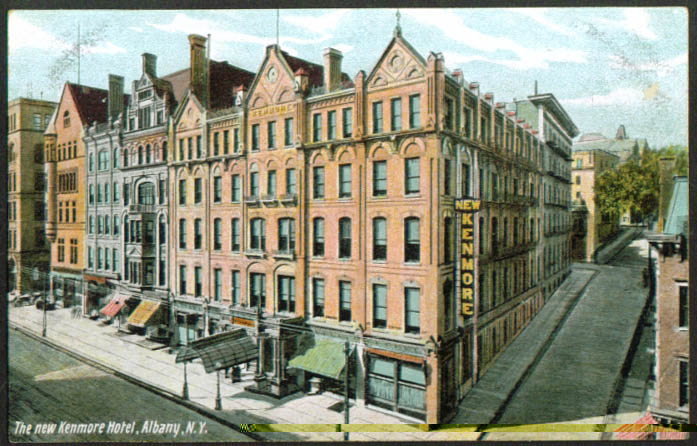
The southwestern block of North Pearl and Columbia streets with the Kenmore Hotel in the 1910s.

In the 1940s the Rain-Bo Room was a famous nightclub in the hotel; it was named for the Rainbow Room in the GE Building of Rockefeller Center in the city of New York. Gangster Jack “Legs” Diamond frequented the hotel and had partied at the Rain-Bo the night of his death after having been acquitted of theft in the nearby city of Troy. The Kenmore Hotel features prominently in many of William Kennedy's books, including his novel Legs about the life of Jack Diamond. The hotel can be seen in the 1969 cult classic film The Honeymoon Killers.

The building was renovated in 1986 into an office building by Walter Uccellini Enterprises (now Historic Redevelopment Associates). After the renovation there was a total of 87,475 square feet (8,126.7 m^{2}) of rentable space. The major tenant, from 1986 until 1999, was the Healthcare Association of New York State, which occupied 62,000 square feet (5,800 m^{2}) on four of the six floors of the building. The first major event held in the building after renovation was the 13th annual conference of the Preservation League of New York State, on April 18, 1986. In May 2008 a new nightclub was proposed for the Kenmore. The nightclub, called The Terrace Lounge at The Kenmore, was to be on the ground floor and not in the two story former Rain-bo Room. The Kenmore Hotel building was listed for sale in 2016.

=== Kenmore Ballroom ===
In 2019, developers renovated the historic Rain-Bo Room, restoring the historic staircase and opening up 25-foot ceilings and an upper level mezzanine. The rechristened Kenmore Ballroom is available for weddings, events, and receptions.

== See also ==
- History of Albany, New York
- Downtown Albany Historic District
