= Wellington Row =

Row of buildings on State Street in Albany, New York

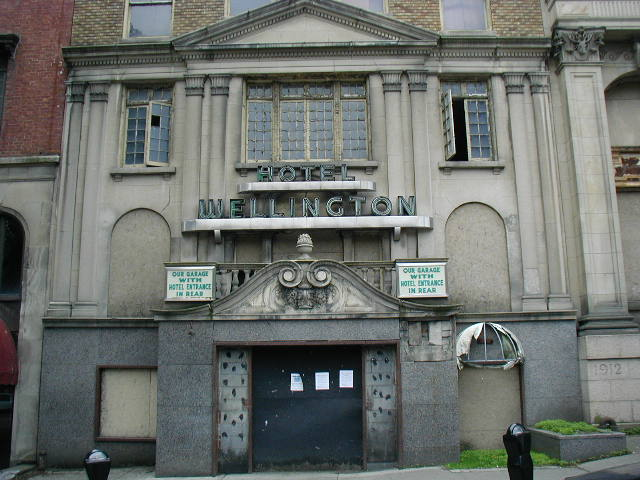
State Street entrance to the Wellington Hotel in 2006 prior to demolition.

Wellington Row is a row of buildings along the south side of State Street in Albany, New York. It spans from 132 to 140 State Street and includes the Wellington Hotel, its namesake, the former Elks Lodge No. 49, former Berkshire Hotel, and a couple of row houses south of the Wellington Hotel (132 and 134 State Street). The Wellington Hotel included a second building called the Wellington Annex on Howard Street with an attached garage that both faced towards the back of Wellington Row. The row was placed on the Preservation League of New York State's Seven to Save list for the year 2000. The entire row is part of the Downtown Albany Historic District.

== History ==
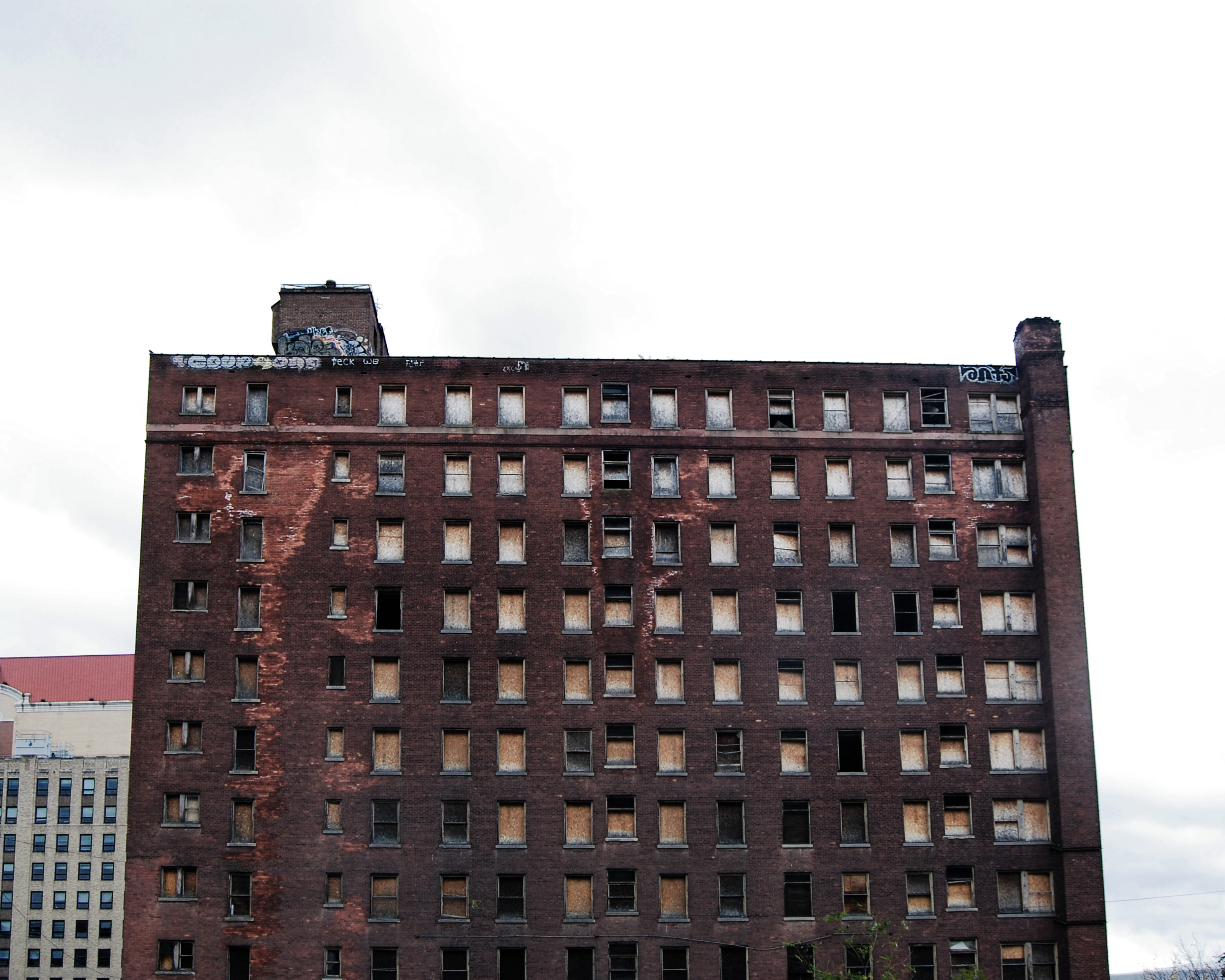
Wellington Hotel Annex, built on Howard Street facing the back of the Wellington

The oldest building in Wellington Row, and possibly all of State Street, is the John Taylor Cooper House at 134 State Street. The house was built in the 1820s and remodeled into a Greek Revival house for Cooper, of the family that founded Cooperstown, New York. Christian Brothers Academy occupied 132 State Street. The Wellington Hotel was built in 1905 as a 17-room hotel, then in 1911 it was purchased by Claude J. Holder who expanded the building to over 400 rooms. At 138 State Street, west of the Wellington, the Elks Lodge No. 49 was built between 1911 and 1913 and dedicated in 1914. In 1959 Carter Hotels bought the building from Holder's heirs for $1.5 million with the stipulation that they put televisions and air conditioning in every room. Governor of New York Mario Cuomo first moved into the Wellington in 1956 when he was a law clerk, and then again in the 1980s as Lieutenant Governor of New York. Cuomo's successor as governor, George Pataki, also stayed at the hotel while he was an assemblyman in the New York Legislature. In 1975 Albany Savings Bank after foreclosing on the building gave the Wellington to the city, which continued to run the building as a hotel and the annex on Howard Street as a dormitory for students at the University at Albany until 1984. In 1984 MABS Diversified Investments purchased the building from the city and also bought the neighboring Elks Lodge and former Berkshire Hotel, MABS continued the hotel and student housing until 1986. Sebba Rockaway Ltd. purchased the Wellington, Berkshire, and Elks Lodge in 1987 and then also neighboring 134 State Street in 1994 and 132 State Street in 1998.

On August 17, 2004, the ornate cornice atop the building was seen leaning perilously over State Street and emergency workers had to remove it. Instead of demolition the city decided to wrap the rest of the building in protective sheathing. The city took Sebba Rockaway to court for 17 code violations. City court in December 2004 fined the company $480,000 for a dozen code violations and dismissed five. The city in 2005 sued Sebba Rockaway for $25 million in punitive damages and tacked $513,000 onto the property tax bill for the Wellington Hotel. Sebba Rockaway then put all its property on Wellington Row including the Wellington, Berkshire, Elks Lodge and adjoining buildings for sale for $5 million. The entire site was sold in 2006 to Columbia Development, a locally owned company, for $925,000, which originally wanting to destroy most of the buildings and save only a few facades. After meeting some opposition Columbia revised their proposal with saving more of the original streetscape though most will still be new construction. The proposal received praises for the inclusion of apartments along with office space as this has been a goal of the city of Albany for quite some time. The two buildings east of the Wellington Hotel along with the Berkshire Hotel and Elks Lodge west of the Wellington will be saved as retail and residential uses, but the Wellington Hotel itself will be demolished and rebuilt with just its facade as the entrance to a new 14-story 405,000-square-foot (37,600 m^{2}) office building that will span behind the entire row, which was renamed Wellington Place.

== Wellies ==
The Wellington Hotel prior to the start of demolition was home to feral cats, many of whom had never had contact with humans. The vast majority are of the black and white "tuxedo" variety. The organization Spaying Capital Region Unowned Feral Felines (Scruff) captured, neutered/spayed, vaccinated them, and then released them back into downtown with locals either willing to keep an eye on them or adopt them. Many of the cats were given names with the surname of Wellington, such as Mario Wellington (named for former governor Mario Cuomo), and Claude Wellington. The Wellington Hotel Annex was demolished explosively on August 23, 2014.
