= SUNY Plaza =

Historic commercial building in New York, United States

- Delaware and Hudson; Railroad Company Building (SUNY Plaza)
- U.S. National Register of Historic Places
- U.S. Historic district – Contributing property
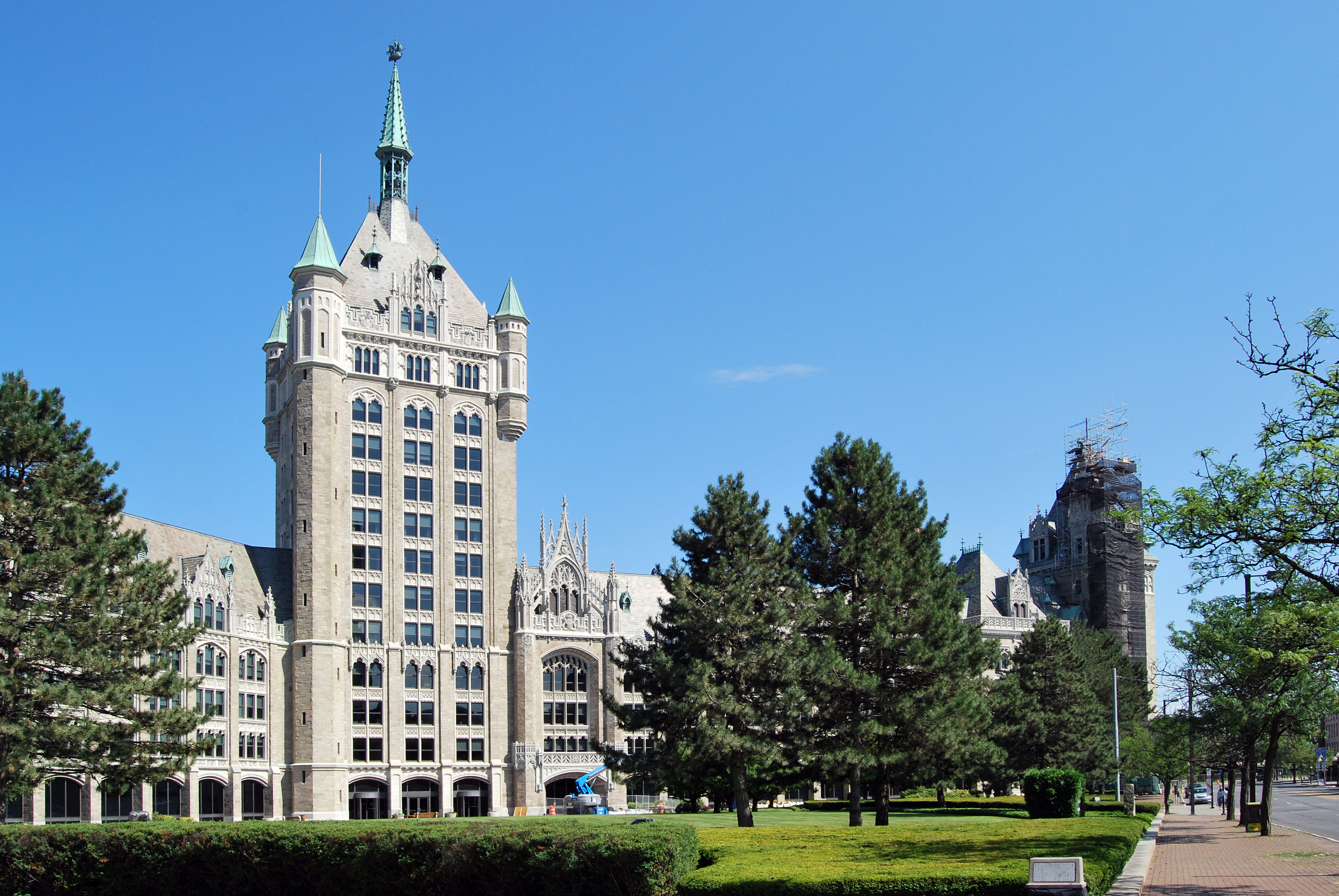

- Location within New York
- Location: Broadway between Division and State Streets; Albany, New York
- Coordinates: 42°38′53″N 73°45′0″W
- Built: 1914-1918
- Architect: Marcus T. Reynolds
- Part of: Downtown Albany Historic District (ID80002579)
- NRHP reference No.: 72000813
- Added to NRHP: March 16, 1972

SUNY Plaza, or the H. Carl McCall SUNY Building, formerly the Delaware & Hudson Railroad Company Building, is a public office building located at 353 Broadway at the intersection with State Street in downtown Albany, New York, United States. Locally the building is sometimes referred to as "The Castle" or "D&H Plaza"; prior to the construction of the nearby Empire State Plaza it was simply "The Plaza". The central tower of the building is thirteen stories high and is capped by an 8-foot-tall (2.4 m) working weathervane that is a replica of Henry Hudson's Half Moon.

The State University of New York system is centrally administered from the building. The southern tower's four top floors were once the official residence of the Chancellor of SUNY.

The building was listed on the National Register of Historic Places in 1972 under the name Delaware and Hudson Railroad Company Building. In 1980, when the Downtown Albany Historic District was listed on the Register, it was included as a contributing property.

== History ==
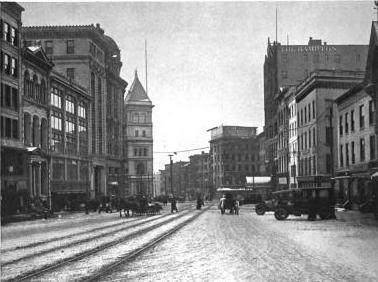
State Street looking east as it did prior to the Plaza

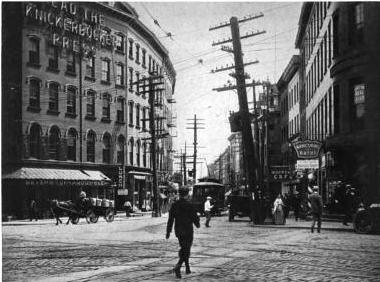
Broadway looking south, the Plaza would soon be on the left

The building and the land it sits on, which is located at the foot of State Street along Broadway, have a varied history. The oldest part of the city, it was here that several of Albany's earliest city halls sat, along with the New York State Legislature in the 18th century. The Albany Plan of Union in 1754, presided over by Ben Franklin, was held here. The land was once along the Hudson River's banks, over time being infilled, including in 1911 as part of the construction of the Plaza. The city of Albany purchased and consolidated the land ownership that allowed the D&H to build the building and the city to have a park in front surrounded by a street that acted as a loop for the trolleys running on State Street. Public access was allowed to the Hudson River through the central tower and by way of a tunnel to the other side of the D&H tracks. The design by Marcus T. Reynolds was based on the Nieuwerk annex of the Cloth Hall in Ypres, Belgium.

Reynolds originally envisioned for the site a triangular park at the termination of State Street with a large L-shaped pier that would go north for three city blocks that would also support another park with a bandshell and docks for yachts and boats. That design would have cost $1 million and was opposed by neighborhood groups as too expensive and grand a design' concerns were also expressed about the problems of railroad traffic. The idea of opening up the view of the waterfront to the public was considered unfeasible and undesirable at the time, as the river was full of commercial docks, wharves, warehouses, and railroads. A plan initiated by the Albany Chamber of Commerce – later published under the title Studies for Albany – decided upon a public park as a plaza surrounded by buildings that would screen the locomotive smoke, obnoxious odors and sights of the working waterfront from the vista of State Street.

The building was the corporate headquarters for the D&H Railroad. It was constructed in sections between 1914 and 1918. The central section, including the five-story block at the north end and the thirteen-story tower, connected by the long five-story diagonal wing, was built and occupied in 1914-15. Another five-story wing south of the central tower was constructed in 1915-1918; in 1916-1918 another separate but architecturally compatible and physically connected building was constructed to be the headquarters of the Albany Evening Journal newspaper. Another section, a warehouse at the north end, was later demolished.

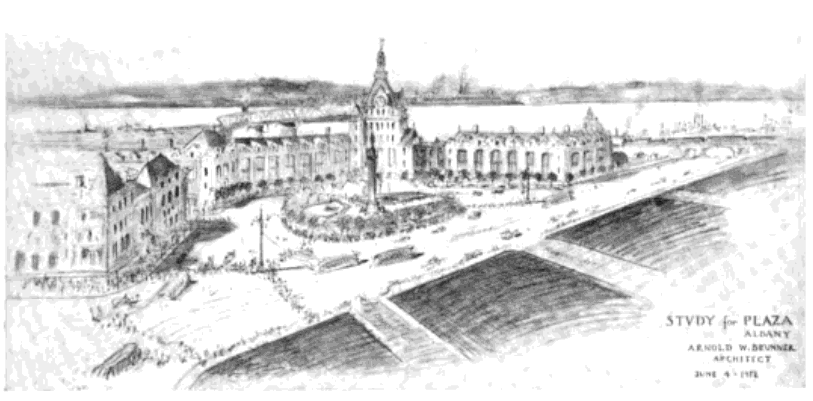
An early rendering for the Plaza

D&H Building and Federal Building/Post Office at the Plaza, 1915

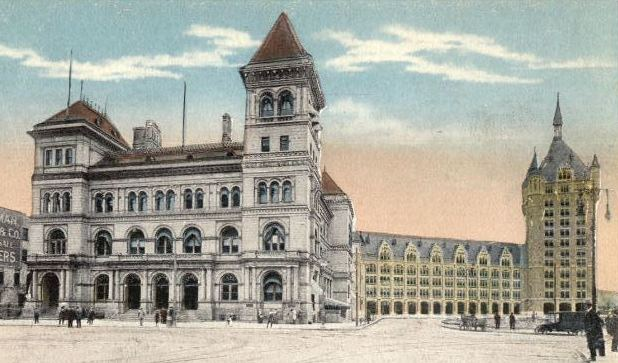
View east from the southside of State Street

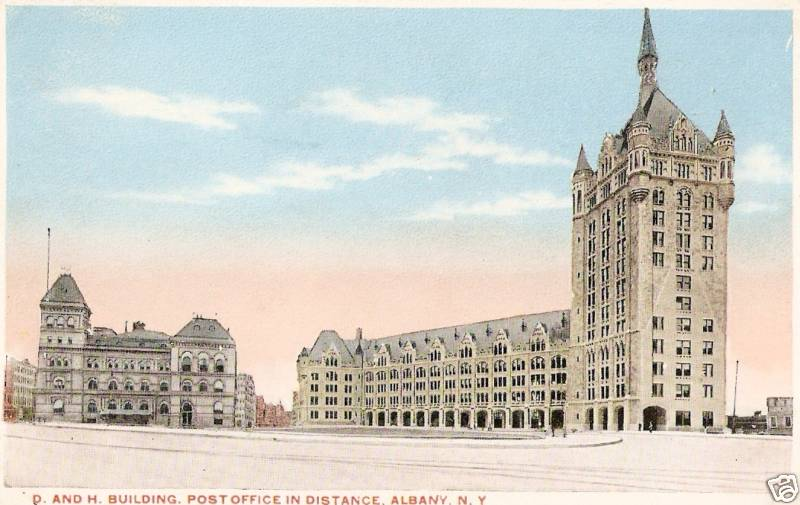
View north from Broadway and Hudson Avenue

William Barnes, editor of the Evening Journal, and the Republican boss of Albany had a lavish apartment on the upper floors of his newspaper's building at the south end of the complex. In 1924 the paper was sold to the Albany Times Union and the building became home to various other businesses including the predecessor to the New York State Department of Transportation.

After the D&H and Evening Journal both abandoned the building it sat dormant until November 1972, when the State University of New York (SUNY) announced it would purchase the building as its first permanent home, having occupied One Commerce Plaza as a temporary headquarters since March of that year. SUNY purchased the building in 1973 and interior renovation and construction began that year; they relocated there in 1978. That same year SUNY Chancellor Clifton R. Wharton Jr. decided that the southern tower would house the chancellor's apartment. The total renovation of the Plaza cost $15 million. In 1977 the neighboring Federal Building was purchased and connected to the main building, becoming part of SUNY Plaza. William Hall Associates won the top Owens Corning Energy Conservation Award in the government category for their work in the renovation.

The building's facade was restored from 1996 to 2001; it was covered in scaffolding during the five years of the restoration.

On February 14, 2020, the building was renamed the H. Carl McCall SUNY Building in honor of Carl McCall, a former chairman of the State University of New York Board of Trustees.

== Architecture ==
From north to south the building consisted of at least six sections. When first built the building had an undecorated warehouse directly behind the old Federal Building built of reinforced concrete. South of where the warehouse stood begins the current structure, beginning with a square tower with four corner turrets. A 5-story tall "arm" diagonally connects the north tower with the 13-story tall central tower. Those sections were built first, in 1914-5. The building was too small for all the D&H employees and so another "arm" was built south of the tower terminating at another square tower with corner turrets to house the offices of the Albany Evening Journal. When finally finished in 1918 the building was 660 feet (200 m) long. Today, without the warehouse, the Plaza is 630 feet (190 m) long and 48 feet (15 m) wide. The Plaza has approximately 200,000 square feet (19,000 m^{2}) of office space, with the former Federal Building providing an additional 90,000 square feet (8,400 m^{2}).

Though the building is in the Gothic Revival and / or Collegiate Gothic styles of architecture in stone and masonry, the original railroad company headquarters building sports several touches that tie the building into the Dutch colonial heritage of [|Albany]] and the early colony of New Netherlands along the Hudson River Valley in the 17th century. The central tower sports an 8-foot-tall (2.4 m) weathervane that is in the shape of explorer Henry Hudson's ship, the Half Moon while the gables of the entire building bear the shields and coat-of-arms of prominent colonial Dutch families including that of Albany's first mayor, Pieter Schuyler. Other non-gothic elements include the names and dates of prominent printers on the portion / wing of the building used by the former major daily newspaper, the Albany Evening Journal, including William Caxton (1487), the father of English printing.

The building serves as the scenic / picturesque terminating vista at the end of State Street in the Downtown Albany Historic District.

== Gallery ==
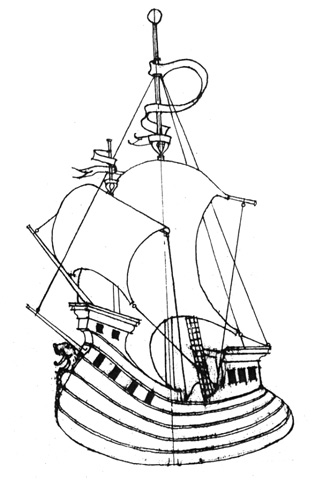
Marcus T. Reynolds' sketch of the weathervane on the central tower

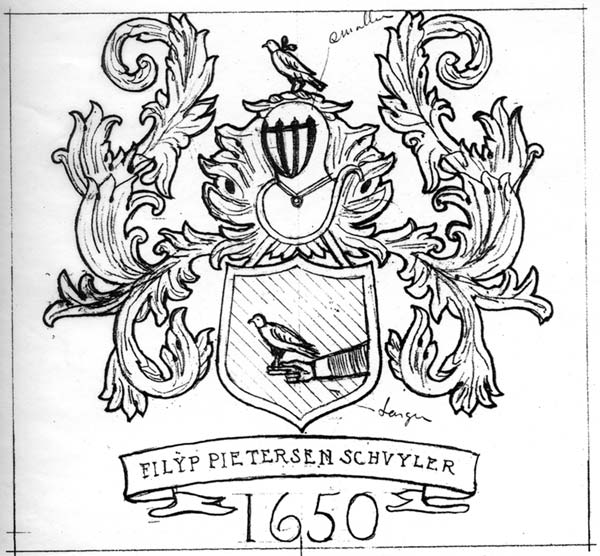
Mayor Pieter Schuyler's coat of arms

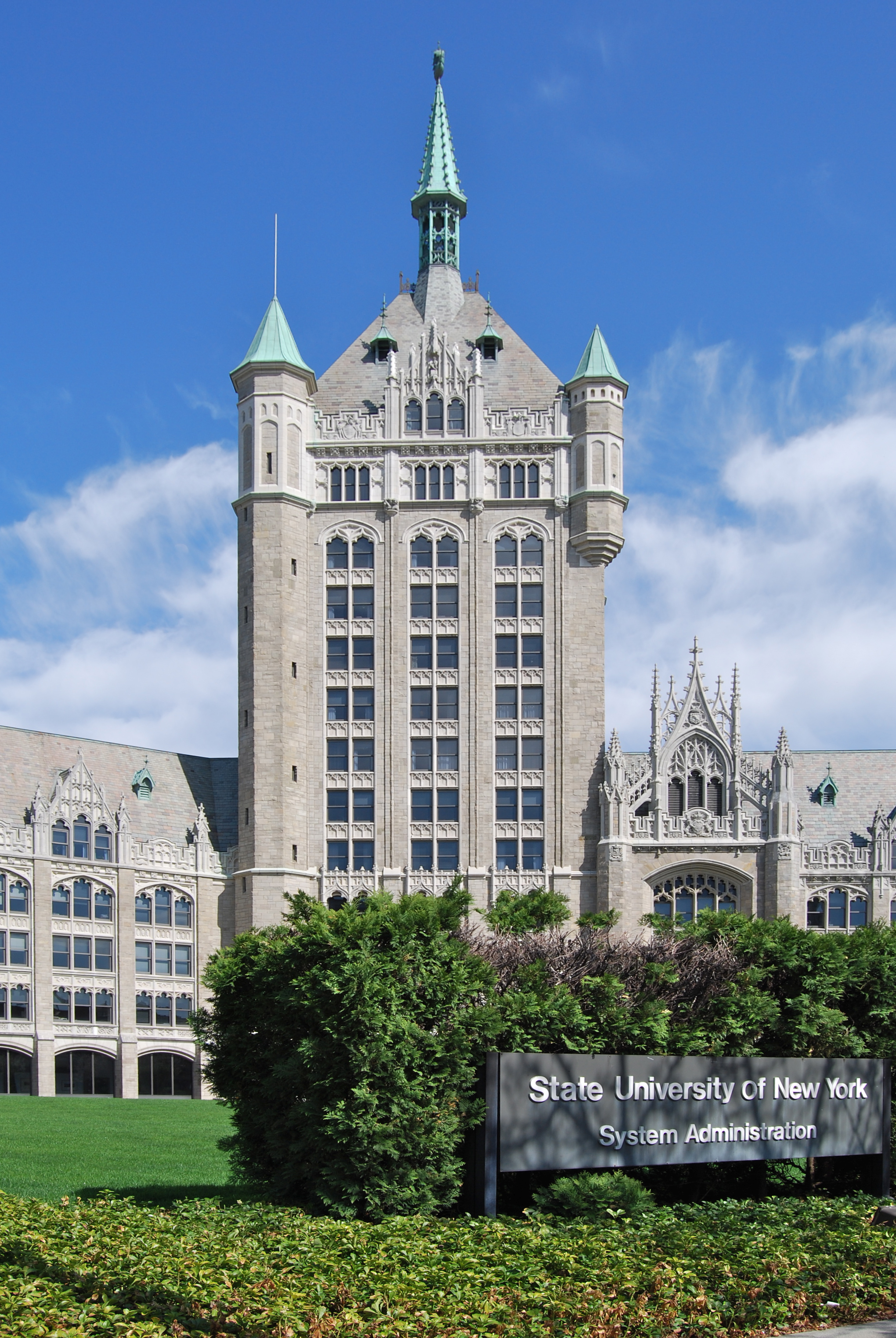
The building's central tower

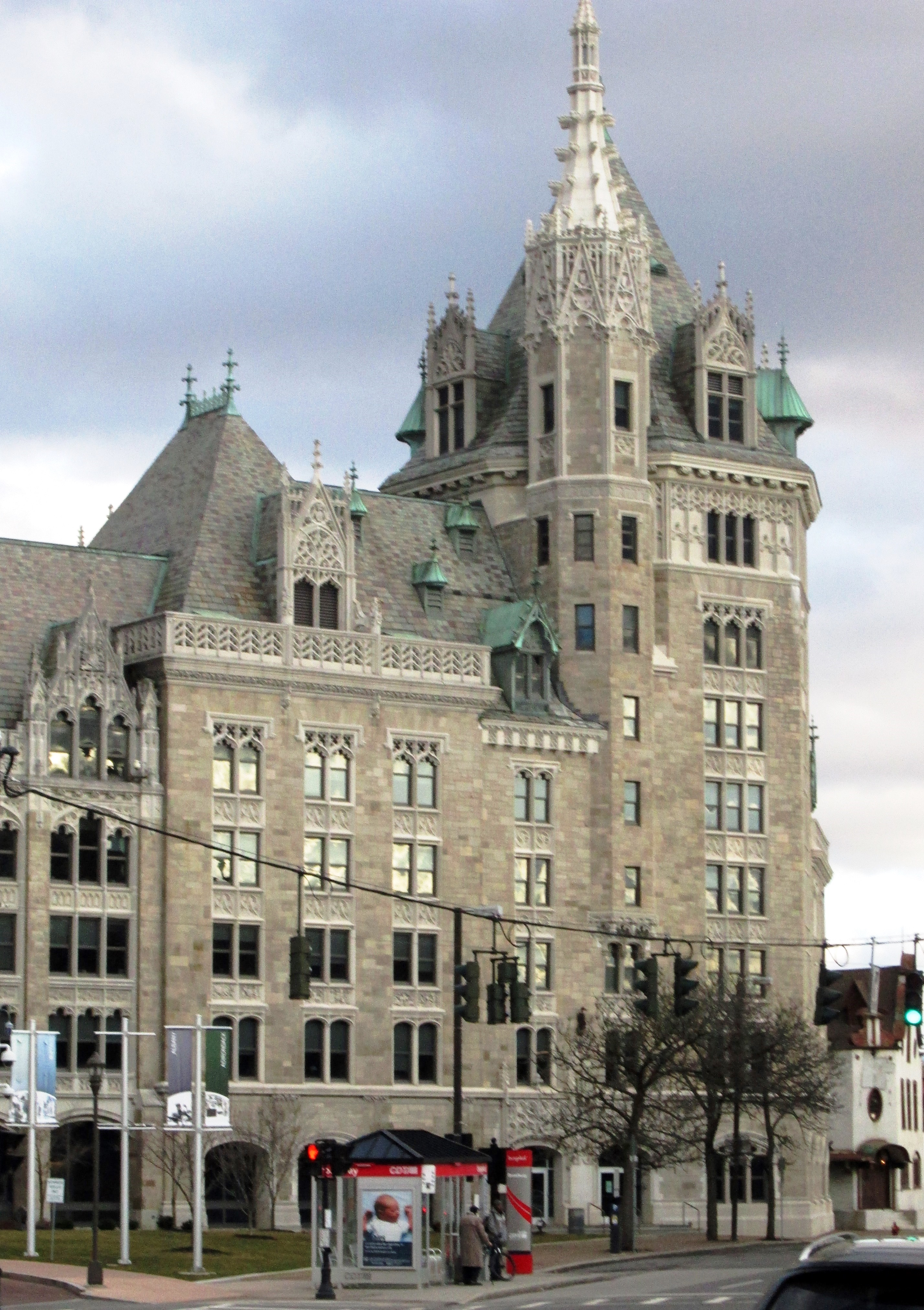
The Albany Evening Journal Building at the south end of the complex

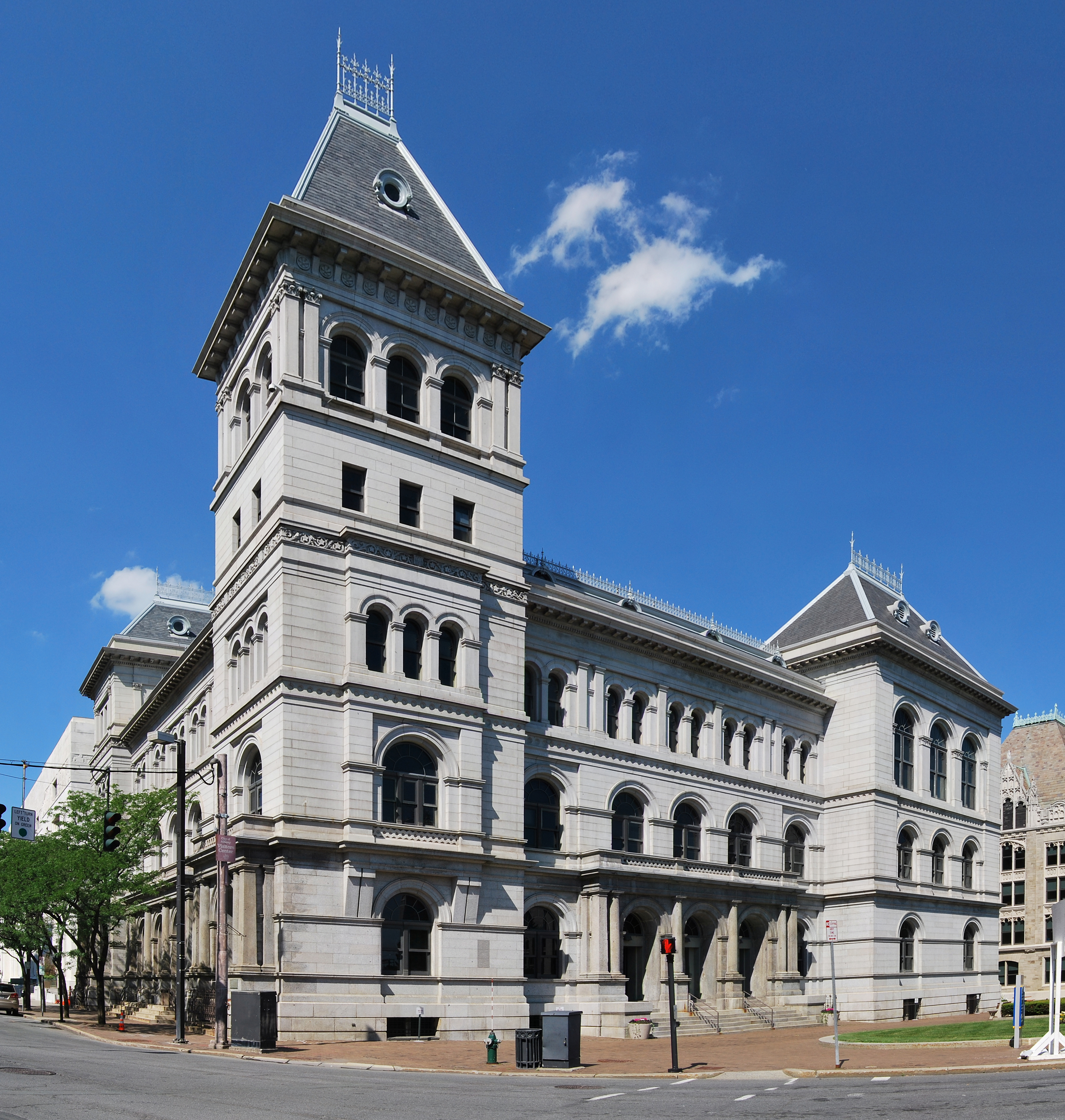
The Old Post Office adjacent to the main building, was purchased by SUNY in 1977 and connected to it to become part of SUNY Plaza

== See also ==
- History of Albany, New York
- National Register of Historic Places listings in Albany, New York
