= Albany City Savings Bank Building =

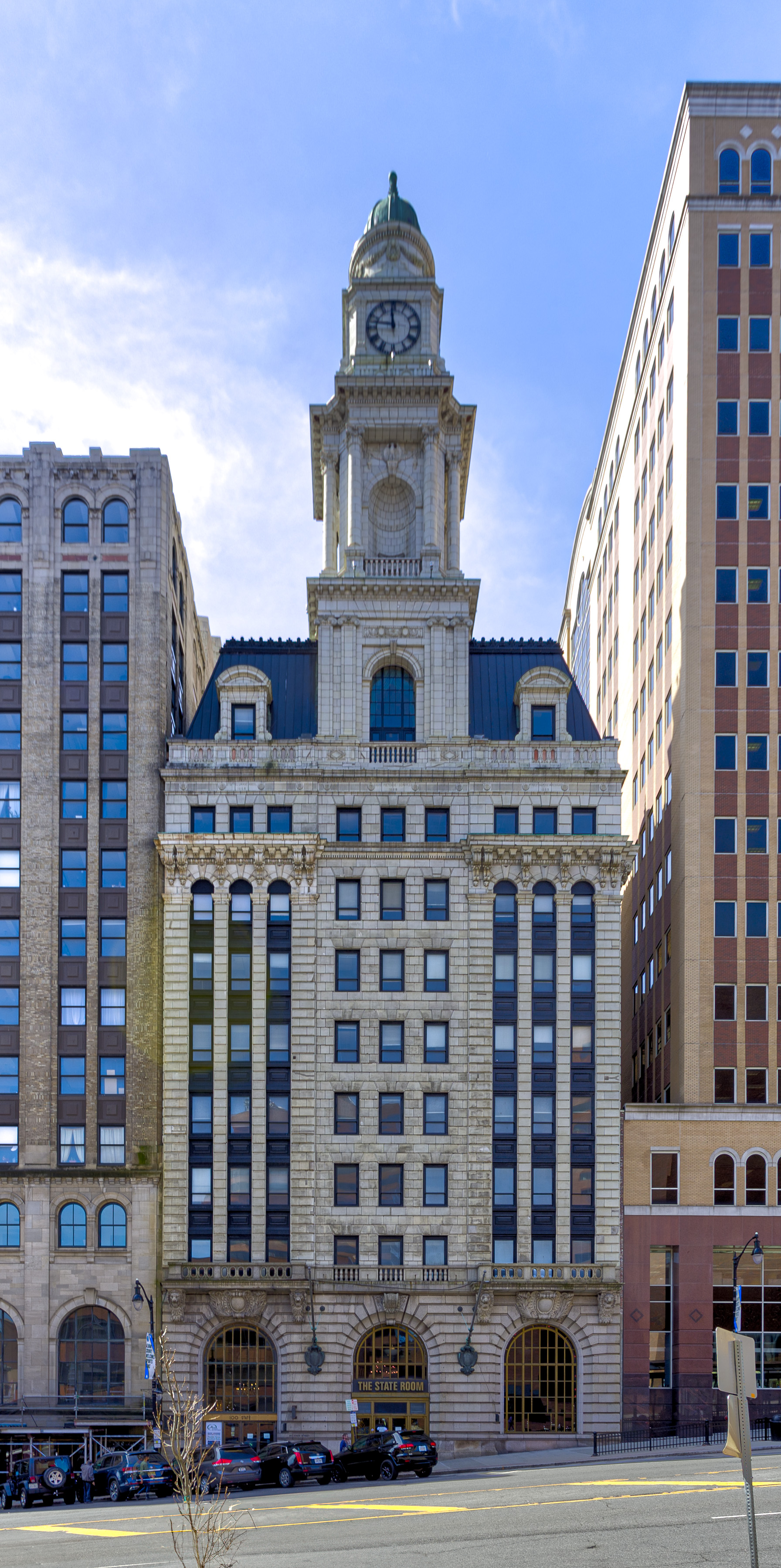
- 100 State Street, Albany, New York
- Interactive map of the Albany City Savings Bank Building area
- Former names: City and County Savings Bank Building
- Alternative names: Home and City Savings Bank Building

General information
- Status: Completed
- Architectural style: Beaux-Arts Architecture
- Location: 100 State Street, Albany, New York, United States
- Coordinates: 42°38′59″N 73°45′13″W
- Current tenants: The State Room, The Vault Café, FedEx
- Construction started: 1901
- Completed: 1902
- Renovated: 1922-1924
- Owner: Heights Real Estate

Height
- Height: 265 feet (80.8 m)

Technical details
- Structural system: Rigid Frame
- Floor count: 11
- Floor area: 92,132

Design and construction
- Architect: Marcus T. Reynolds

Website
- www.heightsre.com

The Albany City Savings Bank Building, also known as the Home and City Savings Bank, is located at 100 State Street and was the first skyscraper built in Albany, New York. It is the city's 11th tallest building today. It is a ten-story brick, granite, and terra-cotta structure located within the City of Albany's Central Business District. Designed by architect Marcus T. Reynolds, 100 State Street is a mixed-use retail and office building.

== History ==
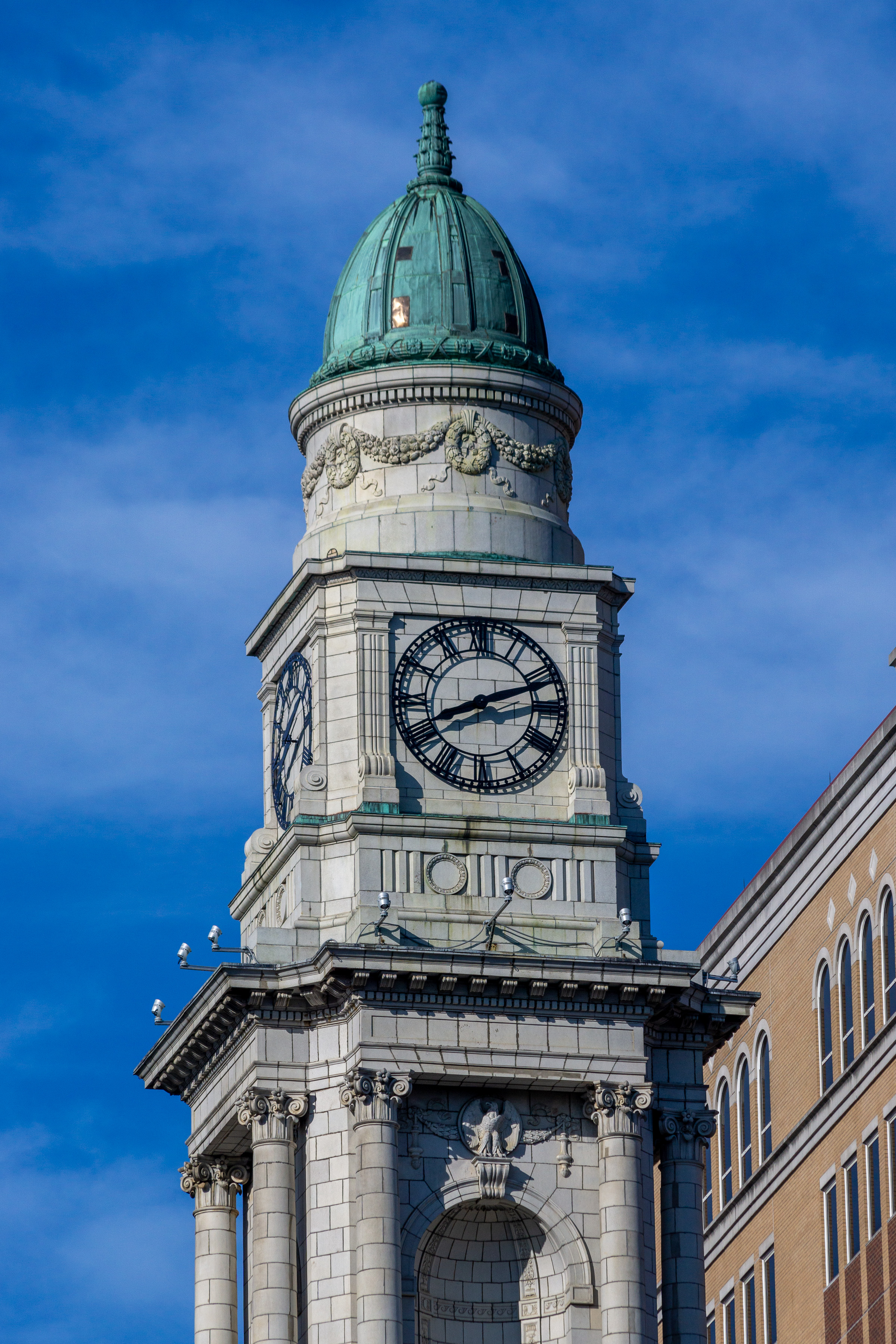
Clock tower

The original building located at 100 State Street was designed in 1901 by architect Marcus T. Reynolds, who has been noted as the best architect to come out of Albany. The building was initially intended for the City and County Savings Bank, who opened their doors at this site in May 1902. 100 State Street was Albany's very first skyscraper and meant to be easily seen from the Hudson River. Reynolds himself occupied offices in the building, where he stayed for the rest of his professional career.

In 1922, Albany's mayor commissioned Reynolds to design a large addition that would more than double the size of the building. The end result featured an additional six bays to the west, topped with a mansard roof, an ornate clock tower, and a terra cotta cupola.

Throughout its history, the building has been the subject for artwork, such as in John Floyd Yewell's watercolor piece, painted in 1922 and now displayed by the Albany Institute of History and Art, and in the postcards published in 1928 and preserved today by the Albany Postcard Project.

== Features and composition ==
The main bank room has vaulted ceilings, marble walls and flooring, and gold-embossed Corinthian columns. The building's separate main lobby is also decorated with marble walls and stairways, and provides access to three passenger elevators. There is also a 2,500-pound freight elevator.

Each floor averages approximately 8,000 square feet (740 m^{2}), with the building totaling 93,132 square feet (8,652.2 m^{2}) altogether.

== Renovation ==
The Heights Real Estate Company purchased the building in 2008 for $3.5 million. The new owners put millions of dollars and over a decade into gradually renovating the entire building. The building was covered with scaffolding for years while contractors repainted the exterior, replaced the roof, replaced masonry and redid the parapets. The clock was fully disassembled and shipped to a repair company in St. Louis for restoration. The newly restored clock includes LED lighting which is capable of illuminating the clock in multiple colors. The scaffolding came down in November 2020.

The interiors of the hallways, office suites, and rest rooms have been renovated, the building's façade has been restored, and the cooling tower for the air conditioning system has been replaced.

== See also ==
- Tallest Buildings in Albany, New York
