= Home Savings Bank Building =

Historic commercial building in New York, United States

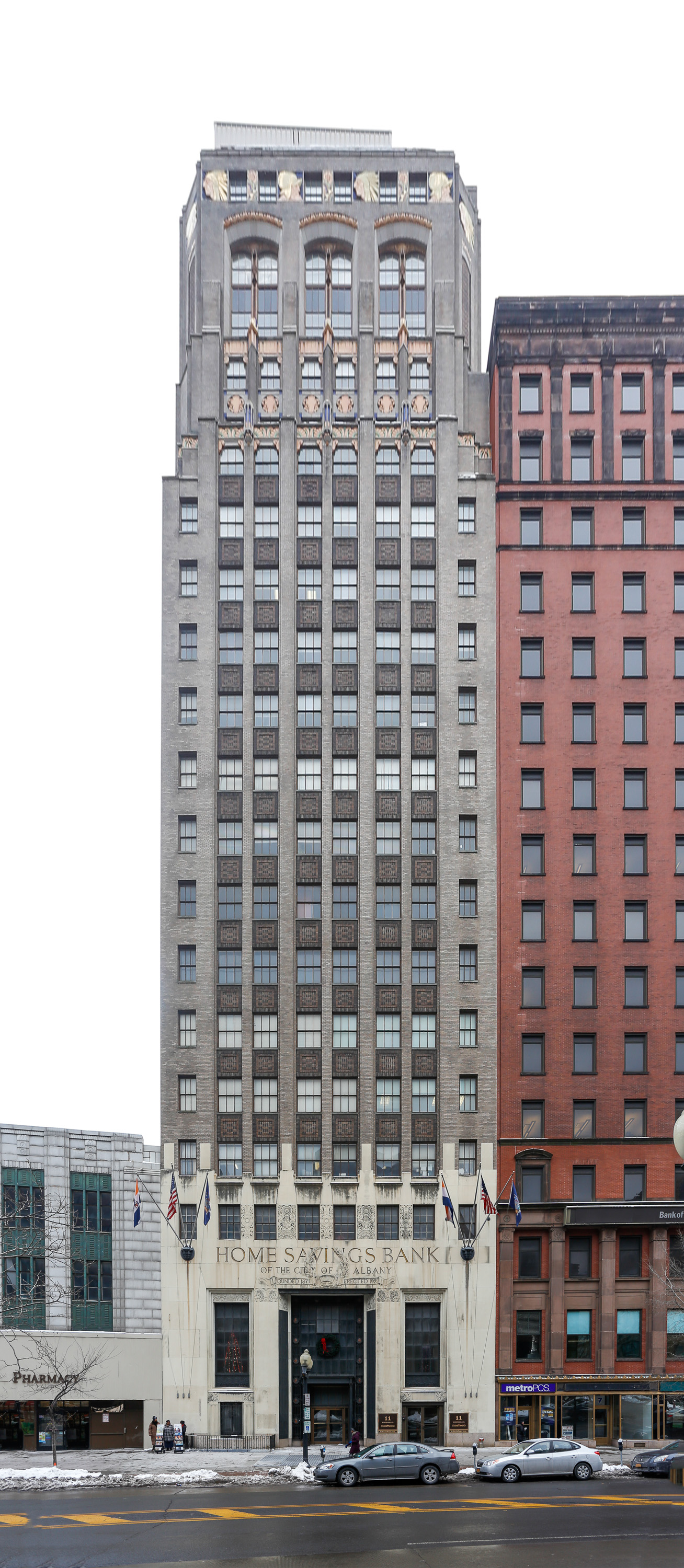
- Interactive map of the Home Savings Bank Building area

General information
- Status: Completed
- Architectural style: Art Deco
- Location: 11 North Pearl Street, Albany, New York, United States
- Coordinates: 42°39′00″N 73°45′08″W
- Completed: 1927

Height
- Height: 267.47 feet (81.5 m)

Technical details
- Floor count: 21

Design and construction
- Architect: Dennison & Hirons

Website
- 11northpearl.com

The Home Savings Bank Building is an office building located in downtown Albany, New York, United States at 11 North Pearl Street (NY 32). At 19 stories and 267 feet (81 m) tall, it is the eleventh-tallest building in the city.

== Description ==
When it was completed in 1927, the Home Savings Bank Building was the tallest structure in Albany. However, the Alfred E. Smith Building surpassed it the following year. That building has since been surpassed by the Erastus Corning Tower, which since its construction in 1973 has held the title of Albany's tallest building. Nevertheless, the Home Savings Bank Building has remained the tallest private building in Albany since its construction.

The building features unusual stylized Art Deco images of Native Americans and colonial settlers near its roof and ground-floor street entrance. The artwork of unique decorative metal and terra cotta is by Rene Paul Chambellan. Also of architectural note is the original street-level banking floor with its various historic seals, rich marble walls and incredibly high ceilings. In recent years, the building has been extensively renovated as a combination downtown central business district office building and high tech telecommunications facility. As of 2010, the bank lobby is being leased to a formal event catering company, who uses the facility for banquets and wedding receptions.

In 1980, when the Downtown Albany Historic District was listed on the National Register of Historic Places, the building was included as a contributing property.

As of 2010, the Home Savings bank building was owned by New York City-based Heights Real Estate Company.

== Gallery ==
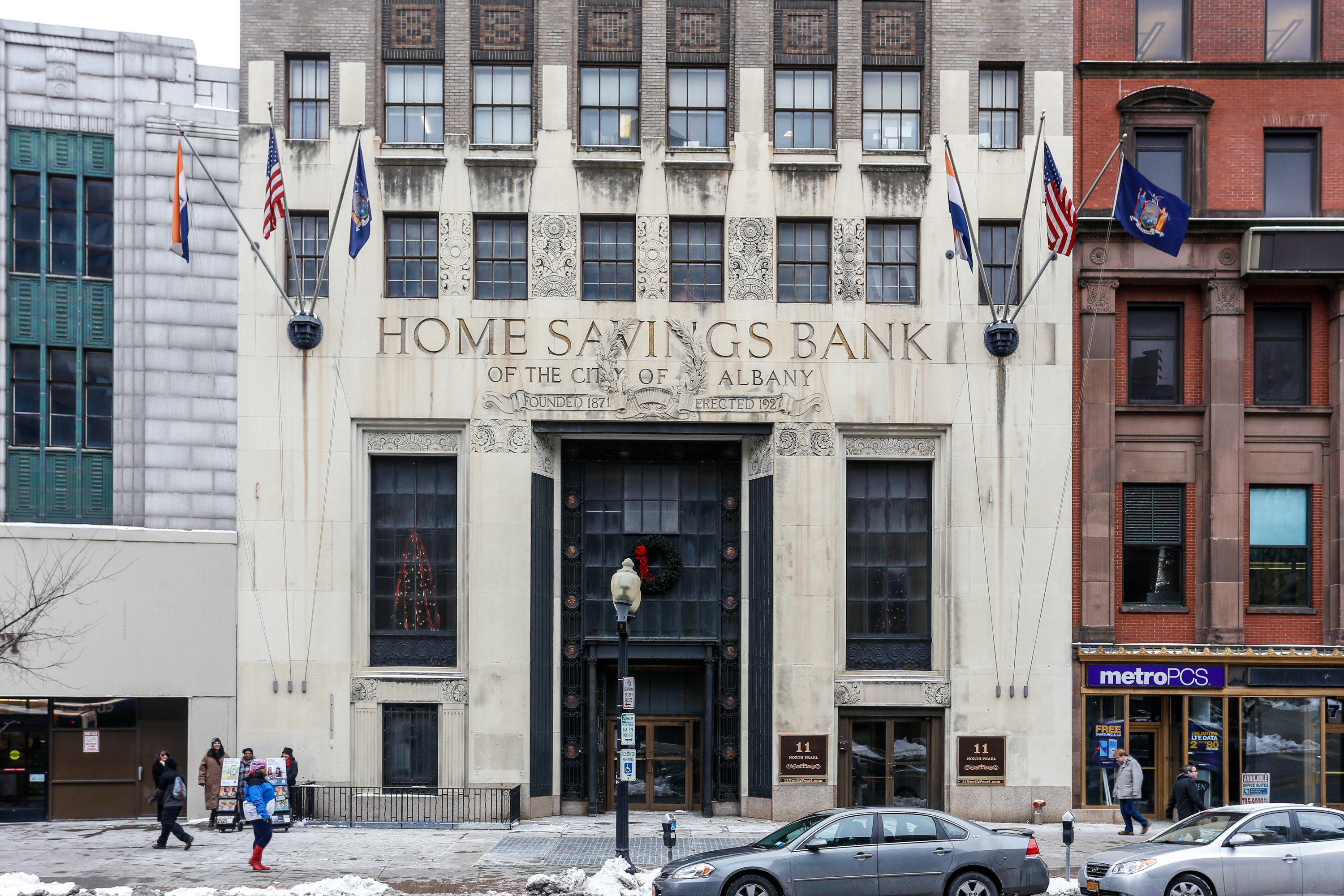
Detail of the entrance

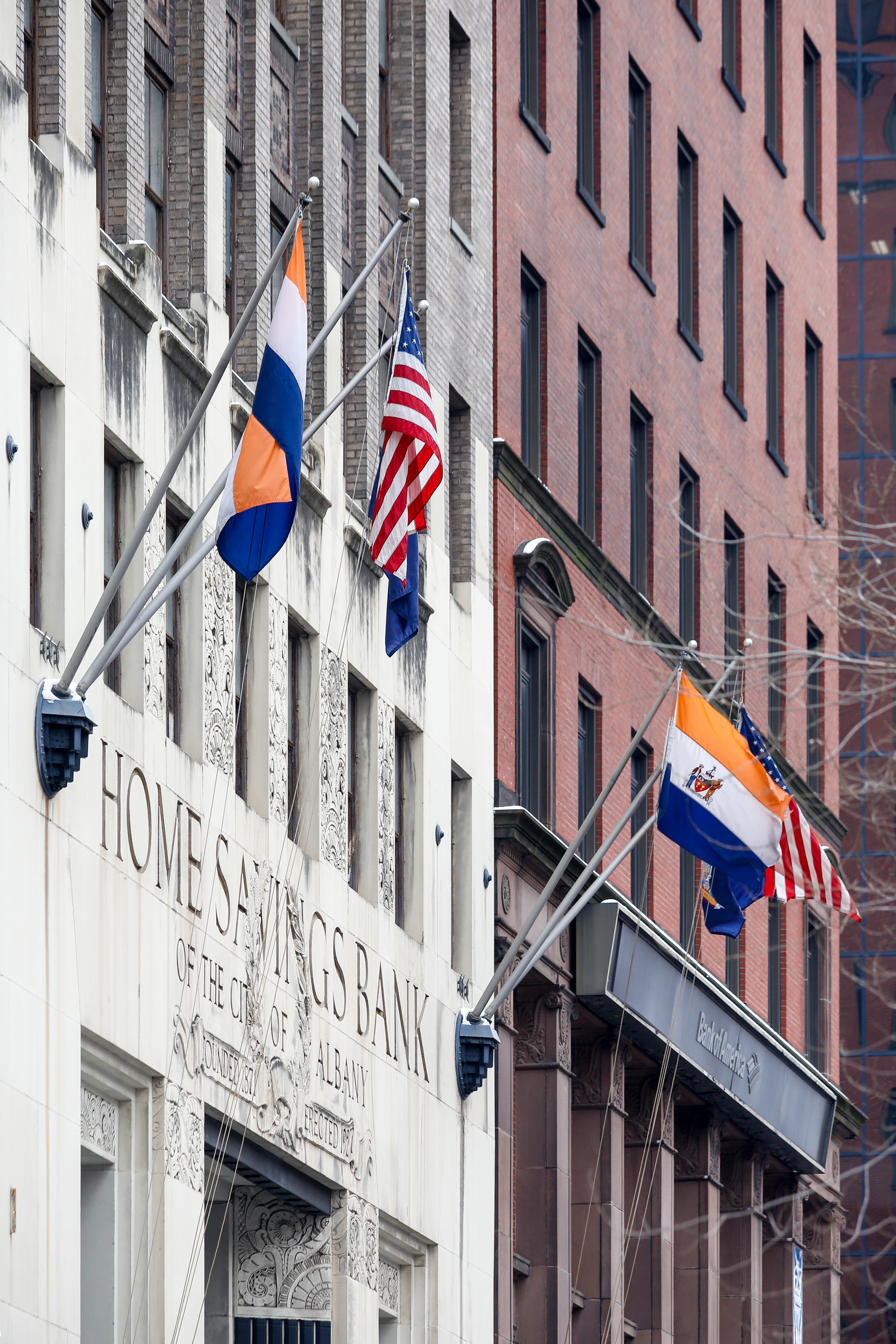
The building flies the flags of the United States, New York State, and the City of Albany.

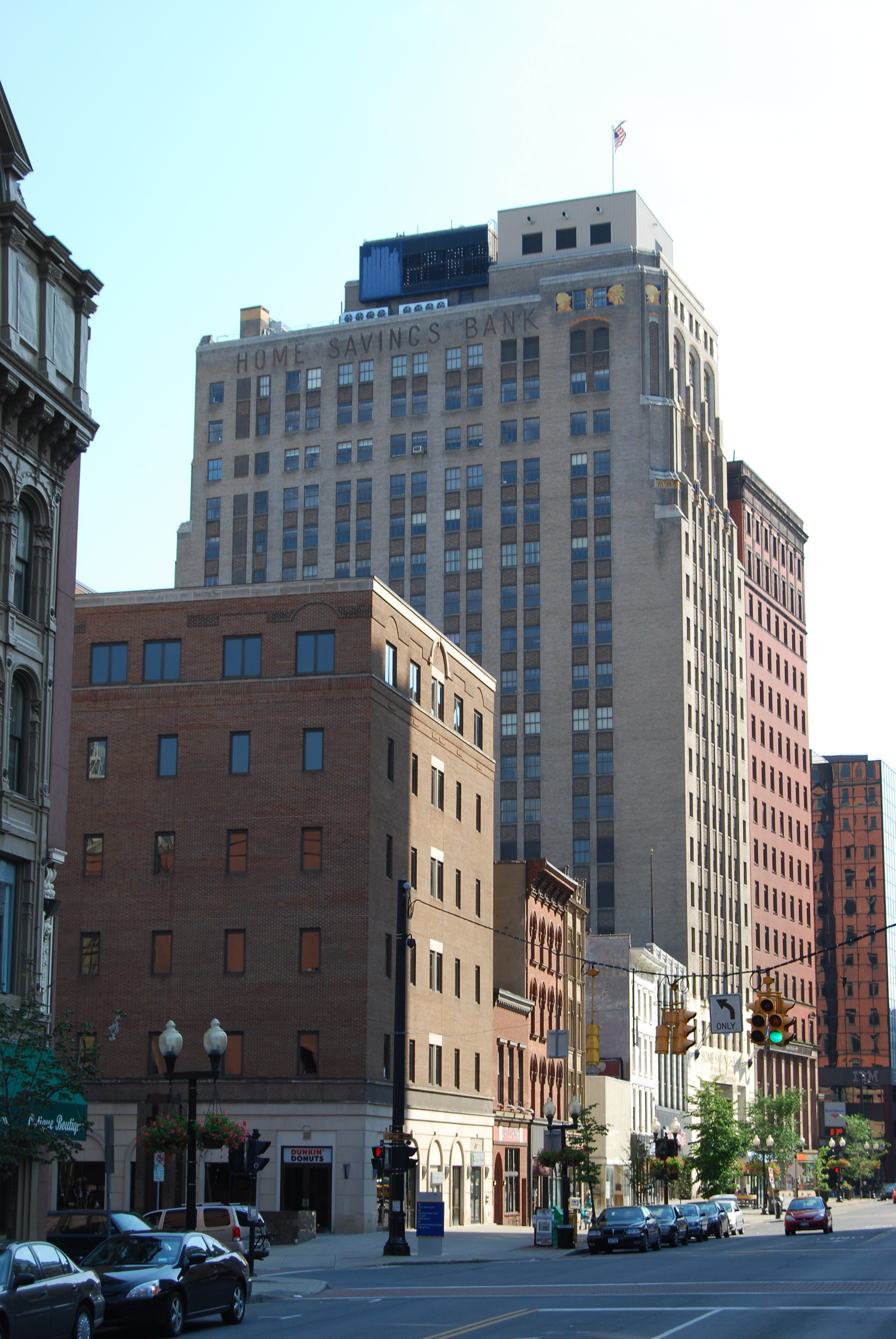
View from the North

== See also ==
- List of tallest buildings in Albany, New York
