= Albany Trust Company Building =

Historic commercial building in New York, United States

- First Trust Company Building (Albany Trust Company Building)
- U.S. National Register of Historic Places
- U.S. Historic district – Contributing property
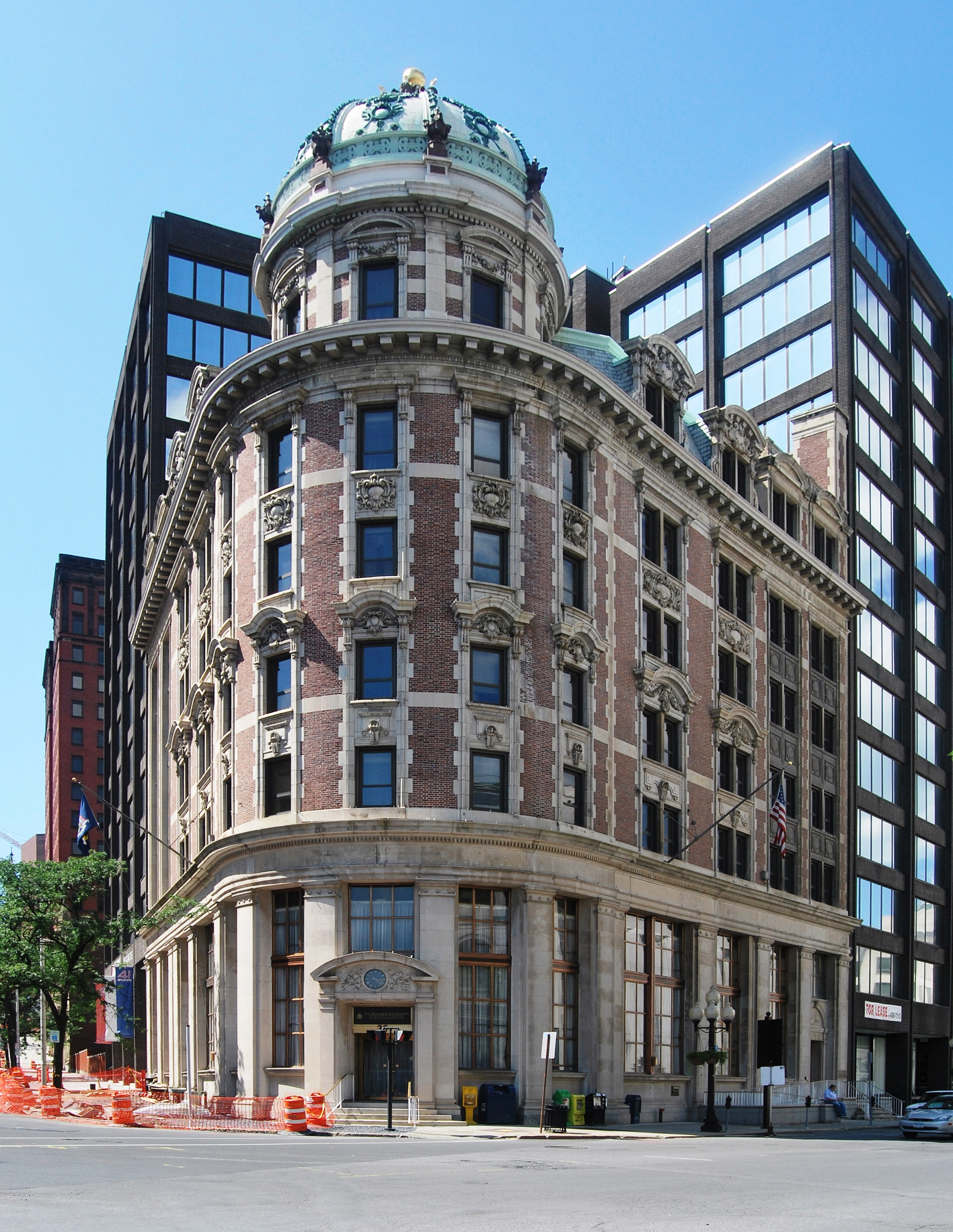
- South and east elevations, 2011

- Location within New York
- Location: 35 State Street, Albany, New York
- Coordinates: 42°38′57″N 73°45′5″W
- Built: 1904
- Architect: Marcus T. Reynolds
- Architectural style: Renaissance Revival
- Part of: Downtown Albany Historic District
- NRHP reference No.: 73001156
- Added to NRHP: January 18, 1973

The Albany Trust Company Building is a historic commercial building located at 35 State Street at the corner of Broadway in Albany, New York. It was built in 1904 and was designed by Marcus T. Reynolds in the Renaissance Revival style. Currently, it is the main offices of the Research Foundation for the State University of New York.

The building was listed on the National Register of Historic Places in 1973 as the First Trust Company Building. It is also a contributing property to the Downtown Albany Historic District.

== History and description ==
The property at State Street and Broadway had been the site of a rounded building since the 1830s. In 1902, the Albany Trust Company asked prominent Albany architect Marcus T. Reynolds to design a new headquarters for the bank, and Reynolds decided that the new building would also be rounded. He made the curve the focus of the building by putting the main entrance at the corner, and by topping the building with a dome shape. Extensions to the building were later added along both State Street and Broadway.

The interior features a circular banking floor.

== See also ==
- National Register of Historic Places listings in Albany, New York
- Albany Trust, a British charity
- The Albany, a significant building in London
