= Marcus T. Reynolds =

American architect

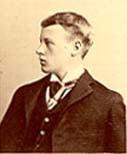
- Born: August 20, 1869; Great Barrington, Massachusetts, U.S.
- Died: March 18, 1937 (aged 67); Albany, New York, U.S.
- Education: The Albany Academy; Williams College; Columbia University
- Occupation: Architect
- Buildings: Delaware and Hudson Railroad Company Building

Marcus Tullius Reynolds (August 20, 1869 – March 18, 1937) was an American architect from the Albany, New York area. Born in Great Barrington, Massachusetts, he was raised by his aunt in Albany after the death of his mother. He attended Williams College and Columbia University and began his life as an architect in 1893. He is well known for his bank designs and specifically his design of the Delaware and Hudson Railroad Company Building in downtown Albany. Many of his buildings still stand today; some are listed on the National Register of Historic Places. He was the brother of the Albany historian and author Cuyler Reynolds.

== Early years ==
Reynolds was born on August 20, 1869 to Dexter and Catherine Reynolds (née Cuyler) in Great Barrington, Massachusetts. When Catherine Reynolds died in 1875, Dexter placed Marcus and his brother Cuyler under the care of Dexter's sister Laura, widow of Bayard Van Rensselaer, moving them to 98 Columbia Street in Albany, New York. The Reynolds' family connection to the Van Rensselaer family allowed the boys to grow up surrounded by "wealthy, socially, and politically connected Dutch and New England heritage".

As a boy, Reynolds attended Miss Gaylord's Boarding School in Catskill, New York. He later attended The Albany Academy in Albany and graduated from St. Paul's School in Concord, New Hampshire in 1886. He entered Williams College in Williamstown, Massachusetts in the fall, where he became involved in the Sigma Phi fraternity. Reynolds was an avid photographer while in college, documenting architectural details on campus as well as collecting portraits of many of his classmates. Reynolds decided to pursue architecture and enrolled in the architectural program at Columbia University's School of Mines after graduating from Williams in 1890. Reynolds graduated from Columbia in 1893. His thesis, Housing of the Poor in American Cities, won him a prize from the American Economic Society and earned him an honorary Master of Arts degree from Williams College. It is still cited in scholarly work to this day.

== Professional years ==
Rather than remain in New York City like many of classmates, Reynolds returned to Albany to begin his professional life. Indeed, Reynolds' social status and connections helped him significantly when looking for work; many of his high-class family friends became clients. Reynolds' first commissions out of college the demolition of the decrepit Van Rensselaer Mansion, which was owned by his cousins. He had much of the original building moved to Williams College where it was incorporated into the replacement Sigma Phi house. The structure was in such bad shape, much of the material was not usable in the new building. His efforts on this project supported his second published work, The Colonial Buildings of Rensselaerwyck.

The most notable of Reynolds' works is the Delaware and Hudson Railroad Company Building (D&H Building)—now known as the SUNY System Administration Building—located on Broadway at the bottom of State Street. Bank designs are considered his specialty. Many of his designs took advantage of sites in the city. For example, the D&H Building on its own plaza on Broadway at the base of State Street; the First Trust Company Building diagonally across from D&H plaza; the replacement Albany Academy building on Academy Road; and the Hackett Middle School on Delaware Avenue. Reynolds' practice was not just limited to Albany. He designed the Gideon Putnam hotel in Saratoga Springs, and designed banks in Catskill, Hudson, Amsterdam, and New York City. Many of his buildings are listings on the National Register of Historic Places.

Reynolds died on March 18, 1937 of appendicitis. He is credited by at least one historian for no less than "chang[ing] the face of downtown Albany."

== Albany County Portfolio ==
Year built	Building name	Image	Address	Neighborhood	Existing	NRHP	Comments
1893	Albany Terminal Storage Warehouse Co.		Tivoli Street		Yes	No	
1893-1895	Van Rensselaer Manor House			Albany, New York (original location)	No	No	Rebuilt at Williams College, Williamstown, Massachusetts; demolished 1973
1896–1897	Van Rensselaer Houses		385–389 State Street	Downtown Albany	Yes	No	
1898	Albany Country Club		Western Avenue		No	No	Remodeled and enlarged
1899–1900	United Traction Company Building		598 Broadway; 42°39′7.71″N 73°44′58.55″W	North Albany/Downtown	Yes	Yes	
1899	Curtis Douglas House		4 Elk Street	Downtown Albany			Façade remodeled
1899	Garrit Yates Lansing House		294 State Street	Center Square	Yes	No	Alterations only
1899	New York State Normal School Dormitory				No	No	Proposal only; never built
1899	Superintendent's House		Menands; 42°42′22.44″N 73°43′25.83″W	Albany Rural Cemetery	Yes	No	Albany Rural Cemetery is listed on the National Register on its own; the house is not listed separately
1900–1901	Pruyn Free Library		North Pearl Street and Clinton Avenue; 42°39′15.35″N 73°45′0.18″W	Arbor Hill	No	No	
1901	Meads Building		545 Broadway		Yes	No	
1901–1902	Albany City Savings Institution		100 State Street	Downtown Albany	Yes	No	
1901–1902	Canon George Carter House		62 South Swan Street; 42°39′17.87″N 73°45′30.72″W		Yes	No	
1901–1904	Van Rensselaer Apartments		Madison Avenue and Lark Street; 42°39′8.9″N 73°46′3.72″W	Center Square	Yes	No	
1902	National Savings Bank		70–72 State Street	Downtown Albany	No	No	
1902–1904	Albany Trust Company		31–33 State Street	Downtown Albany	Yes	No	Also designed additions in 1908 and the 1930s
1902–1904	New York State National Bank		69 State Street	Downtown Albany	No	No	Design addition in 1916
1903–1905	Ryder Apartments		355 State Street	Center Square	Yes	No	
1904	First Trust Company Building		35 State St. 42°38′56.62″N 73°45′3.25″W	Downtown	Yes	Yes	
1904	Edmund Niles Huyck House		319 State Street	Center Square	Yes	No	Designed addition in 1915
1904–1906	The Hampton		40 State Street	Downtown Albany	Yes	No	
1907–1908	Homeopathic Hospital		123 North Pearl Street			No	Later Memorial Hospital
1908	William Wallace House		6 Elk Street	Downtown Albany	Yes	No	Façade remodeled
1909	William J. Barnes Bungalow		16 Waverly Place		No	No	Designed an addition in 1916; building destroyed by fire. Also known as the SUNY ALbany Chapel at one point.
1910	Hampton Plaza Café					No	Alterations
1910	Hook and Ladder No. 4		Delaware Avenue; 42°38′29.76″N 73°46′46.67″W	Delaware Avenue	Yes	Yes	
1912–1918	Delaware and Hudson Railroad Company Building		Broadway at State Street; 42°38′53.11″N 73°44′58.25″W	Downtown	Yes	Yes	
1913–1915	Albany Industrial Building		1031 Broadway; 42°39′54.25″N 73°44′30.87″W	North Albany	Yes	No	
1915	Harmon Pumpelly Read House		7 Elk Street; 42°39′11.65″N 73°45′15.56″W	Downtown	Yes	No	Façade remodeled
1915–1916	Municipal Gas Company Building		126 State Street; 42°39′1.48″N 73°45′16.75″W	Downtown	Yes	No	
1922–1924	Public School No. 4		Madison Avenue and Ontario Street		No	No	
1924	Albany City Savings Institution		100 State Street; 42°38′59.42″N 73°45′12.25″W	Downtown	Yes	No	
1925–1927	William S. Hackett Junior High School		45 Delaware Avenue; 42°38′59.32″N 73°46′11.37″W	Delaware Avenue	Yes	No	
1928–1931	The Albany Academy		Academy Road; 42°38′45.62″N 73°47′13.32″W		Yes	No	
1930	The Albany Academy (Joseph Henry Memorial)		Academy Park; 42°39′10.91″N 73°45′17.77″W	Downtown	Yes	Yes	Oversaw the conversion of the original Albany Academy into district offices for the City School District of Albany.

== Greene County Portfolio ==
Year built	Building name	Image	Address	Neighborhood	Existing	NRHP	Comments
1909	Catskill Savings Bank		341 Main Street; 42°13′04.3″N 73°51′54.4″W	Catskill	Yes	Yes	

== Saratoga County Portfolio ==
Year built	Building name	Image	Address	City	Existing	NRHP	Comments
1912	Manufacturer's National Bank		7 North Main Street, Mechanicville, NY 12118 42.902844°N 73.687025°W	Mechanicville	Yes	No	Building is now used for a private school.

== Published works ==
- Reynolds, Marcus T. (Apr–Jun 1895). "Colonial Buildings of Rensselaerwyck". Architectural Record. IV (4).
