= Stephen and Harriet Myers Residence =

Historic house in New York, United States

- U.S. National Register of Historic Places
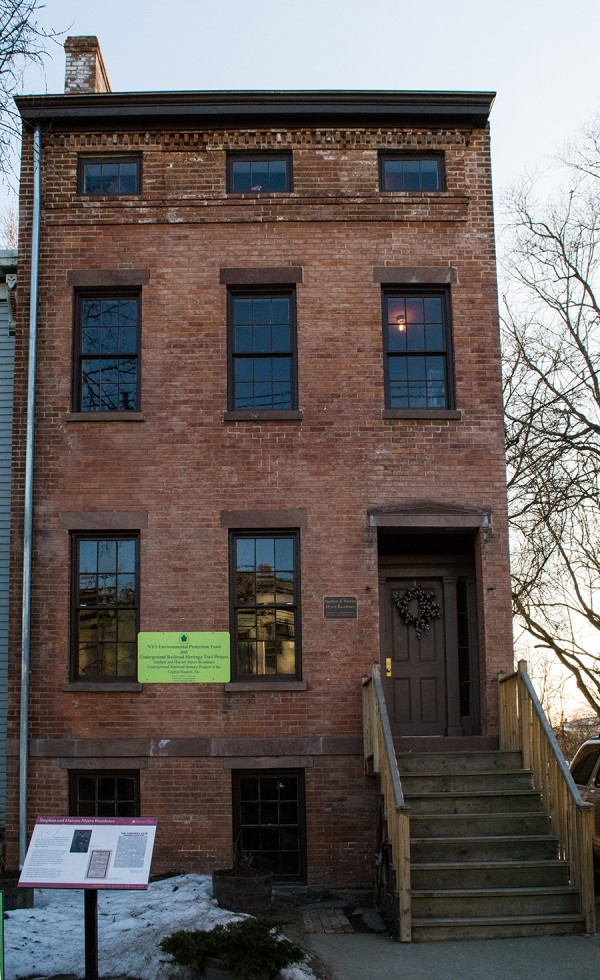
- North (front) elevation, 2015

- Location within New York Location within the United States
- Location: 194 Livingston Avenue; Albany, NY
- Coordinates: 42°39′39″N 73°45′15″W
- Area: less than one acre
- Built: 1847
- Architectural style: Greek Revival
- Website: website
- NRHP reference No.: 04000999
- Added to NRHP: November 30, 2004

The Stephen and Harriet Myers Residence is located on Livingston Avenue in Albany, New York, United States. It is a Greek Revival townhouse built in the mid-19th century. In 2004, it was listed on the National Register of Historic Places. It is also listed on the New York State Underground Railroad Heritage Trail and is a site on the National Park Service's National Network to Freedom.

Stephen Myers, himself freed from slavery in his youth, served for a time as chairman of the Vigilance Committee of Albany, which met in the house built and owned by his brother-in-law, an African American boat captain. Stephen and his wife Harriet actively assisted others escaping from slavery for nearly 30 years; he also edited some abolitionist newspapers and spoke with Frederick Douglass at anti-slavery events.

The house was later saved from demolition during urban renewal in the 1970s. It is being restored by the Underground Railroad Education Center, a community-based historical society, with public and private funds.

== Building ==
The house is located on the south side of Livingston, midway between North Swan and Lark streets, in Albany's Arbor Hill neighborhood north of its downtown areas. It is one of the few brick buildings on that side of the street, in the middle of a group of older timber frame commercial and residential buildings. There are some vacant lots between the newer frame houses on either end of the block built during urban renewal. All are on narrow lots with tall shade trees in the rear. The terrain slopes eastward toward the Hudson River; to the west it levels out.

North Swan, to the east, is the boundary of the Arbor Hill Historic District – Ten Broeck Triangle, also listed on the Register. On that block is Ten Broeck Mansion, a contributing property to that district and listed on the Register individually. Two parks, Wilkie Playground and Arbor Hill Park, are in the blocks to the north.

=== Exterior ===
The building itself is a 2 1/2-story, three-bay structure of brick laid in stretcher bond on an exposed basement. A set of wooden steps lead up to the main entrance, on the western bay. A more modern frame house is abuts on the east. There are no windows on either of the gabled sides.

Trim, from the water table to the lintels and sills, is of sandstone. All of the latter are plain and rectangular except for the triangular main entrance lintel. Both first floor windows have original six-over-six double-hung sash. Upstairs, only the western window does; the other two have one-over-one but will ultimately be restored to six-over-six. There are two other one-over-one windows in the basement, and rectangular casement eyebrow windows in the frieze below the attic cornice. As part of the restoration process all of the older features are expected to be restored.

=== Interior ===
The main entrance, at the top of the steps, is slightly recessed. There is a handmade oak door situated at the front entrance.

Below the steps is the basement entrance which opens into a long side hallway. In the front, it gives entrance to a large room that served as the dining room during the 19th century. Most of the interior finishings have deteriorated, but the original wainscoting and a wooden mantelpiece with shelf supported by pilasters. In the rear, the former kitchen has a heating furnace that was installed in 2015. The entire wall between it and the hall has been taken down and the building shored up since part of it had collapsed.

The stairs begin midway through the hall and convey to the first floor. Both the newel post and balustrade are not present. The stairs make 180-degree turns, with the stairwell windows slightly dropped from the other two windows on the corresponding story. On the walls of the staircase is a mural with a timeline containing over 100 events that document African American history beginning with the New York Conspiracy of 1741.

The first floor has a similar plan but with higher ceilings in the parlors. Both also have plaster cornices; medallions seem to be missing but remain in the stair hall. Chimney breasts in both rooms have been stripped of their original plaster. The window surrounds, paneling beneath the windows and flooring are all original.

The second floor has a similar layout to the first. A small room is at the front end of the hallway above the entrance. The bedrooms have their original wooden trim, but no mantelpieces. On either side of the chimney breast in the rear are small closets.

A secondary hall corresponding to the roof ridge divides the two sections of the third floor. The front area is further subdivided into a large and small room. Much of the original wooden trim exists amid the reproduction doors.

== History ==
The history of the house is most noted in reference to the story of Stephen Myers. He did not own it, but was its second and most famous resident.

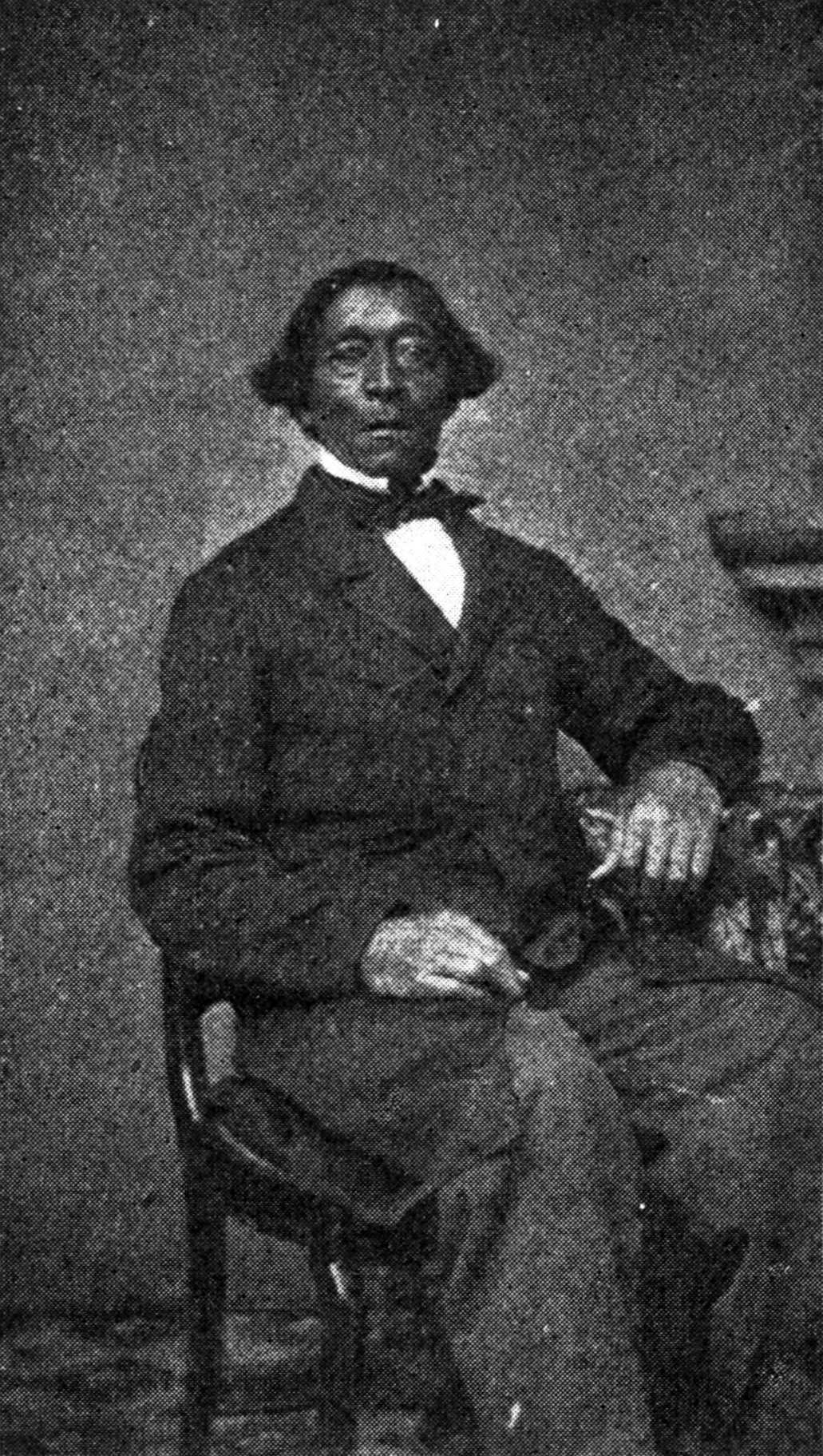
The only known photograph of Myers

=== 1800–1846: early life ===
Stephen Myers was born into slavery around 1800 outside the Rensselaer County hamlet of Hoosick, northeast of Albany. He is listed in some records as having been set free by General Warren, but this appears to be a misidentification. A search of records suggests the actual identity is Colonel Warren who headed American forces at the Raid at Black Rock. No records of the manumission have been found in Albany County archives.

Over the next decade, he worked in a variety of positions, including grocer and steamboat steward. In 1827, he married Harriet Johnson in Troy, a short distance north of Albany on the opposite side of the river. The couple eventually had four children.

According to his later testimony, he began assisting escapees from slavery four years later. He was also active in the African American community that had been established in Albany from 1813 on. Many of its members had settled in Arbor Hill, often living in racially integrated working-class neighborhoods.

Myers advocated for work and education opportunities within the African American community, raising money for those causes personally. Among his supporters were John Clarkson Jay, grandson of John Jay, an early governor of New York and first Chief Justice of the United States. A later historian claims Myers helped found an African-American school in the city, at what is now Israel African Methodist Episcopal Church on Hamilton Street. Myers was the first superintendent of the school at the African Methodist Episcopal Church. He fought successfully to establish clearer voting rights for African Americans, (Note: While New York at the time did not bar men from voting on the basis of race, the property qualification required at the time had the practical effect of disenfranchising almost all the African Americans in the state.) starting the Albany Suffrage Club and serving as president of the New York State Suffrage Association, personally lobbying state legislators. He also vocally opposed the use of public funds to buy land in Africa and repatriate slaves there.

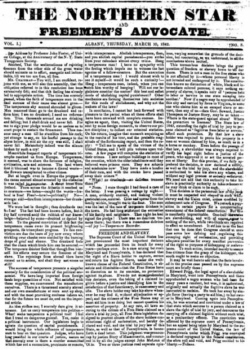
The Northern Star

His first venture into newspaper publishing, The Elevator, took place briefly during this period. Later in the decade Myers became involved with the Northern Star Association, which assisted escaping slaves and published a newspaper, The Northern Star and Freemen's Advocate. Its articles and editorials, many written by Myers, argued against slavery and for temperance and African American self-help, education and employment. The association was initially a rival to Albany's older Vigilance Committee, whose membership was drawn from a wider base, including the city's more established African American families and many religious denominations that vocally opposed slavery. The Vigilance Committee also published a newspaper called the Tocsin of Liberty.

The two organizations, through their newspapers, criticized each other for not doing an effective job of assisting those escaping from slavery, and freedmen in the Albany area who already had. At one point, shortly after the association had been founded, the Tocsin accused Myers of pocketing money meant for the committee. In fact, he had only accepted the money on behalf of the association, since it was for whom the money was intended rather than the committee.

In the mid-1840s the animosity between the two cooled following the deaths of two prominent clergymen in the Vigilance Committee, both in martyrdom to the cause. Abel Brown, a Baptist minister, contracted fatal pneumonia on a trip to Western New York where he was preaching against slavery. The other, Charles Torrey, who had been one of Myers' chief accusers, was arrested in Maryland for assisting escaped slaves and died in prison there two years later. Back in Albany, the two groups effectively merged and Stephen Myers became chair of the enlarged Vigilance Committee.

From the new position, Myers became prominent in the abolition movement beyond Albany. He not only continued publishing The Northern Star, but appeared at anti-slavery events and conferences in the region, sometimes sharing the podium with Frederick Douglass, who in later life cited him specifically as key to the Underground Railroad. From the Myers' house, fugitives were sent along to the west, eventually to cross into Canada and freedom.

=== 1847: construction of house ===
In 1847 John Johnson, an African American who captained a sloop named Miriam (according to Munsell's historical Annals of Albany) in the slips near the base of Livingston Avenue, then called Lumber Street due to the large homes of the many lumber company executives built near the slips, built the house at what was then number 198. The neighborhood at the time was predominantly working class, with many residents working on the boats or slips for the executives down the hill. City directories of the era show an Abram Johnson living nearby; According to the 1855 Census, John was his son and Harriet, who married Stephen Myers, his daughter.

John Johnson owned the house; it is not known under what arrangement Stephen Myers and his family lived there. No architect is known; it seems to have been a standard Albany rowhouse of the mid-19th century. It is distinguished as an Albany townhouse from otherwise similar structures in Troy by its rear stairwell with its 180-degree turns and dropped windows. Johnson and his builders seem to have followed the plan strictly, leaving the sides windowless even though there was little likelihood that an attached structure would later be built next door since there was already a house in the rear that needed street access.

=== 1848–1870s: later life ===
Two years after moving into the new house, in 1849, Myers merged The Northern Star with another upstate abolitionist newspaper, The True American, published by Samuel Ringgold Ward in Cortland. The combined paper, published from Syracuse, was called The Impartial Citizen. It lasted only another two years before going bankrupt.

The 1850s were difficult times for anti-slavery activists, particularly those involved in running the Underground Railroad, due to the passage of a tougher Fugitive Slave Act which required law enforcement in all states to assist in the recapture of those escaping from slavery, and increased penalties against those who assisted escapees. Myers started another newspaper, The Telegraph and Journal, but closed it again in 1855, imploring subscribers in its last issue to subscribe instead to Douglass's newspaper to further the cause.

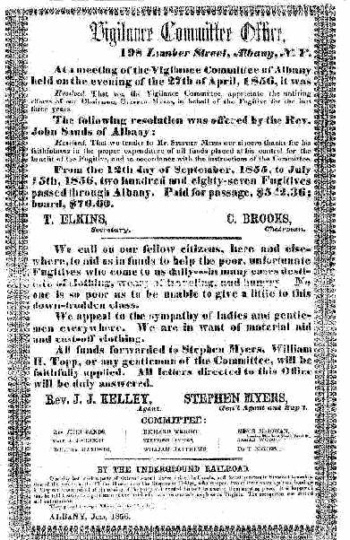
Vigilance Committee resolution honoring Myers and giving house address as 198 Lumber Street

In 1850, Myers had been elected to the executive committee of the American League of Colored Laborers, part of his continuing activism beyond abolition. Two years later he stepped down as chair of the Vigilance Committee, but continued his efforts for the Underground Railroad. In early 1856 the Vigilance Committee passed a resolution honoring him for having assisted 287 fugitives in less than a year. A later historian of African American abolitionists wrote that Myers' house "had the reputation of being the best-run part of the Underground Railroad in the state."

Paul Stewart, a historian who has worked on the restoration of the house, says the Myerses were very open about what they were doing and hospitable to the fugitives who passed through. "When you say Underground Railroad, you think of a lot of secrecy and people hiding in corners ... But the closer you look at things, the more you learn. They entertained people at their dinner table. They probably had them sleeping in the upstairs bedroom. It's not like they were hiding them in the basement." Myers sent many of them on to stations at Syracuse or Oswego. Some went directly north, the shorter route to Canada, usually via steamboats along Lake Champlain.

Without the newspapers, Myers had to find other employment. In August 1860 he was working as a butler in Lake George. Back in Albany, Harriet kept the station running. She wrote to William Jay that she assisted ten fugitives that month. At the end of the year, Stephen told Jay that he had received more in the preceding two months than any period of four months since he had started his Underground Railroad work.

This was due to the imminent start of the American Civil War. As the cause he had fought for all his adult life became the focus of armed conflict, Myers remained active. He organized local celebrations of the Emancipation Proclamation in 1863, and personally recruited soldiers for the 54th Regiment Massachusetts Volunteer Infantry and other black units raised by that state.

After the Union victory in 1865, Harriet Myers died. Her obituary notes her service in assisting those escaping from slavery, and the support she provided her husband in running his newspapers. Five years later, Stephen died. The Albany Evening Times reported that he had most recently been working as a janitor for former Union Army general Patrick Henry Jones, then serving as New York City's postmaster. "[He] did more for his people than any other colored man living, not excepting Fred[erick] Douglass," the paper claimed. His is buried in Albany Rural Cemetery Albany Rural Cemetery, a common final resting place for city residents of the era.

=== 1871–present: decline and restoration ===
After the Myers family, the house passed through a succession of other owners. By the middle of the 20th century, it was unoccupied and was showing signs of urban decay. Many of the surrounding houses from the previous century in the Arbor Hill neighborhood were demolished based on a 1962 urban renewal plan. The Myers house, along with some of the older houses near it, was spared.

The neglect continued, however, and by the 21st century the house had become county property through tax foreclosure. Local historian Paul Stewart and his wife, Mary Liz, after researching Myers and his work, formed the Underground Railroad History Project of the Capital Region, hosting an annual conference on slavery with speakers from around the world starting in 2001. The group was able to buy the property from the county in 2004 for $1,500 (~$2,557 in 2025).

For the next several years, the organization raised money to restore the house, with the goal of making it a historic house museum devoted to Myers and the local Underground Railroad. The state's Environmental Protection Fund (EPF) gave them a $50,000 grant at first; by 2007, when the first work got underway, over half a million dollars had been raised. Four years later the EPF came through with a $350,000 (~$451,274 in 2024) grant, a quarter of which had to be matched. The exterior restoration was completed in 2015, the same year the Stephen and Harriet Myers Residence was opened to the public.

In 2021, the Stephen and Harriet Myers Residence became part of the African American Civil Rights Network.

== See also ==
- National Register of Historic Places listings in Albany, New York
