= Ten Broeck =

Ten Broeck can refer to:

- Ten Broeck (surname)
- Ten Broeck (horse), Hall of Fame racehorse
- Ten Broeck, Alabama
- Ten Broeck, Kentucky
- Ten Broeck Mansion, historic American mansion in Albany, New York
- Ten Broeck Elementary School, Canada
- Ten Broeck Academy, a public school in Franklinville, New York
- Ten Broeck Triangle, part of the Arbor Hill Historic District in Albany, New York
  - The Ten Broeck Historic District, the original name for that historic district
