= Broeck =

Broeck (Dutch pronunciation: [bruk]) may refer to:

- Van den Broeck, Dutch surname
- Ten Broeck (disambiguation), Dutch surname
