= Arbor Hill, Albany, New York =

Neighborhood in New York, United States

Coordinates: 42°39′40″N 73°44′58″W

Arbor Hill City of Albany
- Neighborhood
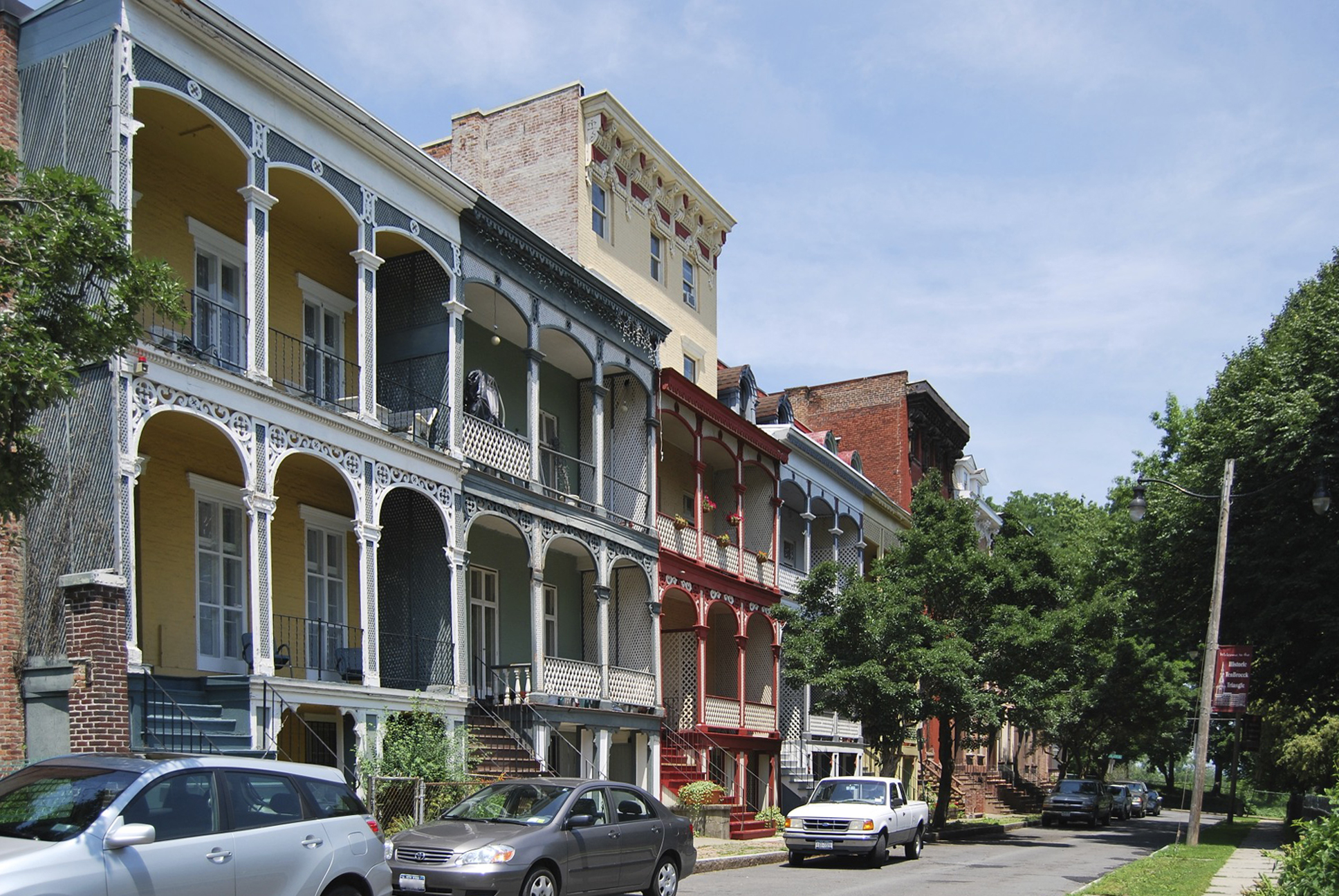
- Historic housing in the Ten Broeck section of Arbor Hill
- Etymology: for a nickname of the Ten Broeck Mansion
- Interactive map of Arbor Hill
- Country: United States
- State: New York
- County: Albany County
- City: Albany
- Settled: 17th century
- Time zone: UTC-5 (Eastern Standard Time)
  - Summer (DST): UTC-4 (Eastern Daylight Time)

Arbor Hill is a neighborhood in Albany, New York, generally defined as the area from Clinton Avenue north to Tivoli Hollow and the Livingston Avenue Railroad Bridge and from Broadway west to Henry Johnson Boulevard. Both Clinton Avenue and Henry Johnson Boulevard are signed as U.S. Route 9. It was outside Albany's first boundaries as set up in the Dongan Charter of 1686. The original name of the area was Colonie (which is applied now to the current town to the north), and the area was incorporated under that name as a village in 1804; it was annexed by Albany in 1815. There are two sub-neighborhoods in Arbor Hill, Dudley Heights and the Ten Broeck Triangle. "Arbor Hill" was the name given to the Ten Broeck estate; the Ten Broeck Mansion is still an important cultural and historical museum. The neighborhood has other historical and cultural sights such as the Palace Theatre and St. Joseph's Church. Demographically it is predominantly African-American.

== History ==
The Albany neighborhood of Arbor Hill had its start as a rural section of the neighboring town of Watervliet. The area was referred to as "the Colonie" and would be incorporated as a municipality in 1791, but would stay within Watervliet. Colonie would become incorporated again, this time as a district in 1801, and then as a village in 1804. In 1808 Colonie separated from Watervliet as a separate town. The trustees of the town, the voters of the town, and the common council of the city of Albany all approved annexation of the town to the city. The state on February 25, 1815, passed "An ACT to annex the Town of Colonie to the City of Albany".

Many of the workers involved in building the Erie Canal settled here in the 1820s, but by the late 19th century the area—especially the Ten Broeck Triangle section—became exclusive, catering to the new lumber industry barons. By the mid-20th century the decline of Albany's lumber industry led to a decline in fortunes for Arbor Hill.

Once exclusive and prosperous, after the Great Depression, it became a distressed light industrial and residential neighborhood . In the early 20th Century, it was mostly settled by a mix of immigrants from Europe, but primarily Irish-Americans. During the administration of mayor Erastus Corning II (1942 to 1983), urban sprawl contributed to white flight, and the area lost much of its population. By the end of the 20th century, it became demographically predominantly African-American.

The neighborhood police unit for Arbor Hill was introduced in September 1972 and funded by the federal Law Enforcement Administration Agency (LEAA), which paid for the staffing and training of 48 officers. As the LEAA fell victim to budget cuts, the city was left with little money for maintaining the units and staffing fell to 32 officers. Within one week a firebomb destroyed the building at the corner of Second and Lark streets. The unit then moved to a storefront at 133 Northern Boulevard (today Henry Johnson Boulevard), where it remained until April 4, 1986, when the unit was closed.

The New Covenant Charter School was opened in Arbor Hill in 1999 as the first in the city and only the second in the state amid huge support as a means to reach minority and underperforming students. The school had miserable scores and high turnover in both the student population and among teachers. The charter school was finally closed in 2010. New Covenant was the second of the first three charter schools to close, the second to close in the Capital District and only the eighth in the state to be closed.

== Geography ==
Arbor Hill includes the section of Albany west from Broadway to Henry Johnson Boulevard and north from Sheridan Hollow to Tivoli Hollow.

== Education ==
Arbor Hill has one public elementary school (not counting charter schools): Arbor Hill Elementary School, at 1 Arbor Drive. Demographically, it is 89% Black, 5% Latino, 4% Multiracial, 1% White, and 1% Asian or Pacific Islander. 73% of students are eligible for the free or reduced price lunch program, and 3% have limited English proficiency. The attendance rate is 92%. The average class size is 18 students, and the student body is 393 students in K–6 as of 2007.

== See also ==
- Arbor Hill Historic District–Ten Broeck Triangle
- Neighborhoods of Albany, New York
- Clinton Avenue Historic District (Albany, New York)
- History of Albany, New York
