= Stephen Myers (abolitionist) =

American abolitionist

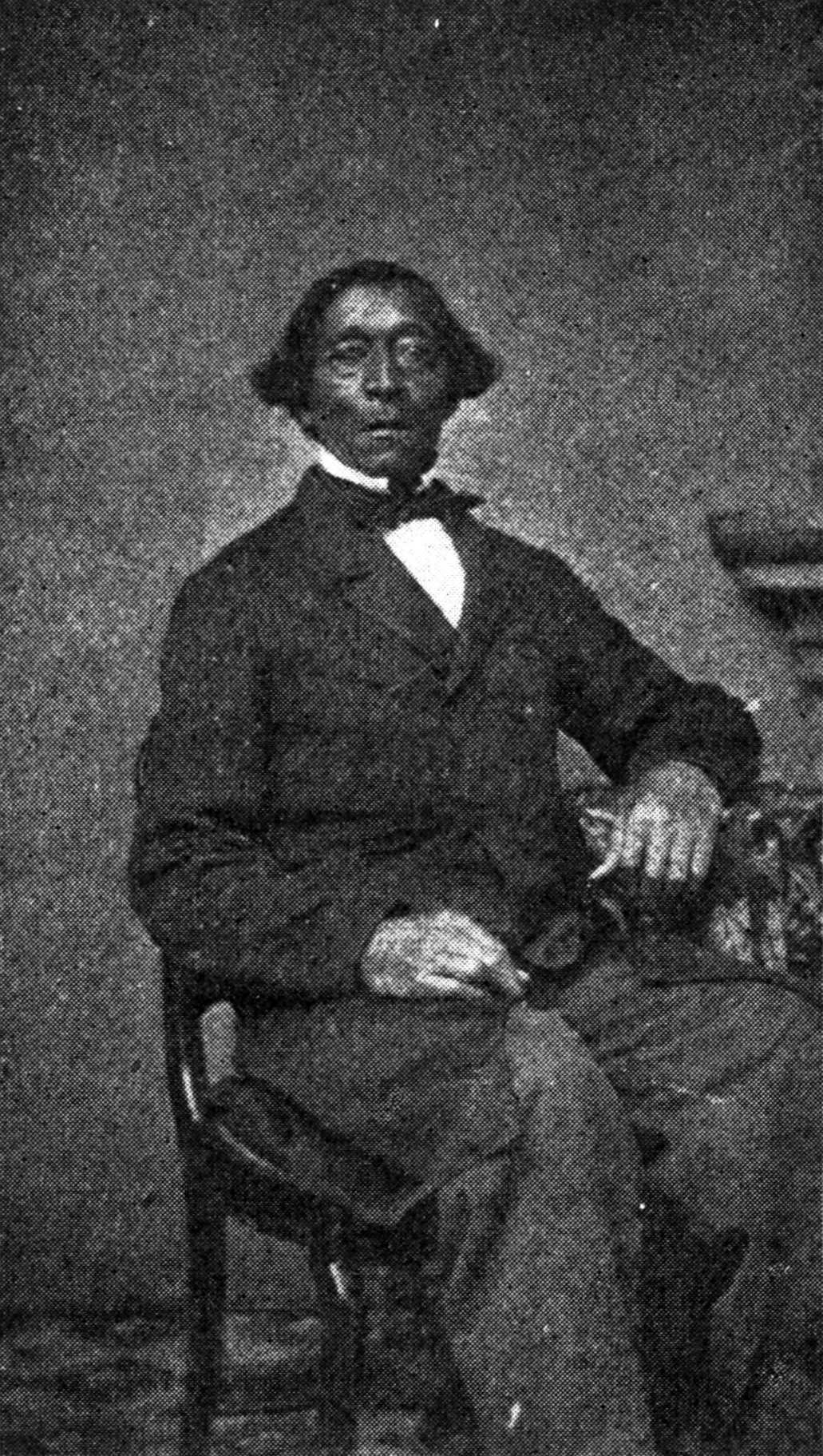
- Born: c. 1800; Albany, New York
- Died: February 13, 1870 (aged 69–70); Albany, New York
- Occupations: Abolitionist, Newspaper editor

Stephen Myers (c. 1800 – February 13, 1870) was an abolitionist and agent of the Underground Railroad through the 1830s–1850s. He was also the editor of multiple abolitionist newspapers such as The Elevator, The Northern Star, and Freeman's Advocate, and The Telegraph and Temperance Journal.

In 2022 Myers was inducted to the National Abolition Hall of Fame.

== Birth and early life ==
Stephen Myers was born a slave in Hoosick, New York, around the year 1800. At the age of 18, he was given his freedom by Lt. Colonel Warren of Vermont. He met Harriet Johnson and married her in Troy, New York, in 1827. Stephen and his wife resided in numerous houses in the city of Albany before moving to 198 Lumber Street in Albany.

== Background ==
Stephen and his wife Harriet provided safe houses for freedom seekers and supplied them with financial support through the Vigilance Committee. He also organized the Florence Farming and Lumber Association, an economic development project, and was the vice president of the American Council of Colored Laborers, a trade and skills organization. Following these roles, he served as a central actor of the New York State Suffrage Association by lobbying the New York State legislature for African-American suffrage.

Myers became a member of the Albany Vigilance Committee in the 1850s and served as the organization's chairman for more than three years. The fundraising and primary return address for correspondence for the Vigilance Committee was run through the Myers's home address which also served as a safe house for freedom seekers during their escape to the North.

Myers is noted as an important contributor and agent of the Underground Railroad by many different abolitionists. He collaborated with Samuel Ringgold Ward on journalistic activities, spoke at the Liberty Street Presbyterian Church pastored by Henry Highland Garnet, and shared the speaking stage with Frederick Douglass. Myers eventually merged the Northern Star with another newspaper known as the True American to create the Impartial Citizen, which published out of Syracuse, New York. This paper ceased publication two years later after its editor and publisher, Samuel Ringgold Ward, fled to Canada after his involvement in the Jerry Rescue.

== Later life and death ==
Myers spent the rest of his life aiding the Underground Railroad and recruiting for the United States Colored Troops. His wife Harriet died in 1865; Myers himself died five years later at his son's Jefferson Street home in Albany on February 13, 1870, and was buried at Albany Rural Cemetery.

== See also ==
- Stephen and Harriet Myers Residence
