= Saint Joseph's Church (Albany, New York) =

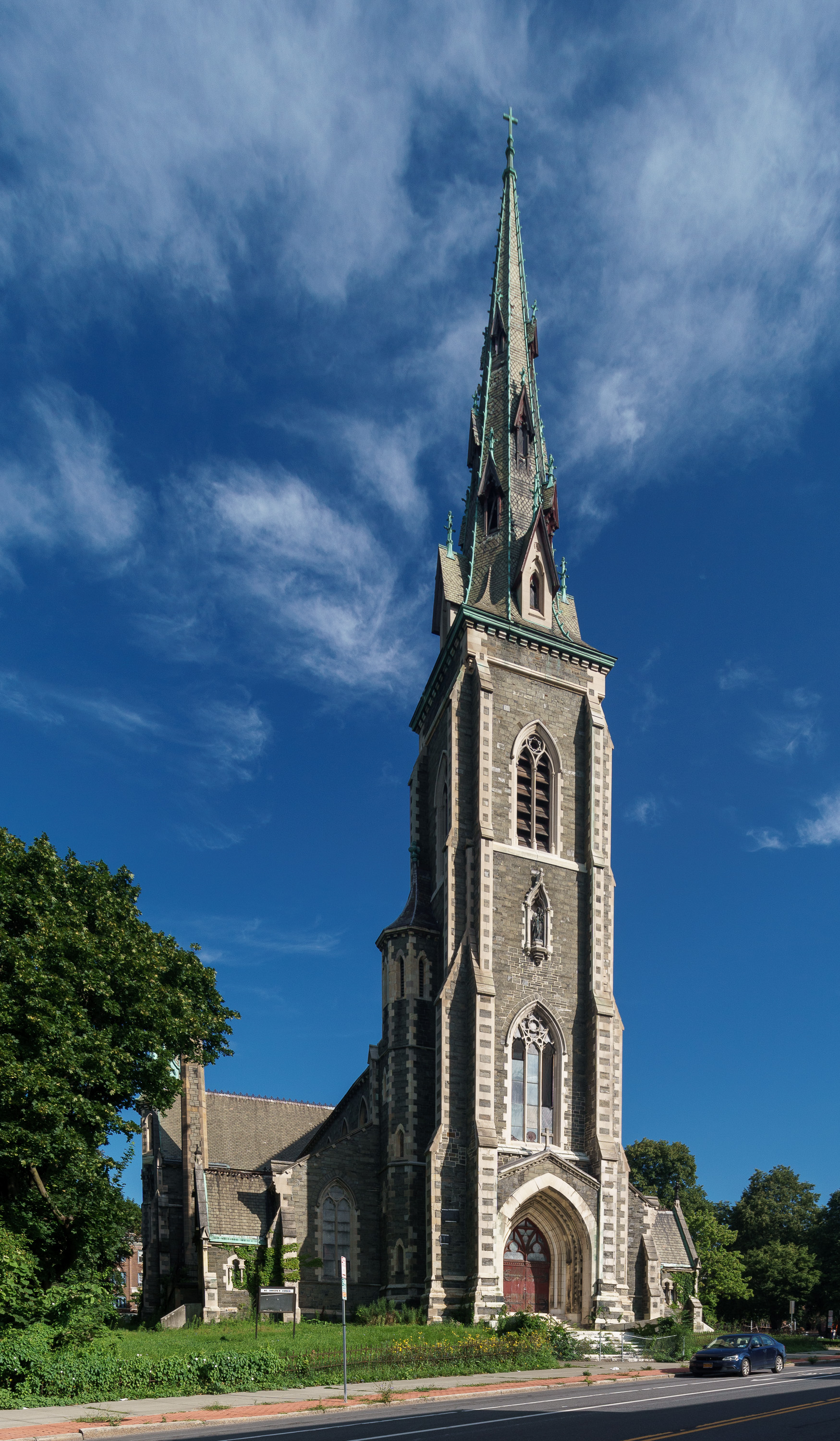
- St. Joseph's Church in Ten Broeck Triangle
- Saint Joseph's Church
- Location: Albany, New York
- Country: United States
- Denomination: Catholic

Architecture
- Architect: Patrick Keely
- Architectural type: Neo-gothic
- Completed: 1860
- Construction cost: $250,000
- Closed: 1994

Specifications
- Length: 212 feet (65 m)
- Width: 116 feet (35 m)
- Materials: Blue limestone

St. Joseph's Church is a historic neo-gothic church edifice in the Ten Broeck Triangle section of Albany, New York's Arbor Hill neighborhood. The structure is considered a city landmark and an important part of the Albany skyline. The church closed in 1994. The City of Albany placed the church for sale in February 2023.

== History ==
The St. Joseph's Church that is the subject of this article is the second church to hold this name in Albany. The first was an earlier Roman Catholic church that was the third Catholic church built in the city and the first built north of Downtown Albany. (Note: By 1842, a church to serve the large increase in the Roman Catholic population of the northern area of Albany was needed because the only Catholic churches that existed at the time were St. Mary's in Downtown Albany and St. John's in the South End. The first St. Joseph's Church was built on the northeast corner of North Pearl Street and Lumber Street (today Livingston Avenue). Built in 1842 and dedicated in 1843 at a cost of $28,000, it soon became too small for its growing congregation. After the second St. Joseph's Church was built, the first St. Joseph's Church was sold to a bakery.) St. Joseph's Church was built on Ten Broeck Street between First Street and Second Street. The site of the church was purchased for $45,000. Patrick Keely, who had also designed the Cathedral of the Immaculate Conception, was the architect. Ground was broken in 1855, the cornerstone was laid in 1856, and St. Joseph's Church was completed in 1860 at a cost of approximately $250,000. In attendance at the dedication were all the bishops in the ecclesiastical Province of New York, including the Bishop of Albany and the Archbishop of New York, the Bishop of Boston, and the Bishop of Newfoundland. In 1876, the church congregation incorporated.

Due to parish financial needs, St. Joseph's Church was sold to Marine Colonel Bronislaus A. Gill in 1981. In his book O Albany!: Improbable City of Political Wizards, Fearless Ethnics, Spectacular Aristocrats, Splendid Nobodies, and Underrated Scoundrels (1983), author William Kennedy stated that Gill gave The Roman Catholic Diocese of Albany, New York the option to buy back the property at the same price for which he purchased it. Gill also allowed the Diocese to continue to use St. Joseph's Church; however, as of 1983, the church was not in use and Mass was being held in the rectory basement. Kennedy asserted that St. Joseph's Church had an "uncertain future" and added that the "magnificent church" had become a "white elephant".

In 1985, the Black Apostolate of the Albany Roman Catholic Diocese was formed to encourage African-American former Catholics to return to the Catholic Church through worship that was aimed at African-American cultural traditions. The Black Apostolate's regular Mass was originally held at St. Joseph's Church. The Vietnamese Apostolate also called St. Joseph's Church home in the 1990s. In 1987, the church was the site of some scenes filmed for the movie Ironweed starring Jack Nicholson and Meryl Streep.

In 1994, St. Joseph's Church canonically merged with Sacred Heart of Jesus Church in North Albany, and the St. Joseph's Church building ceased to be used. By then, St. Joseph's Church needed up to $2 million worth of repairs to fix cracked stained-glass windows, a leaking roof, the building's foundation, and a rusted and collapsed iron fence. The Albany Diocese bought St. Joseph's Church back from Colonel Gill in 1996 for $30,000. The Diocese then organized a committee composed of representatives from the church, the Ten Broeck Triangle Preservation League, Historic Albany Foundation, New York State Office of Parks, Recreation and Historic Preservation, Mayor Jerry Jennings, Albany County Executive Michael Breslin, and NYS Assemblyman John McEneny to figure out new uses for the building. St. Joseph's Church continued to deteriorate from lack of use and maintenance and was included on the Historic Albany Foundations's Seven to Save list of endangered historical sites in 2000. That year, St. Joseph's Church was sold for $1 to the Abate family, which owned a pair of night club/restaurants in Troy and a restaurant on Lark Street in Albany. The sale to the Abate family faced opposition from Albany Mayor Gerald Jennings when it was discovered that the Abates' bar in Albany owed back city and school taxes. The Ten Broeck Triangle community also opposed the Abates' plans when it was discovered that they had applied for a zoning variance to allow for noon to 4:00 am operating hours for the banquet facility that they planned to open in the church building.

St. Joseph's Church

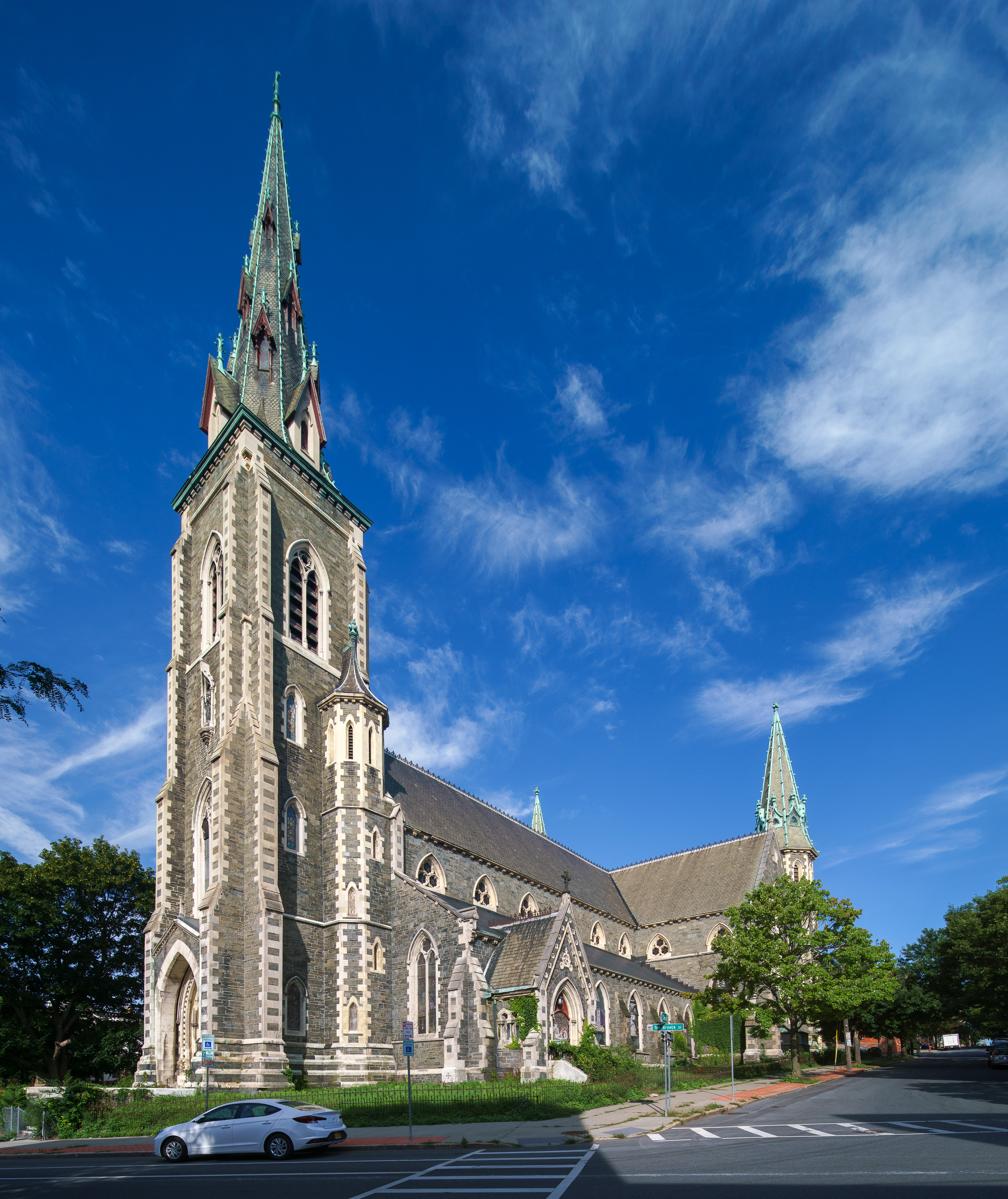
St. Joseph's in 2021

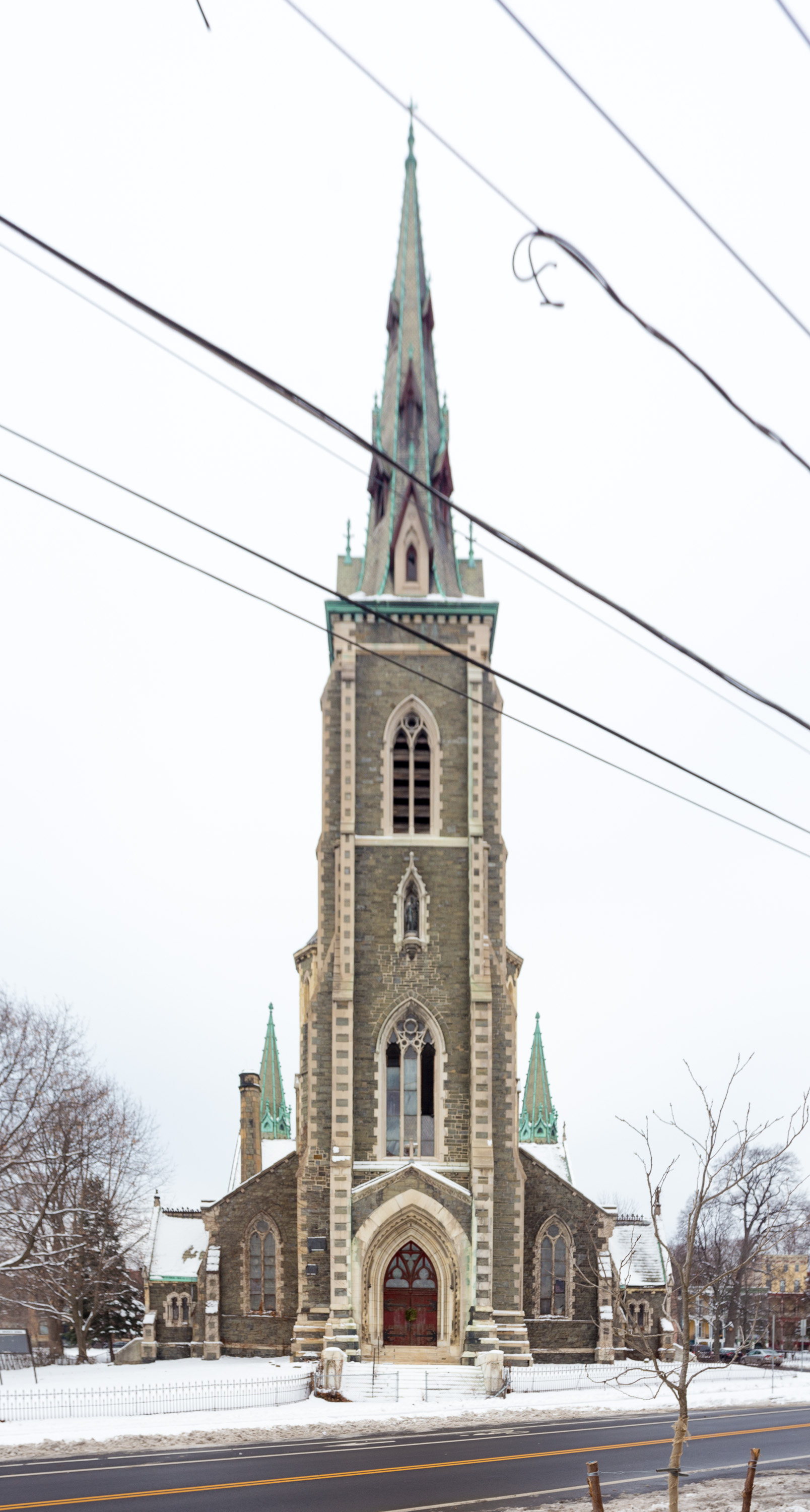
Front view, 2018

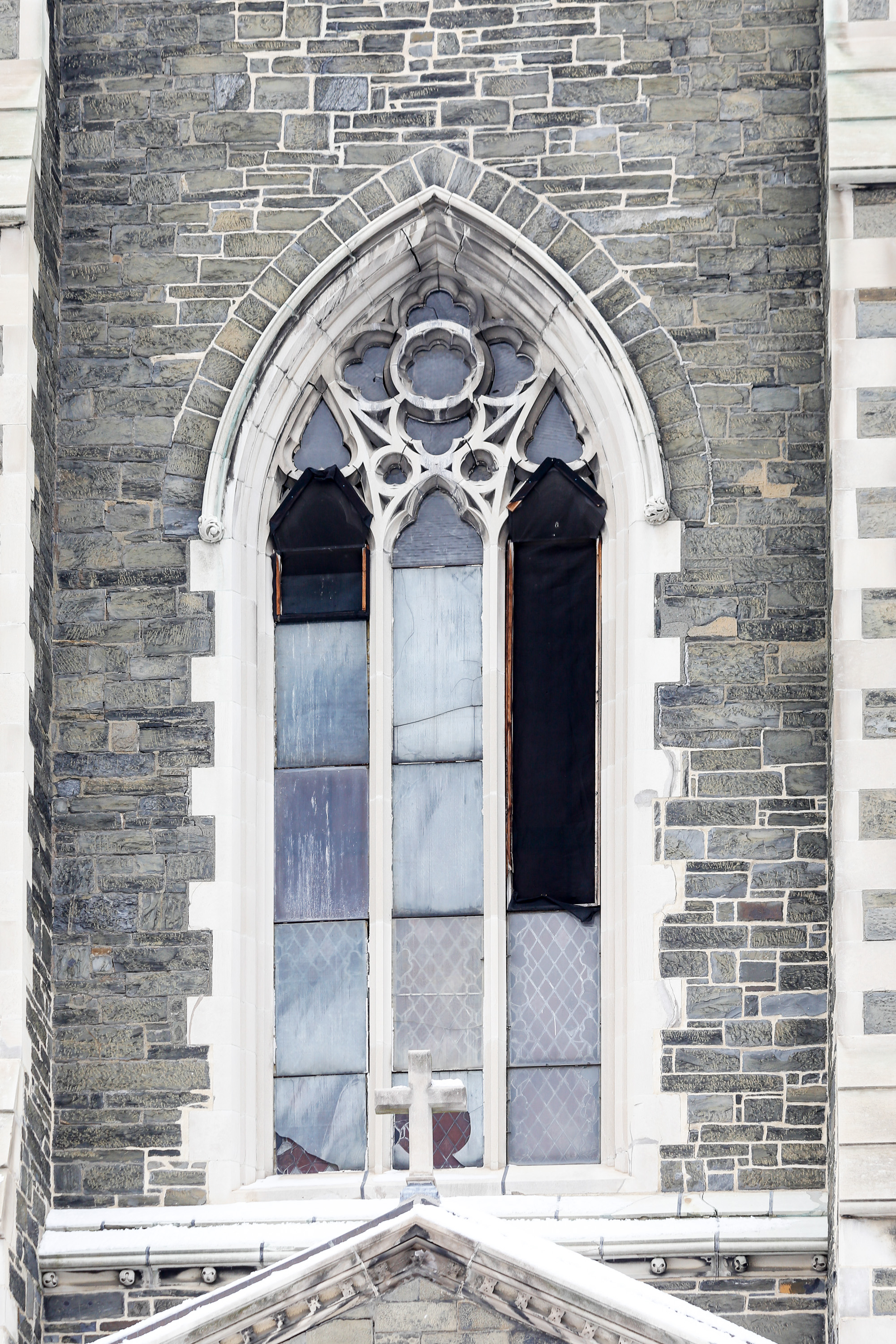
Broken windows, 2018

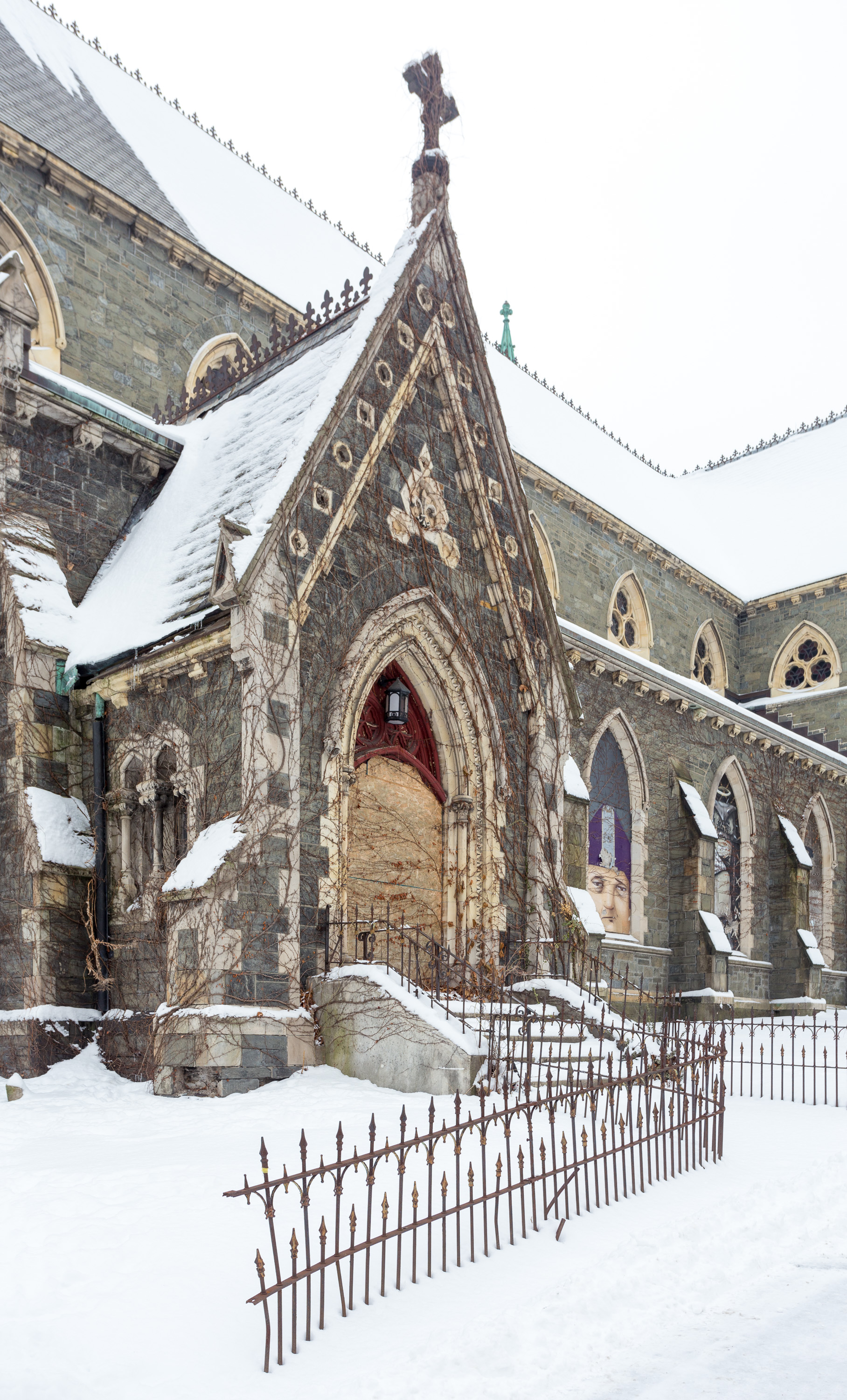
Boarded-up side entrance, 2018

When the city determined that St. Joseph's Church was in imminent danger of collapse during the winter of 2001, the building was condemned. Emergency work was done to shore up the support columns and roof. In January 2003, the city took the Abates to court to secure an emergency eminent domain order. Within a month, the city turned the property over to the Historic Albany Foundation, which had obtained a $300,000 matching grant from the state for continued work on the building. In 2007, after St. Joseph's Church was made safe for public use, the Historic Albany Foundation and the city hosted Obsequi (a multi-media performance of dance and music) there. Further art and musical performances continue to be hosted as fundraising events at the church. An annual Restoration Funstival (also known as the Restoration Festival or Rest Fest), which showcased local music and art with the intention of bringing national attention to local bands, was held at the church.

In May 2013, the Historic Albany Foundation announced that St. Joseph's Church would be returned to city ownership. HAF had reportedly spent more than $700,000 on the building. There had been plans to convert the structure into a pub, but local opposition prevented those plans from going forward. As of February 2019, St. Joseph's Church remains under city ownership. The City of Albany placed the church for sale in February 2023.

== Structure ==
St. Joseph's Church is 14,000 square feet (1,300 m^{2}), 212 feet (65 m) long, 116 feet (35 m) wide, and built of blue limestone trimmed with Ohio sandstone. It contains 14 marble columns and 16 stained glass windows. There are three towers on the church (one large tower in front and two smaller twins in the rear). The main tower is 235 feet (72 m) tall and houses 10 bells. There are nine small bells with one large bell. The church bells were cast at the Meneely Bell Foundry in Troy, New York at a cost estimated at $12,000 in 1906. The bells are activated through the pulling of oak levers in a chime room. The ceiling is in a hammerbeam roof–style of wooden beams projecting from the roof and walls carved ornately with angels and religious symbols. The limestone exterior was originally trimmed with Caen stone, but that type of limestone did not weather well and was replaced with Ohio sandstone in 1866.

The Protestant Asylum Hill Congregational Church in Hartford, Connecticut was based on the architectural plans for St. Joseph's.

== Notable pastors ==
- Very Reverend John J. Conroy became the second Bishop of Albany in 1865, but retained the pastorship of St. Joseph's until his retirement in 1877.
