= Arbor Hill Historic District–Ten Broeck Triangle =

Historic area of Albany, New York

- Arbor Hill Historic District– Ten Broeck Triangle
- U.S. National Register of Historic Places
- U.S. Historic district
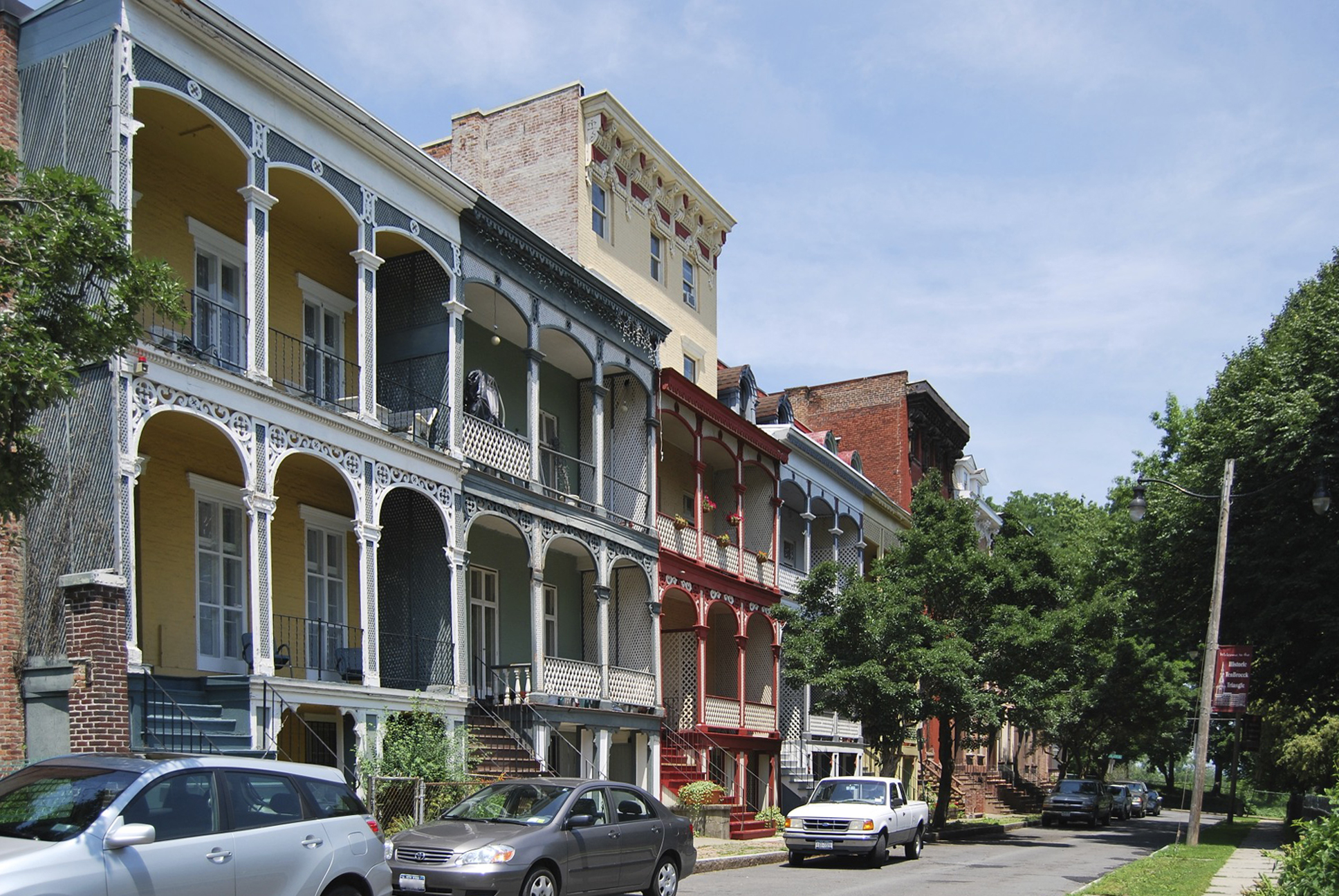
- Rowhouses on Hall Place, 2010

- Location within New York Location within the United States
- Interactive map showing the location of Arbor Hill-Historic District Ten Broeck Triangle
- Location: Albany, NY
- Coordinates: 42°39′26″N 73°45′5″W
- Area: 34 acres (14 ha)
- Built: 1845; 181 years ago – 1875; 151 years ago
- Architectural style: Greek Revival, Italianate, Late Victorian
- NRHP reference No.: 79001564 (original); 84003865 (increase)

Significant dates
- Added to NRHP: January 25, 1979
- Boundary increase: September 29, 1984

The Arbor Hill Historic District–Ten Broeck Triangle, originally the Ten Broeck Historic District, is a seven-block area located within the Arbor Hill neighborhood north of what is today downtown Albany, New York, United States. In 1979 its easternmost third, the Ten Broeck Triangle, the second oldest residential neighborhood in the city, was recognized as a historic district and listed on the National Register of Historic Places. Four years later, the district was increased to its current size and renamed to reflect its expansion to include some of the rest of Arbor Hill.

The future district was first established by its oldest contributing property, the Ten Broeck Mansion, built at the end of the 18th century by a prominent local family. It lent its name to the Ten Broeck Triangle, established in the middle of the following century when successful businessmen, primarily lumber dealers, built large houses along Ten Broeck Avenue with the fortunes they had made from trade on the Erie Canal. It was one of the first neighborhoods to develop north of the city's downtown as it grew during the 19th century.

Its fortunes began to slip as the city expanded westward to new neighborhoods like Washington Park which attracted the city's affluent. As the 20th century began, it gradually became a more middle-class neighborhood, then, after the Great Migration, predominantly African American. As an effective racial ghetto, the neighborhood and its historic buildings suffered the effects of disinvestment and decline. The designation of the historic district, and other efforts by preservationists later in the century, have begun to reverse that trend. In the late 2010s Albany mayor Kathy Sheehan and her husband bought and rehabilitated one of the district's vacant townhouses to make their home.

Over 200 buildings, mostly a mix of rowhouses and detached houses built between the 1840s and 1870s, are listed as contributing properties. The largest, the Ten Broeck Mansion, is also the only property in the district listed on the Register individually. The district also includes two churches, including St. Joseph's Church, reflecting a later popularity with immigrants.

== Geography ==
The district occupies the southeastern portion of Albany's Arbor Hill neighborhood. Its southern corner is Sweet Pilgrim Baptist Church at the junction of Ten Broeck Street and Clinton Avenue (part of U.S. Route 9), a block west of the Palace Theatre and across from Albany's Family Court building. The district's boundary, at that point also the eastern boundary of the Broadway portion of the Clinton Avenue Historic District follows the rear lot lines of all the houses on the east side of the street, past St. Joseph's Church and Van Rensselaer Park north to Livingston Avenue. There, the Ten Broeck Mansion, originally known as Arbor Hill, which later became the name for the district, occupies a large parcel at the intersection's southwest corner.

The boundary then turns northwest along the south side of Livingston and follows it to North Swan Street, which it turns to follow south. A hundred feet (30 m) south of the intersection, it takes in the properties on the west side and continues to do so for the next three blocks. These include Bethany Baptist Church, St. Joseph's Youth Center and some commercial properties along the adjacent blocks and the public basketball courts at the Second Street intersection.

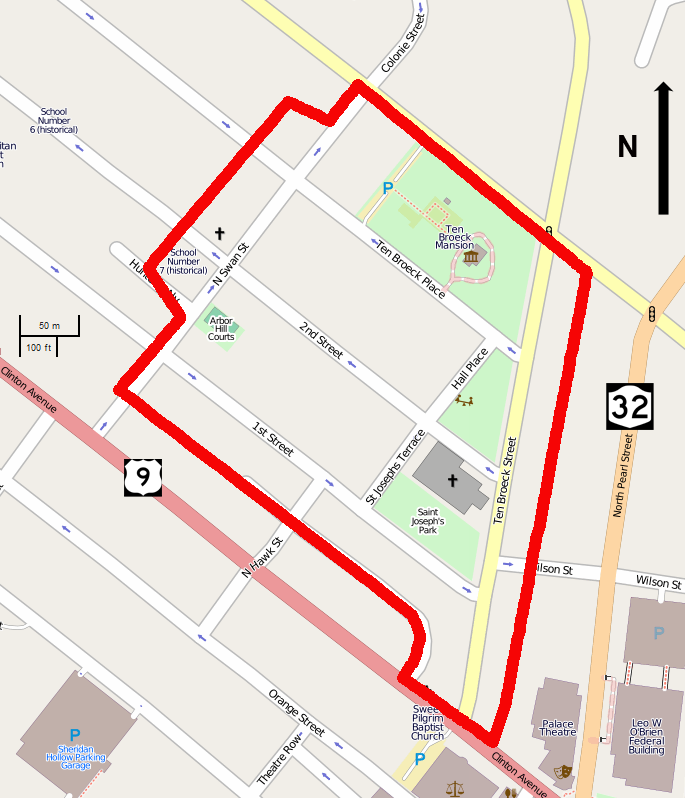
Map showing district boundary in red

Midway between First Street and Clinton the boundary turns southeast to follow the rear property line of the lots on First, again the boundary with the Clinton Avenue Historic District. This line becomes Ludlow Alley shortly before North Hawk Street. After a short southward jog to take in the two properties on that street north of Clinton, it returns to the alley and follows it back to Clinton at Ten Broeck.

The irregular polygon within this boundary includes six large blocks covering 34 acres (14 ha). In addition to the streets already named, the entirety of St. Joseph's Terrace and Hall Place are within the district. It has 220 contributing resources, with only two non-contributing modern properties. One hundred of those properties are houses, primarily two- to three-story wood frame or brick structures built between the 1820s and the early 20th century. The remainder are either small commercial buildings or institutional structures such as the three churches in the district.

Open space within the district is mostly planned, such as Van Rensselaer Park, the neighboring space around the church known as St. Joseph's park, and the large parcel at the district's northeast corner where the Ten Broeck Mansion and its gardens (and former carriage house) are located. There are a few vacant lots and parking lots. The expansion added North Swan Street Park and the basketball courts to the south. Mature trees are abundant throughout.

Topographically the district rises almost a hundred feet (30 m) from its eastern and southern edges to level terrain along North Swan between Second and Third. This reflects the ravine there, one of the few remaining from when Albany was first settled as most were later partially filled in to facilitate development, now the neighborhood of Sheridan Hollow, which separates Arbor Hill and the district from downtown Albany.

To the north of the district are newer housing projects built during the urban renewal projects of the 1960s and 1970s. On the west of North Swan are similar neighborhoods but with newer, less coherent architecture (One building near the district, the Stephen and Harriet Myers House, is listed on the Register). The Clinton Avenue Historic District on the south includes the city's densest concentration of 19th-century rowhouses, mostly brick. To the east, downhill to North Pearl Street (New York State Route 32), are neighborhoods of mixed older and newer buildings and vacant lots, slowly being redeveloped, closer to the Hudson River.

== History ==
The district has passed through several distinct historical periods. For a long time after Albany was established as a city, the district remained undeveloped and outside city limits, a place where the city might expand in the future. When it was developed, after independence, this was limited.

After the Erie Canal was built, the pace of development increased, requiring the removal of a cemetery. Most of the current stock of buildings date to the mid- and late 19th century when the district was one of Albany's most desirable addresses. Later, as the affluent moved to the suburbs in the early 20th century, it became denser, and in the 1920s came to be identified more with the city's growing African-American population.

Due to that racial stigma, the neighborhood declined in status over the course of the 20th century. That trend began to reverse with the formation of community organizations in the 1970s and serious, ongoing efforts at historic preservation and restoration.

=== 1686–1796: Prehistory ===
The settlement that became Albany was established by the Dutch in the early 17th century as Fort Orange. The development around it was known first as Wiltwyck, becoming Albany when the English assumed control of New Netherland in 1667. It formally became a city with the grant of the Dongan Charter in 1686. Then, and for many years after, it was confined to the fort and the area around it enclosed by a stockade, corresponding roughly to its present downtown. The prominent ridge beyond Sheridan Hollow to the north was first referred to as Arbor Hill during that period.

The stockade era reflected the threat that still existed to the frontier town from the French, which ended with the 1763 defeat of New France in the French and Indian War. The next year, Stephen van Rensselaer II, the patroon of his family's lands to the north of the city in what was then the town of Watervliet, including the future district, began having them surveyed. As the city could now safely expand, he had streets and building lots laid out in what came to be called Colonie, (Note: No relation to the current Town of Colonie, north of Albany.) largely along the lines they were actually built. He designated the land that is now the park named after his family to be the burying ground for inhabitants of his Rensselaerwyck manor.

=== 1797–1844: Early development ===
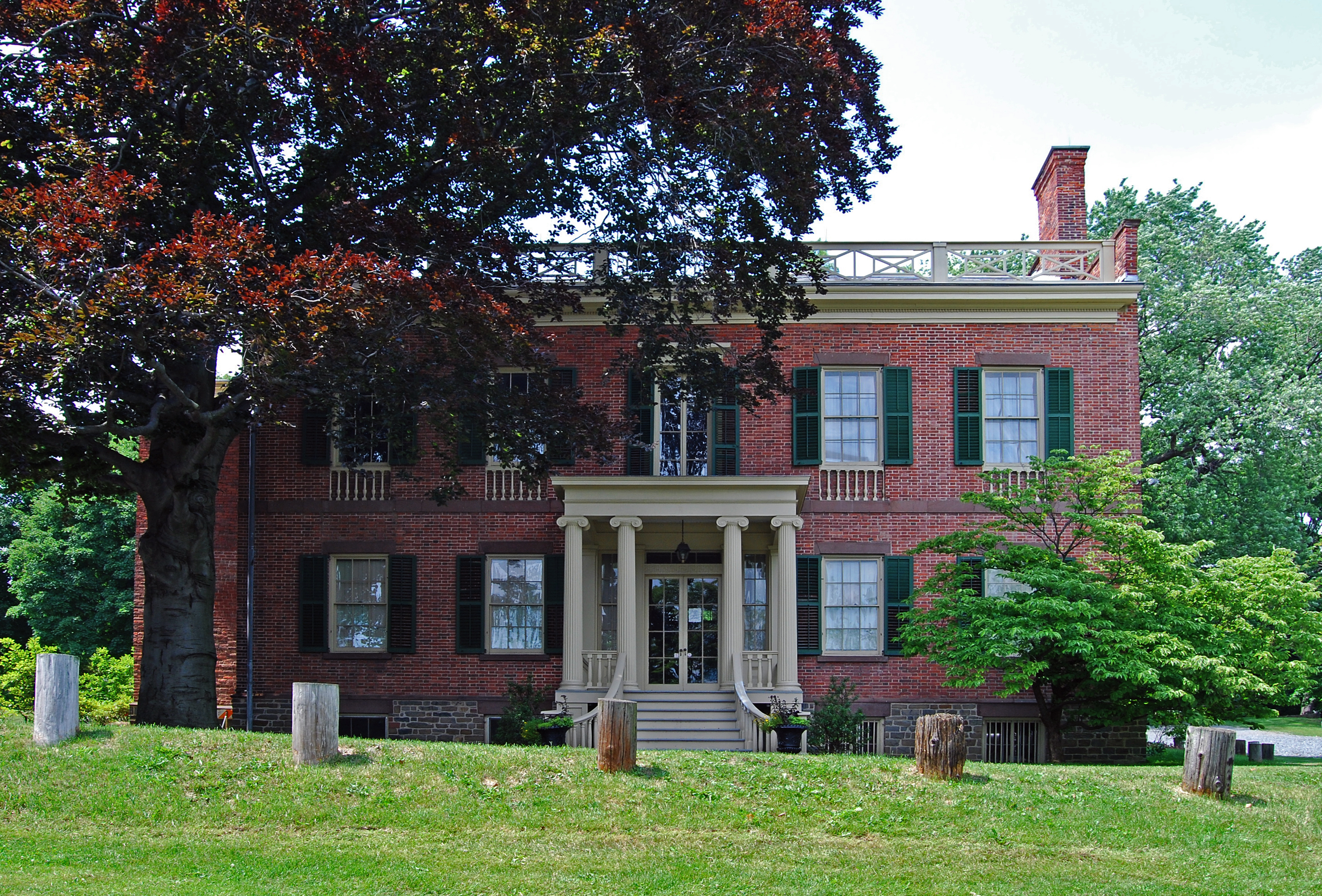
East (front) elevation of Ten Broeck Mansion, 2009

Development was delayed because of the Revolutionary War, but by the late 18th century some houses had been built in the area. Foremost among them was what is now known as the Ten Broeck Mansion, built by another landed descendant of Dutch settlers, Abraham Ten Broeck, after his previous house burned down. By 1797, when he and his wife Elizabeth built the brick Federal style mansion on five acres (2 ha) that they leased from her brother, Stephen van Rensselaer III, he had served as a delegate to the Second Continental Congress in 1775, a general commanding New York's militia at the Battle of Saratoga and later Albany's mayor and a state senator.

Ten Broeck named the mansion Prospect due to the commanding view it offered of the Hudson and its river traffic (some other accounts suggest he called it Arbor Hill from the beginning). He lived there until his death in 1810; Elizabeth survived him by three years. By that point a few other houses had likely been built nearby, but not enough to make the group a neighborhood, even after Colonie was annexed by the city in 1815. The mansion was sold to new owners who, over the next three decades, refurbished and expanded it with elements of the similar Greek Revival architectural style.

The northward expansion of the city envisioned by the elder van Rensselaer finally came to pass after 1825, when the Erie Canal was opened. Many new arrivals to the city, drawn by the canal and its economic opportunities, needed places to live and work. They looked north, along Broadway and North Pearl. Some found the mansion neighborhood and the blocks to its west to their liking, enough that city directories of the period show a few residents and businessmen listing "Arbor Hill" as their address. During the 1830s, they built some of the first houses in the district after the mansion. A few from this period, such as 10 Ten Broeck Place and 31 Second Street, survive. Similarly, the mixed-use Greek Revival buildings around the intersection of Second and South Swan were built in the early 1840s.

=== 1845–1899: Intensive development ===
Intensive development of the neighborhood was the result of an 1845 change. The soil of the Rensselaerwyck cemetery was particularly sandy and loose. Since it sat on a slope above the streets, heavy rains would often wash away markers and expose the underlying coffins and remains. By the early 1840s, there were many calls to move the bodies elsewhere. One of the most vocal advocates for such a move, Joseph Hall, a gardener who lived on the section of Third now known as Ten Broeck Place, had Hall Street named for him when it was opened in 1849, four years after the cemetery was moved.

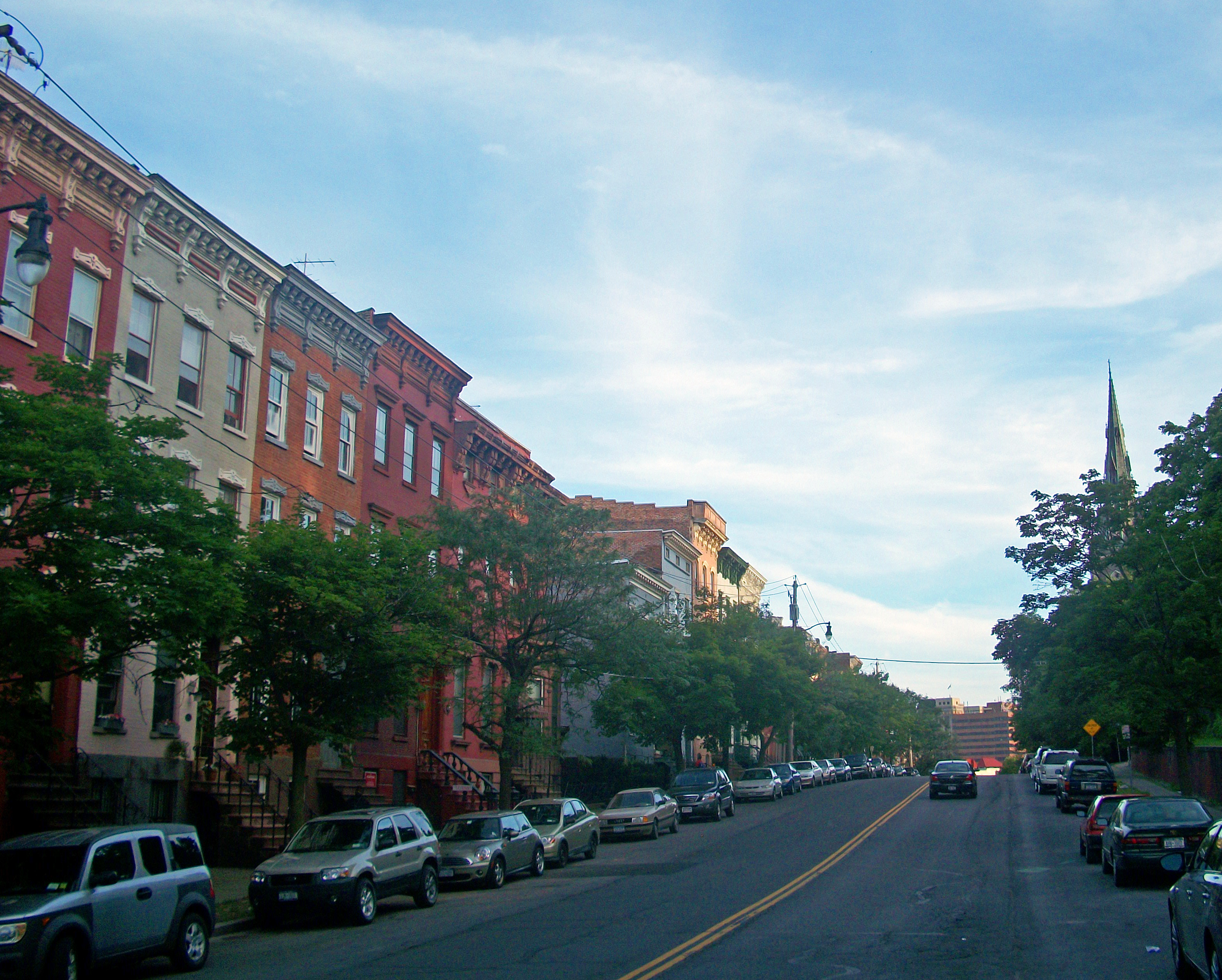
North end of Ten Broeck Street, 2010

While the former burying ground site was made into a park instead of being built on, construction on other parcels increased. The year the graves were moved, 41 Ten Broeck Street, the earliest dated house on that street after the mansion, was erected. The brick rowhouses at 15–23 and 35–39 Ten Broeck followed. In 1848, the neighborhood regained some of its original prestige when Thomas Worth Olcott, a prominent banker, bought the Ten Broeck Mansion and formally renamed it Arbor Hill. He and his family expanded it over the next several years. The King Building, an elaborate Greek Revival duplex, was built over four years in the 1850s at 27–29 North Swan in front of the archway that provided access to the mansion's grounds on the rear.

In the blocks to the west, newer clusters such as 53, 55 and 57 First Street joined the scattered houses that already existed. At 23 and 25 Second Street, two brick houses were built in the late 1840s. These show a common architectural transition for that era, with their basic Greek Revival forms being overlaid with Italianate and Gothic Revival ornament.

The Italianate style would become dominant in the 1850s, when a third of the hundred houses in the Ten Broeck Triangle, the eastern portion of the district, were built. North Hawk and Hall streets were built almost completely during this period. The rowhouses from 2–38 First Street went up between 1854 and 1862.

In 1855 St. Joseph's Church was built on Ten Broeck between First and Second to serve the growing Irish immigrant population, which generally did not live in the district but near it, close to their jobs along the riverfront. It was designed by Brooklyn architect Patrick Keely, himself an Irish immigrant, who had previously designed the Cathedral of the Immaculate Conception on Eagle Street downtown.

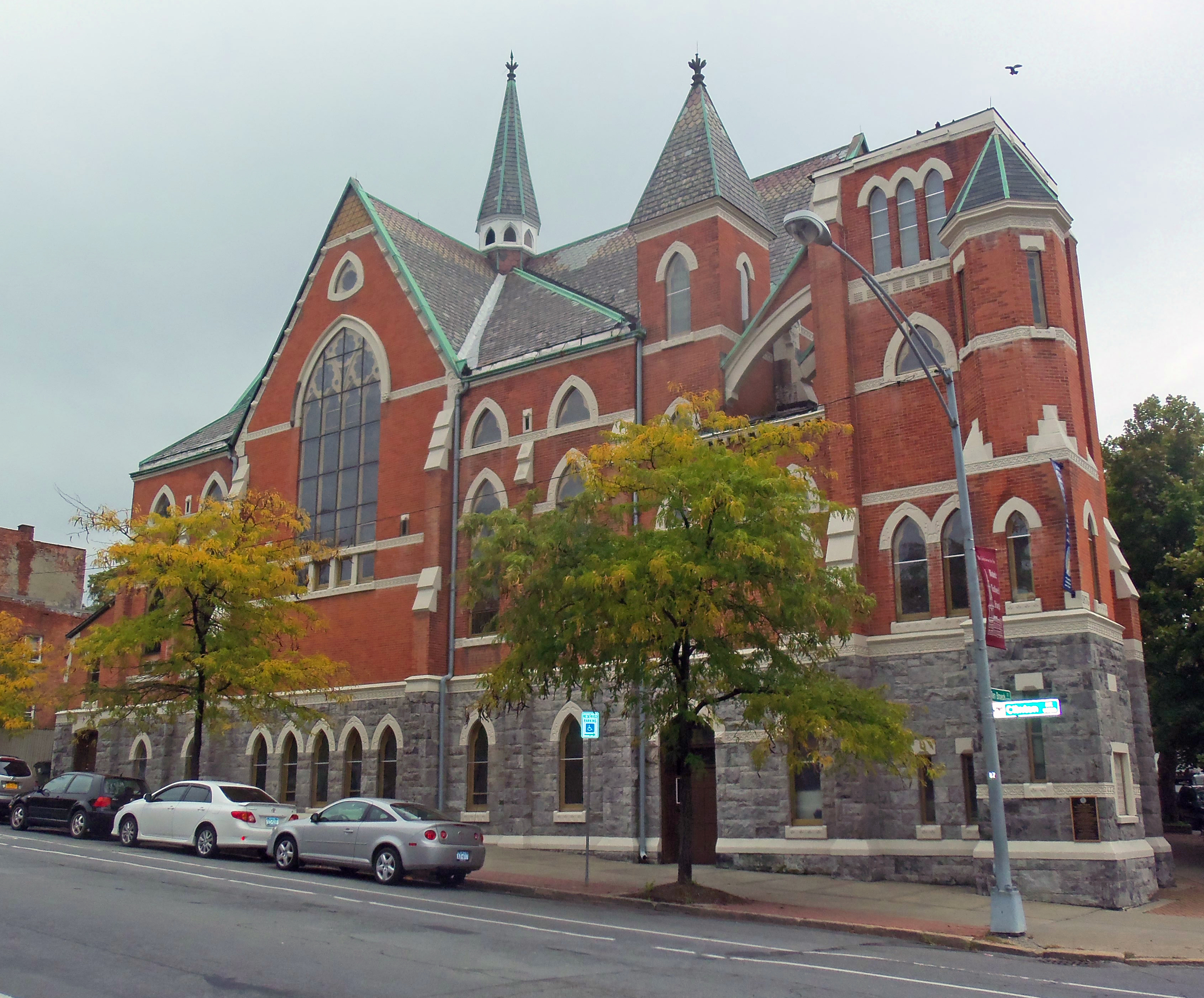
Sweet Pilgrim Baptist Church

By 1870, much of the district had been developed. The lavish houses in particular that lined Ten Broeck Street gave it the nickname "Millionaire's Row." Many had been built by lumber merchants and overlooked the Lumber District, the yards down by the canal and river where they did their business. Another church, Sweet Pilgrim Baptist, was constructed in 1876 at the Clinton Avenue intersection, giving the district a distinctive southern gateway. At the north corner, the polygonal home at 105 Ten Broeck featured an iron mansard roof, a hallmark of the contemporary Second Empire style. Some of the existing houses, such as 8 Hall Place, also had mansard roofs added when they were expanded with third stories.

There was enough demand for housing in the Ten Broeck Triangle that a new street was added in the ensuing decade. St. Joseph's Terrace was laid out in 1881 and formally subdivided for building ten years later. The houses built there in the 1890s were similar in form to those that had been built in the previous decades, reflecting the area's continuing status as a desirable neighborhood, despite increasing competition from the newer Washington Park, completed in 1882, and the lack of service from the city's new streetcar network. The neighborhood was home to Michael N. Nolan, an Irish immigrant who served as mayor and later, a member of the U.S. House of Representatives.

Architecturally, the new construction largely reflected contemporary trends. There were still a few late Italianate structures like 96 North Swan Street, built in 1885. But most new housing followed the Romanesque Revival of the late 19th century. The brick rectory with stone trim built by St. Joseph's in 1892 at 12 St. Joseph's Terrace is the district's most prominent example. At 51 and 51 1/2 First, a pair of brick houses built in 1885, the intricate detailing includes terra cotta and stained glass windows. The Romanesque houses at 67 Ten Broeck Street and 3 and 5 St. Joseph's Terrace are clad in the style's more common rusticated brownstone.

=== 1900–1914: Increasing density ===
In the new century, the neighborhood's growth slowed down as it was nearly built out. A few new houses were built, mostly architecturally sympathetic to their surroundings but experimenting slightly with their materials, such as local architect William Lee Woollett's brick houses with marble trim at 43 and 45 Ten Broeck Street in 1900. At 66 First Street another brick and stone house went up, sympathetic with its much older neighbors.

The affluent families that had lived in the Ten Broeck area began moving to the newer neighborhoods in the city's undeveloped western sections, which offered larger houses and larger lots in the newer suburban style of living. They rented the houses they left behind or sold them, with the result that many were subdivided into multiple units, making the Ten Broeck Triangle less exclusive than it had been for the previous 50 years.

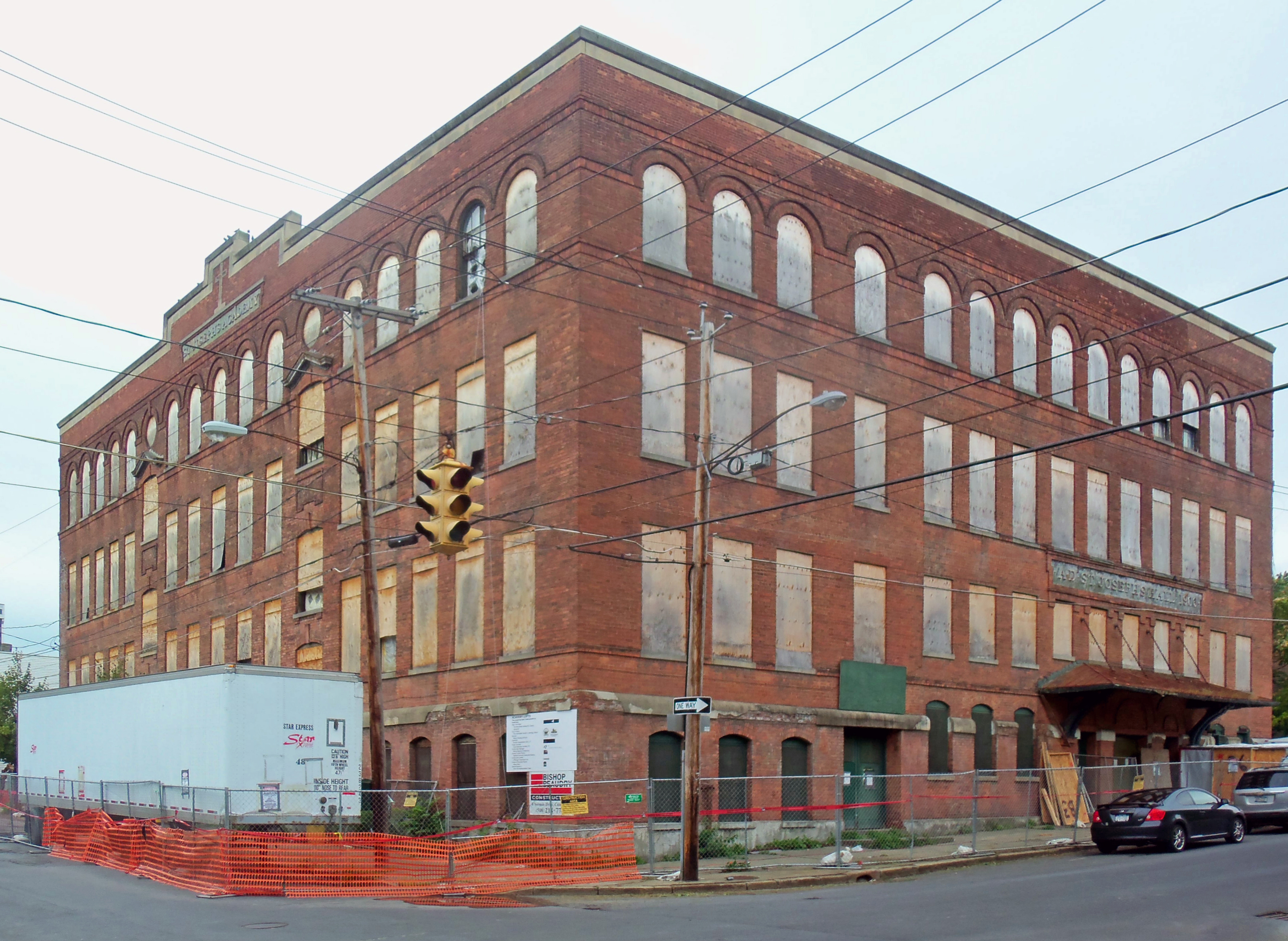
St. Joseph's School building, 2012

This increase in density was reflected in the most significant construction of the 20th century's first decade. St. Joseph's had housed its school in various other buildings, but finally had to construct one for the purpose. The four-story brick edifice with stone trim completed in 1905 was the largest building in the western blocks of the future district. Back on Ten Broeck Street, the church itself got a new spire in 1910.

The trend toward increasing density culminated in the construction of two apartment buildings, at 7–8 and 9–10 St. Joseph's Terrace, in 1914. Both brick with stone trim, one three stories and the other four, they were the first buildings in the neighborhood designed as multiple dwellings. Together with the nearby house at 3 St. Joseph's, a one-story brick building with marble trim and a Spanish-style pantile roof, built that same year, they are the latest-built contributing properties to the district.

=== 1915–1974: Decline and disinvestment ===
During the Great Migration of the 1920s, many of the African Americans who came north to Albany from the Southern states settled in Arbor Hill, an area that had been one of the first where their predecessors had settled in the city. (Note: This is reflected by another nearby National Register listing, the Stephen and Harriet Myers House, a station on the Underground Railroad outside the district on Livingston Avenue west of North Swan.) It came to be regarded as more desirable among newcomers than their other destination, the South End. Residents of that neighborhood often moved to Arbor Hill after they had made some money. African Americans displaced by the construction of what is now the State Department of Education Building in 1912 also resettled in Arbor Hill. As early as 1922 many of the city's prominent African-American institutions and organizations, such as churches and social clubs, were located in Arbor Hill. This growth led to the name being applied to the larger area it presently refers to, extending north to the railroad tracks, west to Northern Boulevard (now Henry Johnson Boulevard) and south to Sheridan Avenue.

In 1948 came the first suggestion that the neighborhood's future in the city lay with its own past. After a century of ownership, the descendants of James Olcott Worth formally transferred the Ten Broeck mansion from their family to the Albany County Historical Association. The ACHA began converting it into the historic house museum it is today; in 1971 it was listed on the National Register.

The challenges the neighborhood faced in maintaining its historic properties were demonstrated later, in the 1960s. By that time the neighborhood, overwhelmingly African American, was considered one of the worst in Albany. Sweet Pilgrim's distinctive spire was removed, leaving St. Joseph's as the only church in the district with a presence in the city's skyline. Later in the decade, urban renewal efforts began to target Arbor Hill. The houses north of Livingston Avenue were demolished and replaced with the modern affordable housing that is there now. Similar projects targeted the blocks west of North Swan, leaving gaps and modern intrusions that also persist today.

=== 1975–present: Preservation and revitalization efforts ===
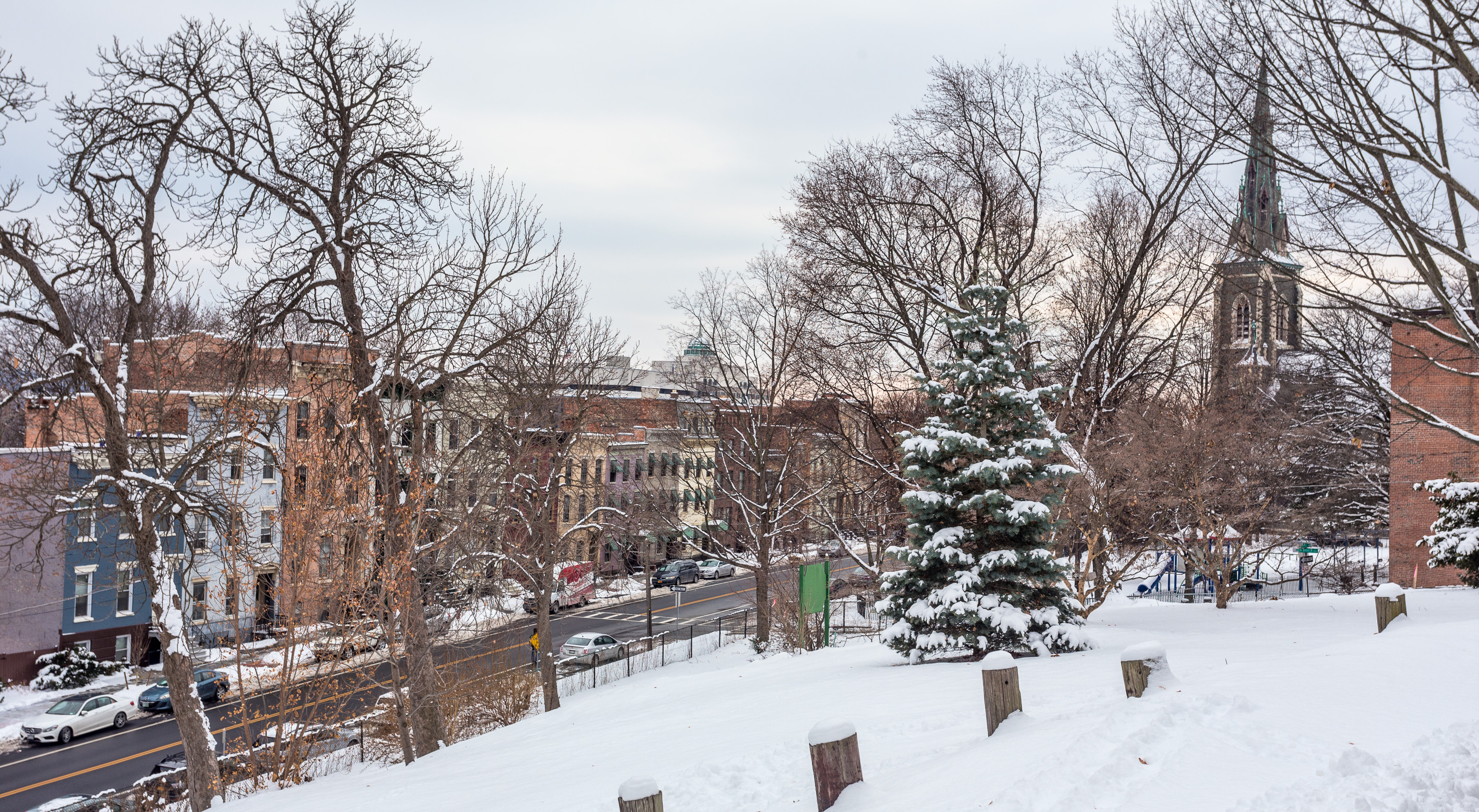
Looking down at Ten Broeck Street and St. Joseph Church covered in snow, 2018

In 1975 several residents of the Ten Broeck Triangle formed the Arbor Hill Concerned Citizens Association (AHCCA) to lobby the city for improvements in neighborhood services. Many of them lived in the surviving townhouses, which they had often restored themselves. They saw gentrification as the key to revitalizing the neighborhood, due to its proximity to downtown Albany and the growing service-sector jobs there. To further this goal, they worked with preservationists to have the triangle recognized as a historic district. That 13-acre (5.3 ha) area was duly listed on the Register in 1979 as the Ten Broeck Historic District.

The city's urban renewal agency helped to repopulate the area with three auctions of foreclosed houses on Ten Broeck Street during that period. Starting prices were between $5–10,000; winning bidders received a $70,000 grant and a $80,000 loan at 3 percent interest. Priority went to former residents of Arbor Hill, families, and those who demonstrated an eagerness to participate in the community. All had to have a sufficient credit history to justify the loan. The AHCCA assisted the city in identifying bidders who met those qualifications. While only half the houses sold under the program were actually rehabilitated, the program was considered a success.

Continuing historic surveys and inventories of the area found that the blocks between the Ten Broeck Triangle and North Swan also had many intact rowhouses from the same 19th century period with little modern intrusion, even if some of them were in a state of neglect and disrepair. That area also extended to St. Joseph's School, part of the church's complex. Accordingly, in 1984, the district was extended by 21 acres (8.5 ha) to its present size of 34 acres (14 ha). In addition to almost tripling its area, it more than doubled the amount of contributing properties to 220. The expanded district was renamed to reflect the area's wider scope and historic naming.

St. Joseph's particularly struggled in the late 20th century. After being among the many historic locations in Albany used by the producers of the 1987 film Ironweed to recreate the city's appearance during the Great Depression, tight finances forced the Diocese of Albany to sell it to a congregant who in turn rented it back to them. That transaction did not prevent the church's outright closure in 1994; two years later the diocese bought it back and appointed a committee to seek alternative uses for it. By that point the church needed extensive repairs estimated to cost at least $2 million.

In 2000 St. Joseph's made the Historic Albany Foundation's list of "Seven to Save" in the city, and then the New York State Preservation League's similar list for the state two years later. A plan to rehabilitate it for use as a nightclub fell through, and when the building itself was on the verge of collapse in the winter of 2001 the city had to shore it up and take possession under eminent domain. It was in turn deeded to Historic Albany, which was able to secure matching funds for the necessary work which continued to stage cultural events there to raise all the money for a more complete restoration. Its plans for the adaptive reuse of the building failed to meet with community approval, and in 2013 Historic Albany returned it to the city. Residents of the Triangle continue to advocate for the church's restoration.

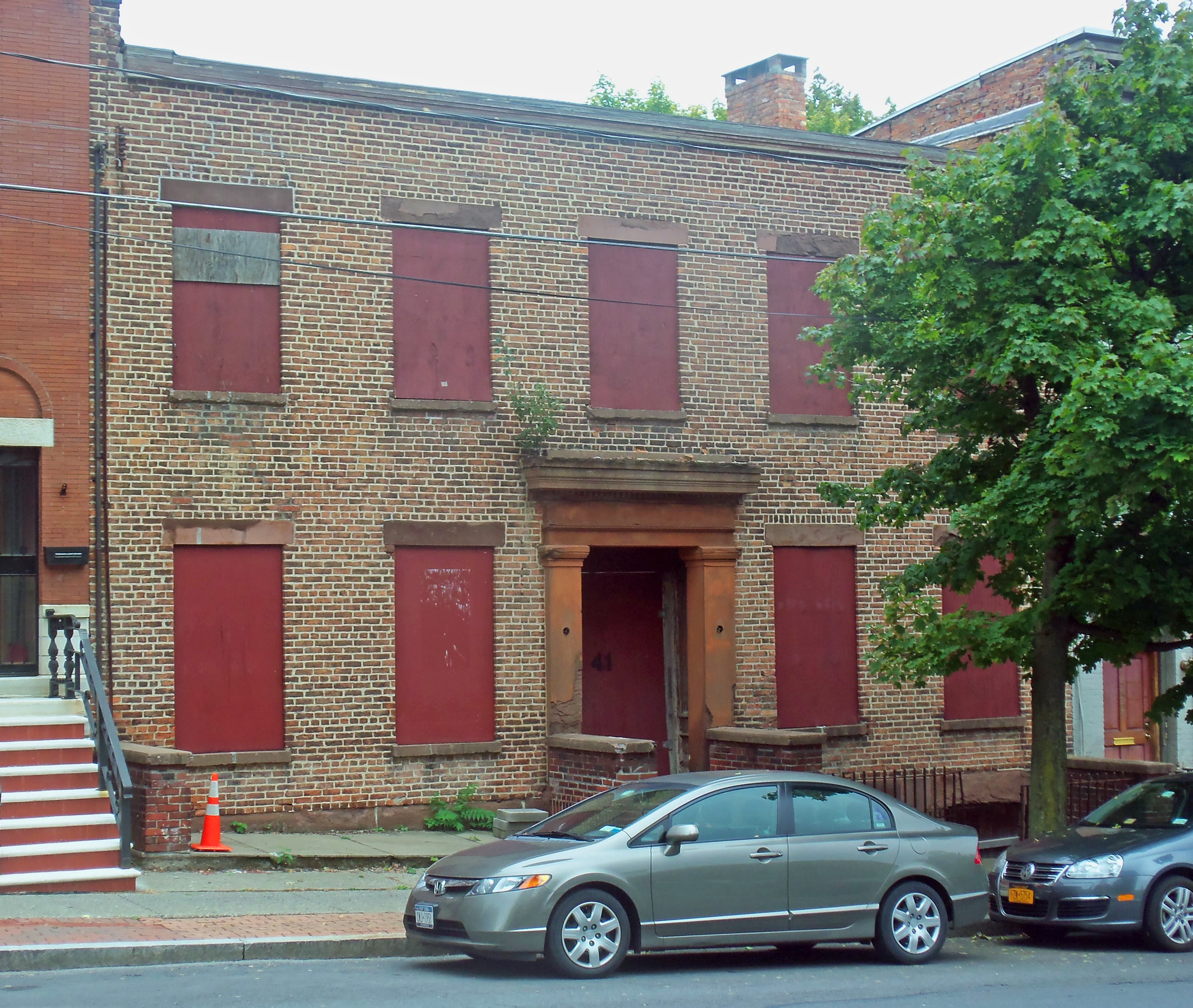
41 Ten Broeck Street, 2012

Historic Albany also helped partially preserve 41 Ten Broeck Street. In 2000, after ownership had reverted to Albany County following a foreclosure for unpaid property taxes, the county began to demolish the building. A court ordered the work stopped after finding that the county had not gained the proper approvals. It was eventually transferred to Historic Albany, which had brought the suit. Today only the facade remains, and Historic Albany is working to find a developer willing to restore it and rebuild the structure.

The AHCCA founded a separate group called the Arbor Hill Improvement Corporation in the early 1980s to address housing issues that the private developers of the area were not. It assists residents in applying for financing and restoration grants, sometimes partnering with similar organizations in other neighborhoods in applying for grants. Another community group, St. Joseph Housing Corporation, has renovated some old buildings into affordable housing.

By the 1990s the Ten Broeck Triangle had been almost completely restored and was home to a thriving community of young professionals and their families. However, the rest of the district, like the rest of Arbor Hill, had not been gentrified and continued to have the problems associated with poorer, predominantly minority urban neighborhoods. While there was tension between residents who continued to support those efforts and residents who felt the neighborhood should focus on improving lower-end housing, as the 20th century ended the latter efforts became more acceptable as it was clearer that gentrification could not spread beyond the triangle.

In 2002 local artist Yacob Williams painted the first of four murals in the Arbor Hill neighborhood on the house at the corner of North Swan and Livingston, a project intended to improve the quality of life in a high-crime area. He chose the design, "Mother Africa", from suggestions submitted by local youth, who also assisted on the painting. The project was cosponsored by the Ten Broeck Triangle Preservation League and the Social Capital Development Corporation.

During the 2010s, St. Joseph's Academy was renovated into the Albany Barn, a 13,500-square-foot (1,250 m^{2}) space for 22 artists to live and work. In 2018 Albany mayor Kathy Sheehan and her husband bought 18 First Street for $77,000. "I've been talking about preserving these buildings, moving downtown," she said. "I need to walk the walk." Restoring the house turned out to be more extensive than they expected, requiring replacing a side wall, the roof, the entire plumbing and electrical systems, and gutting the interior. "It stopped being much of a historic preservation because we couldn't preserve anything", she said. The couple moved in late in 2019.

== Significant contributing properties ==
All but three of the 220 buildings in the district are contributing properties to its historic character. Almost all of those 217 are houses. One, the Ten Broeck Mansion, is individually listed on the Register as well. Some others have distinctive characteristics within the district.

=== Houses ===
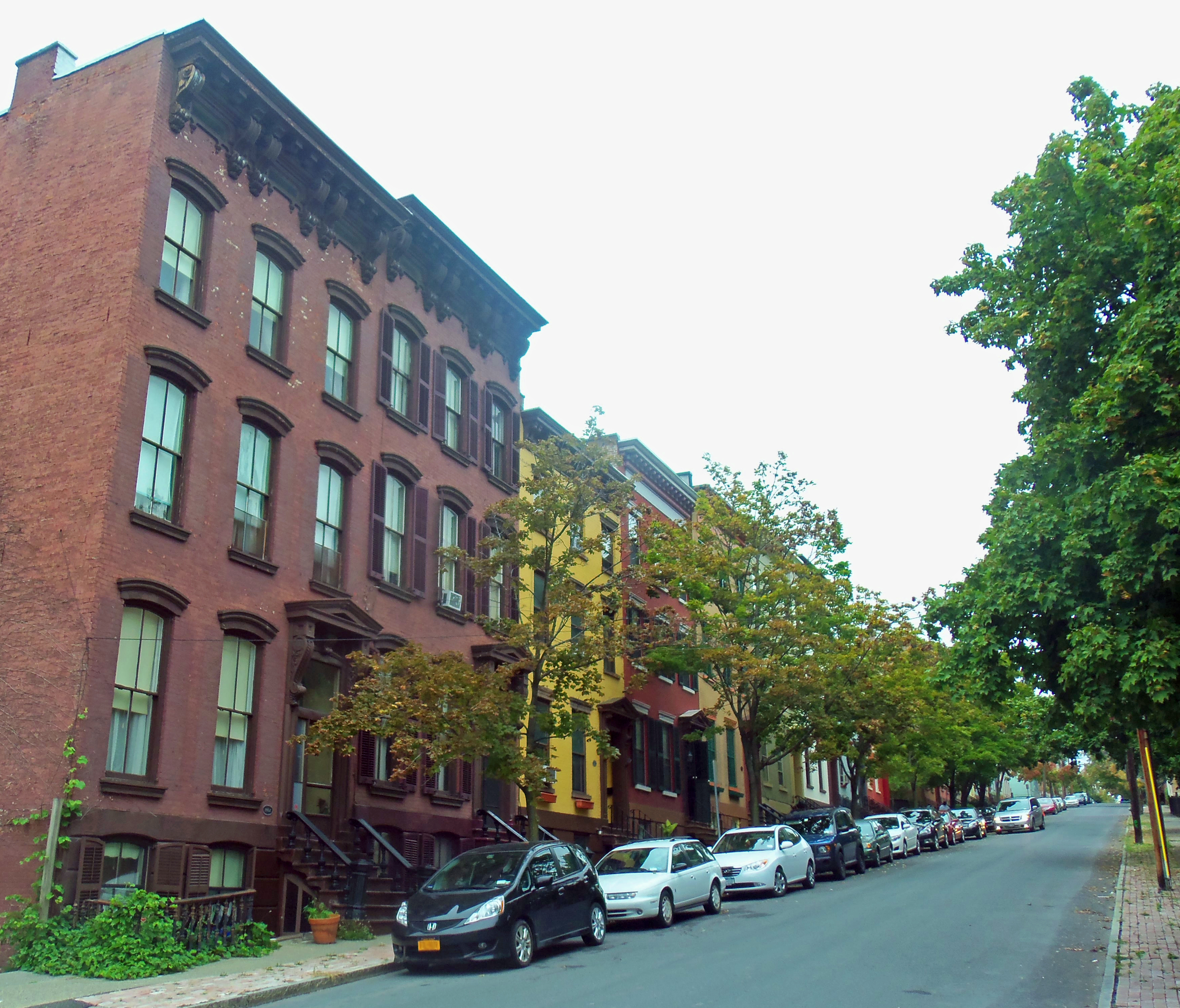
First Street

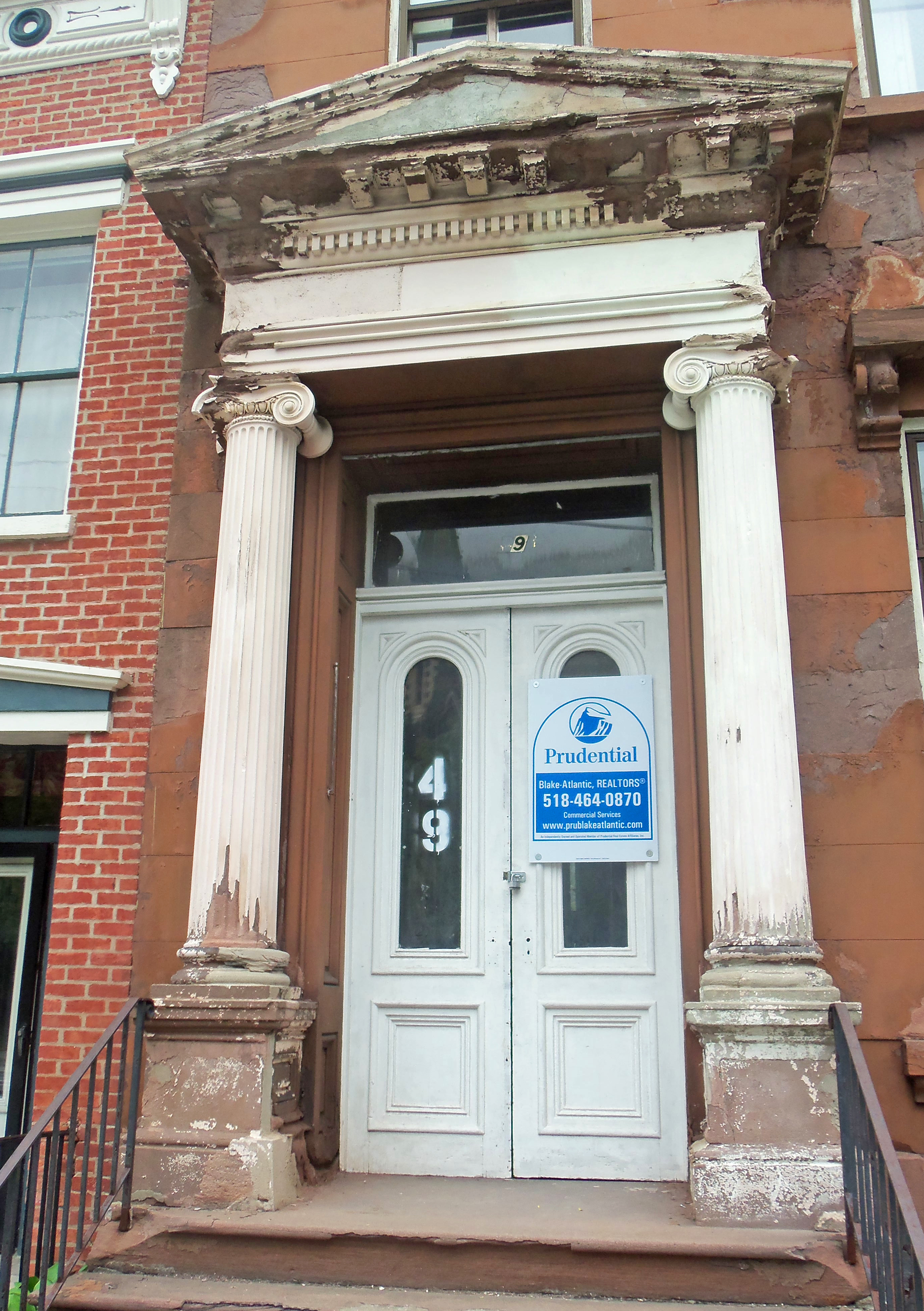
Entrance to 49 Ten Broeck St.

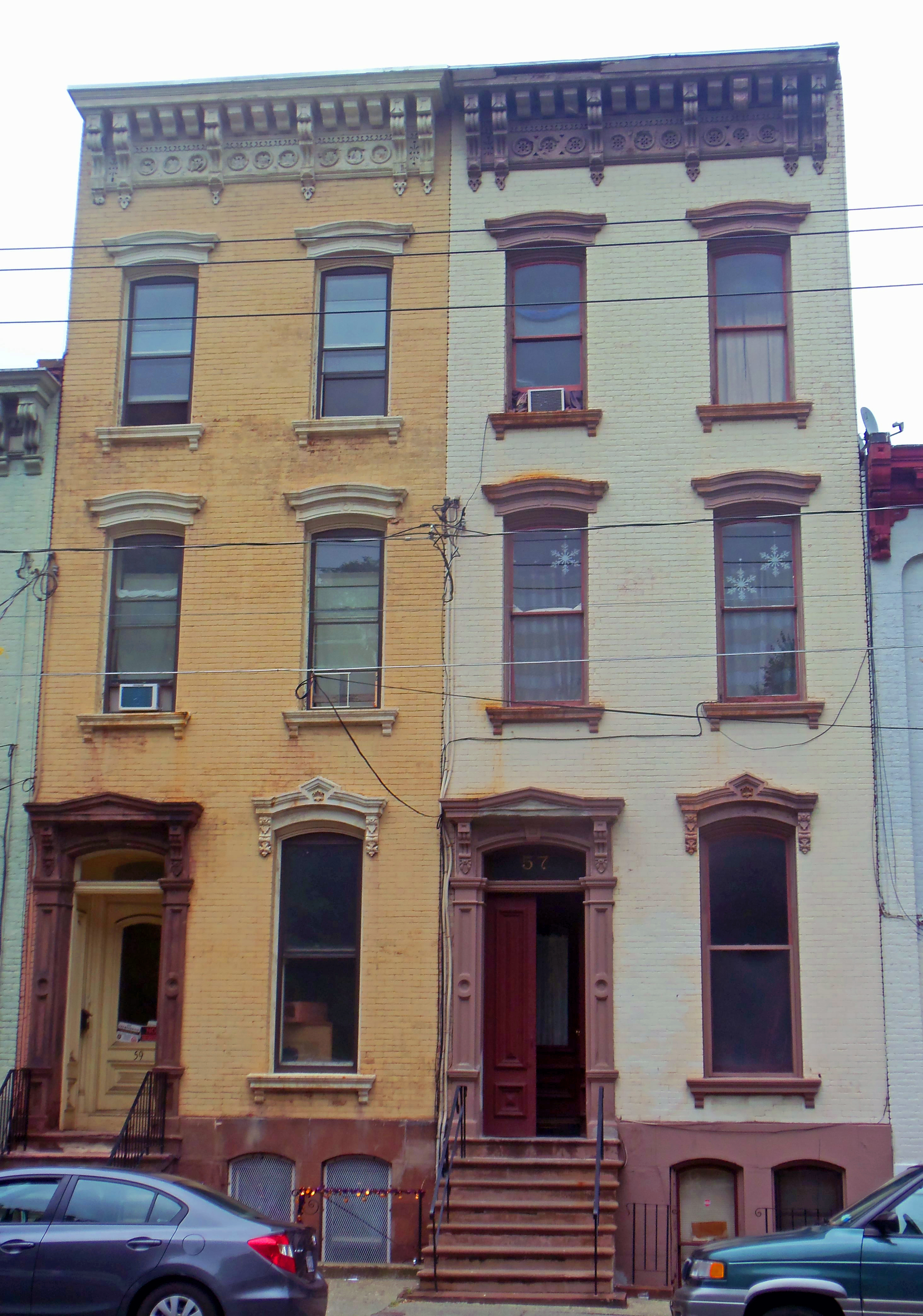
57-59 Ten Broeck St.

- 2–38 First Street. This group of three-bay, three-story rowhouses, descending in steps along with its street, has been described as "one of the most aesthetically pleasing mid-19th century townscapes in Albany." Many have brownstone pedimented doorways. All were built in the late 1850s and early 1860s.
- 51 and 51 1/2 First Street: These two brick houses were built in 1885 in the Romanesque Revival style, unique on the street. They feature classically-inspired terra cotta decoration such as a pediment and frieze and a corbeled cornice. The house at 51 has stained glass in some windows.
- 55 and 57 First Street. These houses, 55 in wood and 57 in brick, predate 1846, making them among the earliest on the street. Both have a basic Greek Revival form with later Italianate detail such as a cornice and architraves. While the front facade of 55 First is now clad with aluminum siding, 57 is largely intact, with a pedimented door hood and eyebrow windows.
- 65 and 67 First Street: These are another pair of wooden houses. Built in the late 1880s, their unusual decoration for the neighborhood includes a pedimented and arched entry with pilasters and a porch with curved brackets and an unusual railing. Modern asbestos siding has covered up the facade at 65, but 67 retains the original clapboard, unusual window casings and an iron fence across the front yard.
- 69 and 71 First Street: These two brick houses, built at the same time as their neighbors, share the same unusual design touches. They include porches with bracket-like members between posts and corbelling supporting a decorative cornice on the facade.
- 2–6 Hall Place: This row of brick houses with wooden latticework two-story porches dates to 1859. The house at 4 Hall is four stories; 5 and 6 Hall have mansard roofs pierced by dormer windows that were added in 1874 when the Second Empire style was popular.
- 86–90 North Hawk Street: These three attached brick houses are among the district's few Gothic Revival style homes. All have wide door and window enclosures topped by Tudor-style moldings and prominent stone water tables. They date to the late 1850s.
- 36 North Swan Street: This brick Italianate three-story commercial-residential building has a bracketed wooden latticework cornice. Its two-over-two sash glazed windows have iron hoods and sills. The storefront is done in Carrarra glass. It was built in the late 1860s.
- 43 and 53 North Swan Street: These two wooden two-story structures are the oldest largely intact mixed-use commercial/residential buildings in the district, dating to 1845. Both have their original clapboard siding on the second floor and a bracketed cornice. The building at 43 North Swan has six-over-six double-hung sash and eyebrow windows as well.
- 50 North Swan Street: This two-story wooden commercial-residential building dates to 1844, making it the oldest on the street and one of the few buildings in the western section of the district predating the removal of the Van Rensselaer Cemetery. It has a bracketed cornice above the storefront; the upper story has been reclad with aluminum siding.
- 94 North Swan Street. Its facade long since covered in aluminum and permastone, this two-story wooden house from the late 1850s has a gable in the middle of its cornice, an unusual feature in the district.
- 12 and 14 Second Street: The two brick rowhouses here are typical of the Albany style of that building type. They have high exposed stone basements, stone stoops, tall windows, an iron hood on the door and an intricate bracketed cornice. They were built in the early 1870s.
- 20 Second Street: This two-story wooden house with a side gable is one of the few with that kind of roof in the district. A simple wood cornice is its only decorative touch; its facade is covered in aluminum. With its construction predating 1841, it is one of the earlier houses in the district.
- 23 and 25 Second Street: This pair of brick houses, built in the late 1840s, demonstrate the transition between the Greek Revival and Italianate styles. Their denticulated cornices, a hallmark of the former, are supported by the wooden brackets commonly associated with the latter. The houses are distinguished by a Gothic Revival railing around the areaway at 23 along with almost flush lintels and sills, in contrast to the door pediment and projecting sills of 25.
- 31 Second Street: Considered one of the best Greek Revival houses in the district, this wooden structure dates to the early 1840s. It has pilasters, flushboard siding, battered and shouldered window and door architraves and a cornice that suggests an entablature.
- 32 Second Street: Like the house across the street at 31 Second, this brick house exhibits less restraint in its Greek Revival stylings. Its decorative touches include columns in antis and a wood cornice. Its eyebrow windows have Greek key-patterned wooden screens. Its construction predates 1841.
- 44 Second Street: This two-story wooden house is one of the district's more idiosyncratic. Its one-over-one glazed windows are in a random arrangement; the second floor is splayed out in a bell curve. At the top is a bracketed cornice. It is believed, without certainty, to have been built in the 1840s.
- 53 Second Street: The only residential-commercial building in the district not on North Swan, this brick structure in Flemish bond has classic Greek Revival features such as flat lintels, barely projecting sills, a denticulated cornice and a simple frieze. It was built around 1844.
- 3 St. Joseph's Terrace: This one-story brick house is trimmed in marble and has a Spanish-style projecting pantile roof. Built in 1914, it is one of the last houses to be built during the district's period of significance.
- 4 and 5 St. Joseph's Terrace: These two Romanesque Revival two-story townhouses share similarities of form despite differing materials. Both have projecting semicircular second-story bays, arched doorways and segmental-arched first-story windows; however, 4 is yellow brick on a high brownstone foundation while 5 is made completely of rusticated brownstone. Much original decoration and finish remains on 4, including its original wooden doors, stained-glass transom in a first-floor window and dragon motif in the iron railing on the original steps. They were built in the mid-1890s.
- 10 Ten Broeck Place: This frame house clad in modern asbestos brick siding dates to the 1830s, making it the oldest surviving house in the district after the mansion. It has a Greek Revival entrance flanked by pilasters, shouldered trim on its six-by-six sash downstairs and eyebrow windows upstairs. Atop is a shallow hipped roof.
- 16 and 18 Ten Broeck Place: These two Italianate brick houses have prominent projecting sheet metal door and window hoods. At the roofline are bracketed cornices with porthole windows. They were built in the 1870s.
- 30 Ten Broeck Place: Another frame house predating the cemetery removal, this two-story building, now sided in aluminum, has six-over-six sash, Gothic Revival elements on its doorway and a bracketed cornice. Atop is a gabled roof. It is estimated to have been built about 1842.
- 41 Ten Broeck Street: This is a three-story, five-bay brick house with a brownstone Greek Revival entrance, stone lintels and a brick and wood cornice. Considered the first of the large mansion-style houses to be built on the street, it was built in 1845. Following an abortive demolition in 2000, only the facade remains.
- 43–45 Ten Broeck Street: These two rowhouses are two-story brick buildings trimmed in marble. They have asymmetric windows and arched doorways. Local architect William Lee Woollett, the first owner of record for 45, is believed to have designed and built them both around 1900.
- 49 Ten Broeck Street: This three-story brick house, built in 1859, has a prominent entrance portico with Ionic columns. It serves as the focal point for eastward views down Second Street.
- 51 Ten Broeck Street: This two-story brick house is the earliest dated house on the street, built in 1842 before the cemetery was moved. Its Italianate cornice was probably added later.
- 55 Ten Broeck Street: The two pilasters flanking the entrance of this two-story brick house are a feature common to other rowhouses of that era elsewhere in the city but not seen much otherwise in the Ten Broeck Triangle. They were built in the early 1860s.
- 57–59 Ten Broeck Street: These two late Italianate three-story rowhouses have unusual elongated proportions. Two brothers are believed to have built them around 1873.
- 93 Ten Broeck Street: This two-and-half-story brick Italianate house sits on a large lot for the neighborhood. It has intricate detailing, including bay windows, segmental arched lintels, ironwork and heavy brackets on the cornices. Side porches overlook what was once the garden on the south side. It is not known when, exactly, it was built.
- 105 Ten Broeck Street: This two-and-a-half-story brick house has a clipped corner, giving it an unusual polygonal shape fitting its location at the north end of the street. It is topped with an iron mansard roof, in keeping with its believed construction date of 1873.

=== Other buildings ===
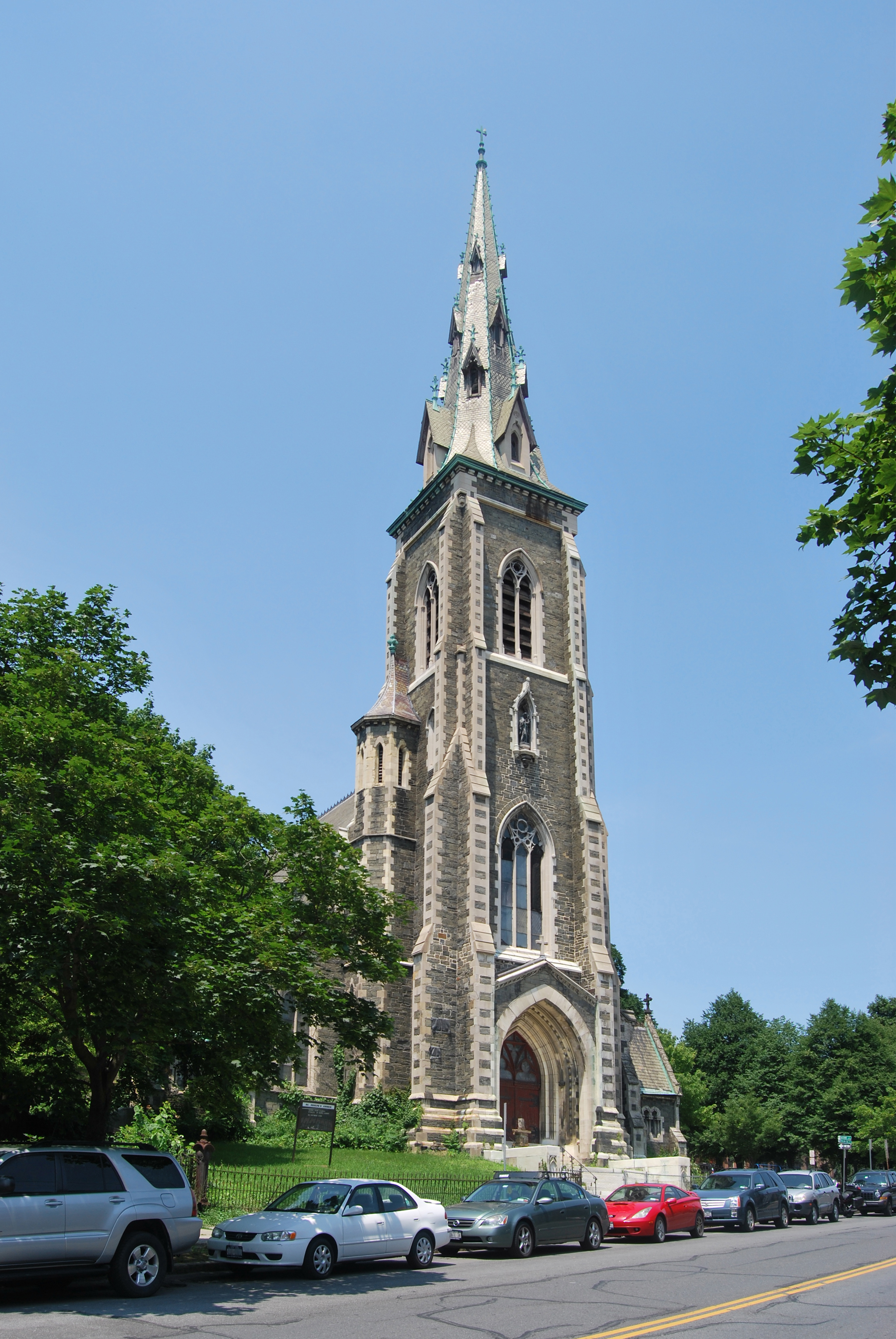
St. Joseph's Church

- King Building, 27–29 North Swan Street. This is a two-story brick Greek Revival duplex with six-over-six double-hung sash windows, flush lintels and near-flush sills, intricate cast iron door caps and a brick frieze. In the rear is an arch which was originally the rear entrance to the Ten Broeck Mansion. It dates to the 1850s.
- St. Joseph's Church, Ten Broeck Street. Irish American architect Patrick Keely designed this Gothic Revival church of bluestone with limestone trim for the growing Irish immigrant population in the northern neighborhoods of Albany. It was finished in 1860 and has served as the district's focal point ever since. The Roman Catholic Diocese of Albany stopped using it in 1994; since then there have been various efforts to restore it.
- St. Joseph's Church Rectory, 12 St. Joseph's Terrace. Built in 1892, this is a brick three-story Romanesque Revival house with stone lintels and string courses and an arched center door and basement window. It is topped with an asymmetrical gabled roof.
- St. Joseph's Academy, 70 North Swan Street. This four-story brick building, dating to 1905, has sections articulated by its fenestration and stair towers on its east (front) facade. Its parapet and water table are limestone; the windows on the fourth floor are arched with a brick course connecting them at the springline. It has been used as a youth center; following renovations in the 2010s, it is now the Albany Barn, which offers 22 living and work spaces for local artists.
- St. Joseph's Terrace Apartment Buildings, 7–8 and 9–10 St. Joseph's Terrace. These two brick buildings, constructed in 1914, are the only purpose-built apartments in the district. Both are brick and four bays wide, with 7–8 three stories tall and 9–10 four stories. The former is distinguished by its stone trim, including keystones, entrance surrounds and water tables. The latter has projecting bow windows on its upper stories.
- Sweet Pilgrim Baptist Church, 4 Ten Broeck Street. This brick church on a high limestone foundation dates to 1877. Its steeple was removed in the 1960s, but it remains an important aspect of the district as its southern gateway, at the Clinton Avenue intersection.

== Preservation ==
In 2003 two planning firms hired by the city sought citizen input and created the Arbor Hill Citizen Advisory Committee, which developed a plan to improve life in Arbor Hill as a whole. Among the aspects considered was how the historic district could benefit the neighborhood's future. The Ten Broeck Triangle, it noted, was one of three areas of Arbor Hill where property values did not suffer from the neighborhood's bad reputation. "It is not unusual to see an abandoned building next to a home in which a property owner has invested $300,000 or more," in the Triangle, the report said. "Clearly, to the extent that neighborhood-wide problems are alleviated or solved, property owners in the Ten Broeck neighborhood will greatly benefit and market values can be expected to escalate rapidly."

Projects suggested specifically for the district include promoting the adaptive reuse of larger properties like St. Joseph's School, a tree-lined pathway from North Swan to the Ten Broeck Mansion, and improving the sidewalks along North Swan. The reuse of St. Joseph's Church was also considered, with low-impact uses preferred. It was also suggested that Ten Broeck Street itself be made more pedestrian-friendly, either with wider sidewalks, trees on the sidewalks or a tree-lined center median. Participants in the meetings rejected a proposal for a new "signature building" at North Swan and Livingston because they thought the area was dense enough already.

In a 2005 progress report on the plan, the city noted that the state had awarded the Albany Housing Authority a grant for a feasibility study on the former St. Joseph's School. It also reported on Historic Albany's progress in stabilizing and restoring St. Joseph's, possibly for future use as a branch library. The organization had helped the plan's cultural goals as well by organizing a walking tour of the Ten Broeck Triangle. In 2010 the city and the advisory committee shared an award from the American Planning Association's (APA) upstate New York chapter for excellence in implementing the plan. Four years later the national APA recognized the entirety of Arbor Hill as one of its 10 great neighborhoods in America, along with Washington, D.C.'s Adams Morgan, Savannah, Georgia's Victorian District and Seattle's Fremont.

== See also ==
- National Register of Historic Places listings in Albany, New York
