= History of Albany, New York (1983–present) =

The history of Albany, New York from 1983 to present begins with the death of Erastus Corning 2nd, Albany's longest serving mayor. When Corning died in 1983, Thomas Whalen assumed the mayorship and was reelected twice. Albany saw a significant influx of federal dollars earmarked for restoring historic structures. What Corning had saved from destruction, Whalen refurbished. The Mayor's Office of Special Events was created in an effort to increase the number of festivals and artistic events in the city, including a year-long Dongan Charter tricentennial celebration in 1986. Whalen is credited for an "unparalleled cycle of commercial investment and development" in Albany due to his "aggressive business development programs".

Prior to the recession of the 1990s, Albany was home to two Fortune 500 companies: KeyBank and Fleet Bank; both have since moved or merged with other banks. Albany saw its political climate change after the death of Corning and the retirement of Congressman Sam Stratton. Long-term office holders became a thing of the past in the 1980s. Local media began following the drama surrounding county politics (specifically that of the newly created county executive position); the loss of Corning (and eventually the machine) led to a lack of interest in city politics. The 1990s brought about the surprise election of Gerald Jennings, who has been mayor since 1994. His tenure essentially ended the political machine that had been in place since the 1920s. During the 1990s, the State Legislature approved the $234 million "Albany Plan", "a building and renovation project [that] was the most ambitious building project to effect the area since the Rockefeller era." The Albany Plan saw the initiation of renovation and new building projects around the downtown area, and the move of many state workers from the Harriman State Office Campus to downtown. The late first decade of the 21st century saw a real possibility for a long-discussed and controversial Albany Convention Center; as of August 2010, the Albany Convention Center Authority had already purchased 75% of the land needed to build the downtown project.

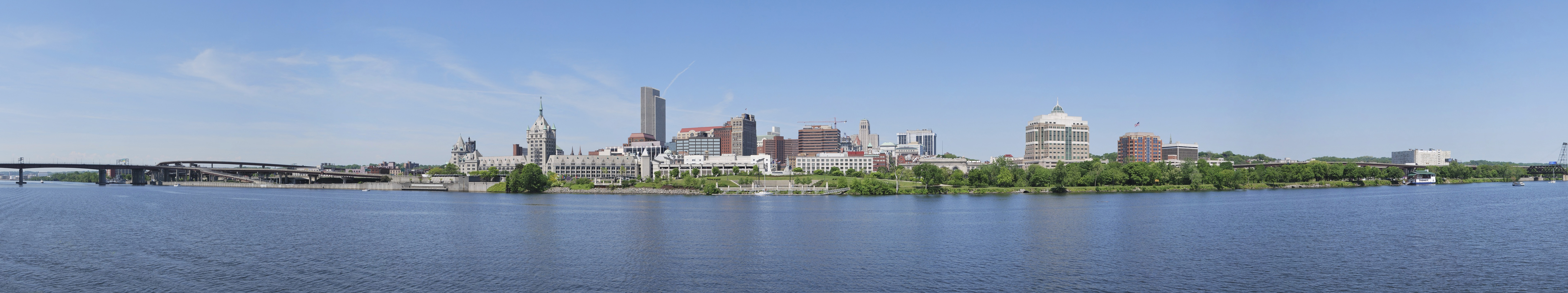
Panorama of Albany and the Hudson River from Rensselaer, looking northwest, in 2010

== Bibliography ==
- McEneny, John (2006). Albany, Capital City on the Hudson: An Illustrated History. Sun Valley, California: American Historical Press. ISBN 1-892724-53-7.
