= Ten Broeck Mansion =

Historic house in New York, United States

- U.S. National Register of Historic Places
- U.S. Historic district – Contributing property
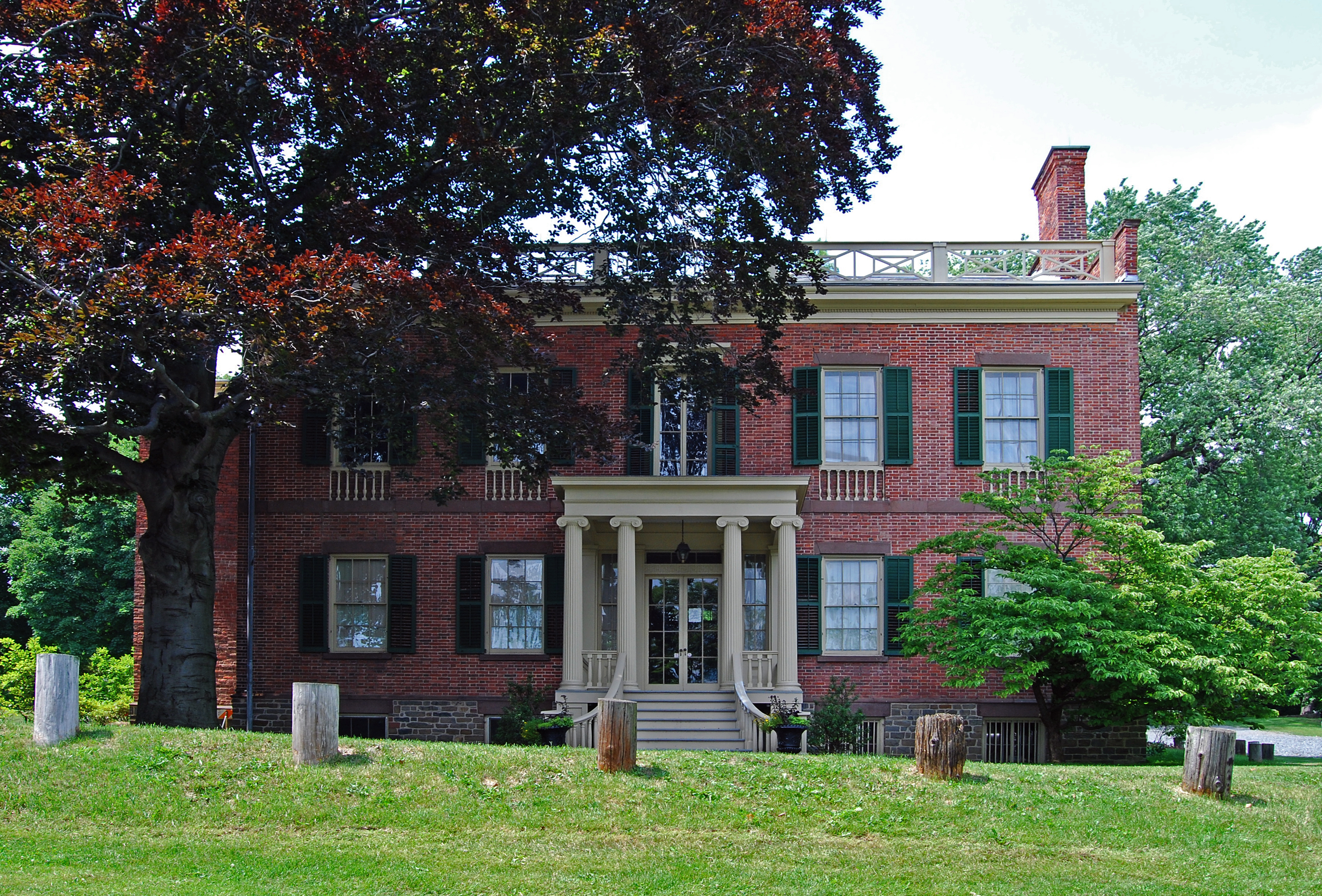
- Front elevation, 2009

- Location within New York Location within the United States
- Interactive map showing the location of Ten Broeck House
- Location: Albany, NY
- Coordinates: 42°39′31″N 73°45′6″W
- Built: 1797
- Website: Ten Broeck Mansion
- Part of: Arbor Hill Historic District–Ten Broeck Triangle
- NRHP reference No.: 71000522
- Added to NRHP: August 12, 1971

The Ten Broeck Mansion in Albany, New York was built in 1797. It was listed on the National Register of Historic Places in 1971. A decade later it was included as a contributing property to the Arbor Hill Historic District–Ten Broeck Triangle when that neighborhood was listed on the Register.

== History ==
Ten Broeck Mansion was built in 1797 by Elizabeth (Van Rensselaer) Ten Broeck and her husband Abraham Ten Broeck on land leased from her brother, the patroon Stephen Van Rensselaer. At the time the land was in the town of Watervliet north of the city of Albany. Originally built in the Federal-style, the mansion was called "Prospect".

Abraham Ten Broeck enjoyed Prospect for only 12 years before his death in 1810. His widow, Elizabeth, lived there another three years until her death.

Over the next thirty years, the Mansion was renovated in the Greek-revival style. In 1848 Thomas Worth Olcott purchased the residence and renamed it Arbor Hill (Arbour Hill), along with adding a first-floor butler's pantry and the second-floor bathrooms, both of which reflect the Victorian style of the late 19th Century. The house has been owned by the Albany County Historical Association since it was purchased from the Olcott family in 1948.

The house is open as a historic house museum with decorations and furnishings from the mid-19th century.

== Gallery ==
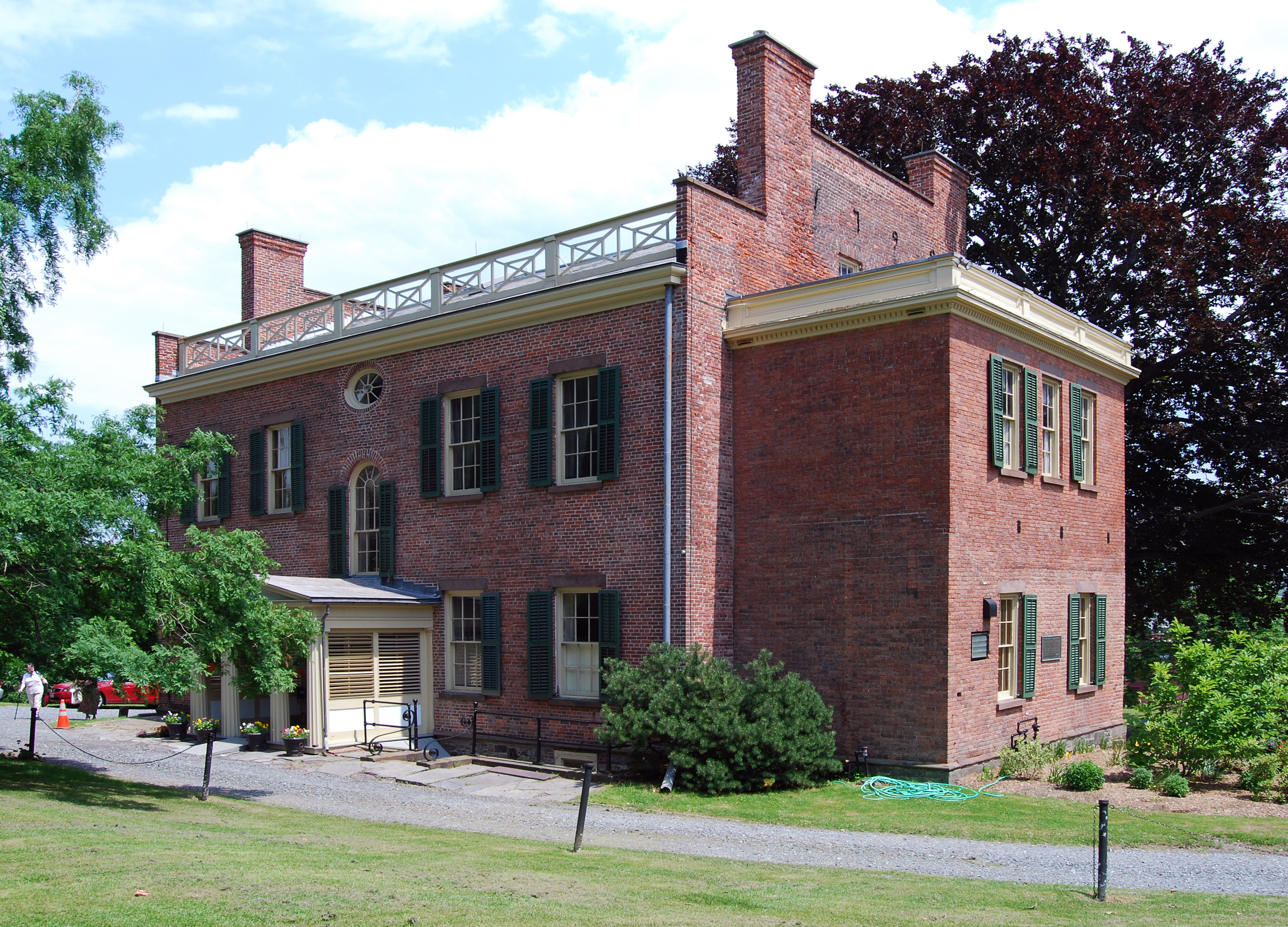
Rear elevation of the mansion

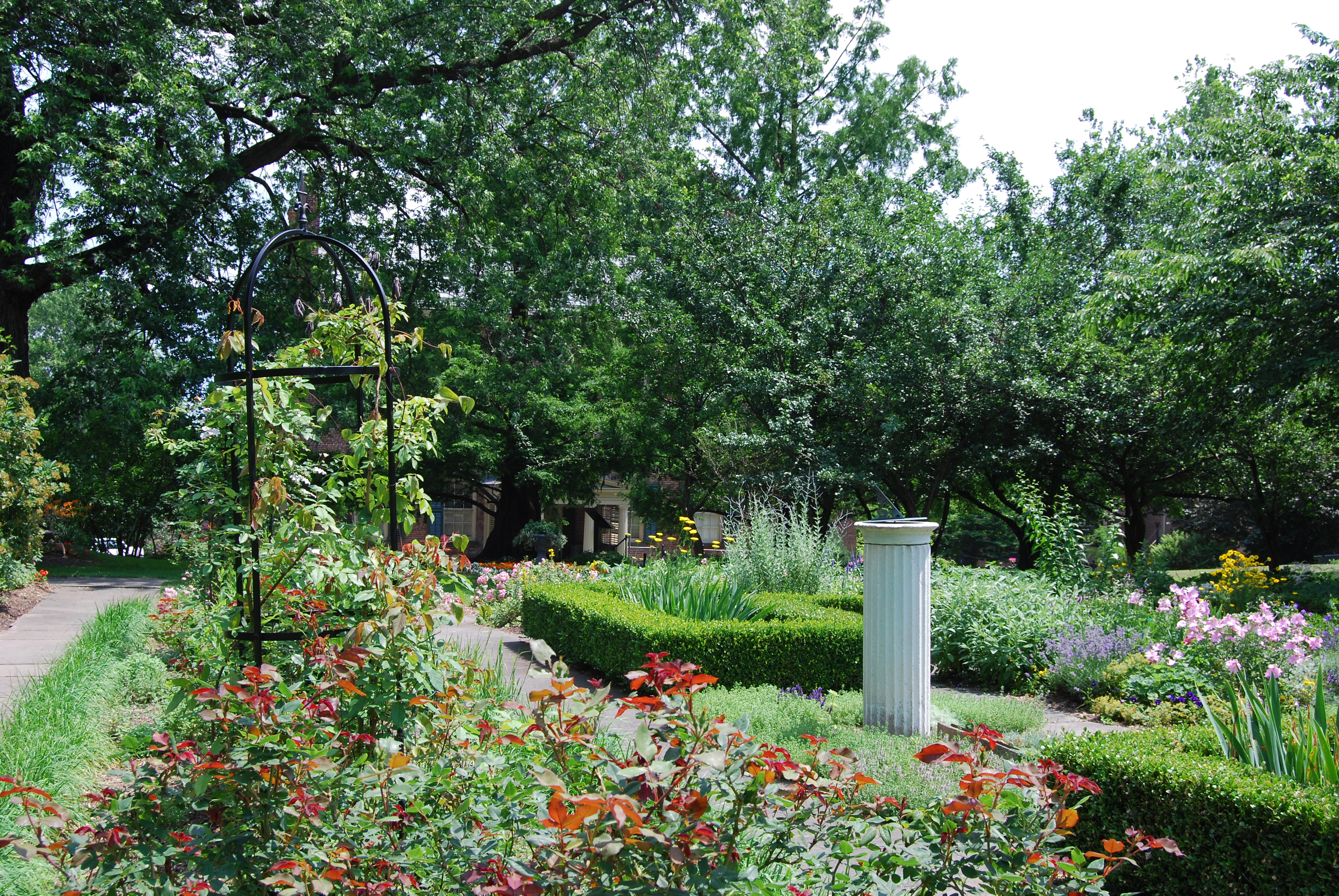
Mansion garden

== See also ==
- History of Albany, New York
- National Register of Historic Places listings in Albany, New York
- Schuyler Mansion
