= South End Historic District =

South End Historic District may refer to:

- South End District, Boston, Massachusetts, a historic district listed on the National Register of Historic Places (NRHP)
- South End Historic District (Bristol, Connecticut), listed on the NRHP in Hartford County, Connecticut
- South End Historic District (Stamford, Connecticut), listed on the NRHP in Fairfield County, Connecticut
- South End-Groesbeckville Historic District, Albany, New York, listed on the NRHP in New York
