= Groesbeckville, Albany, New York =

Groesbeckville City of Albany
- Neighborhood
- Etymology: named for Groesbeck family
- Country: United States
- State: New York
- County: Albany County
- City: Albany
- Settled: 1820s
- Time zone: UTC-5 (Eastern Standard Time)
  - Summer (DST): UTC-4 (Eastern Daylight Time)

- South End-Groesbeckville Historic District
- U.S. National Register of Historic Places
- U.S. Historic district
- Location: Albany, New York
- Architect: Multiple
- Architectural style: Italianate, Stick/Eastlake, Greek Revival
- NRHP reference No.: 84002062
- Added to NRHP: 1984

Groesbeckville is a former hamlet that was located in the town of Bethlehem outside the city limits of Albany, New York. The hamlet was named for a prominent Albany family, the Groesbecks. Groesbeckville was annexed by the City of Albany in 1870 and became a part of Albany's South End neighborhood. The area that was formerly known as Groesbeckville became a part of the South End-Groesbeckville Historic District.

== History ==
General Philip Schuyler built the Schuyler Mansion around 1761 overlooking the pastureland of the Dutch Church. After Schuyler's death in 1804, his property was subdivided, with streets laid out and lots sold. Buildings sprang up along South Pearl Street starting in the 1820s and 1830s; other streets in Groesbeckville saw construction in the decades following. In the 1855 New York state census, Groesbeckville had a population of 1,232.

During the 1860s, the residents of the hamlet began to agitate for annexation to the City of Albany. In 1870, the hamlet was finally annexed when the Albany border was extended a mile south; Groesbeckville then became Albany's First Ward. The area formerly known as Groesbeckville became heavily settled by Germans and Irish in the late 19th century. In 1873, a mission was established there to serve the Catholic German population; in 1880 that mission became Our Lady Help of Christians Church (locally called "Maria Hilf"--"Mary Help" in German).

== Architecture ==
The architecture of buildings in Groesbeckville tends to be modest in design, reflecting the working-class conditions of the 19th-century German and Irish immigrants who resided there. Much of the area's construction was owner-financed, resulting in a variety of styles and construction materials. The most distinctive styles are local variations of Greek Revival and Italianate architecture.

== See also ==
- Neighborhoods of Albany, New York
- History of Albany, New York
