= A. Mendelson and Son Company Building =

Historic place in New York, United States

- U.S. National Register of Historic Places
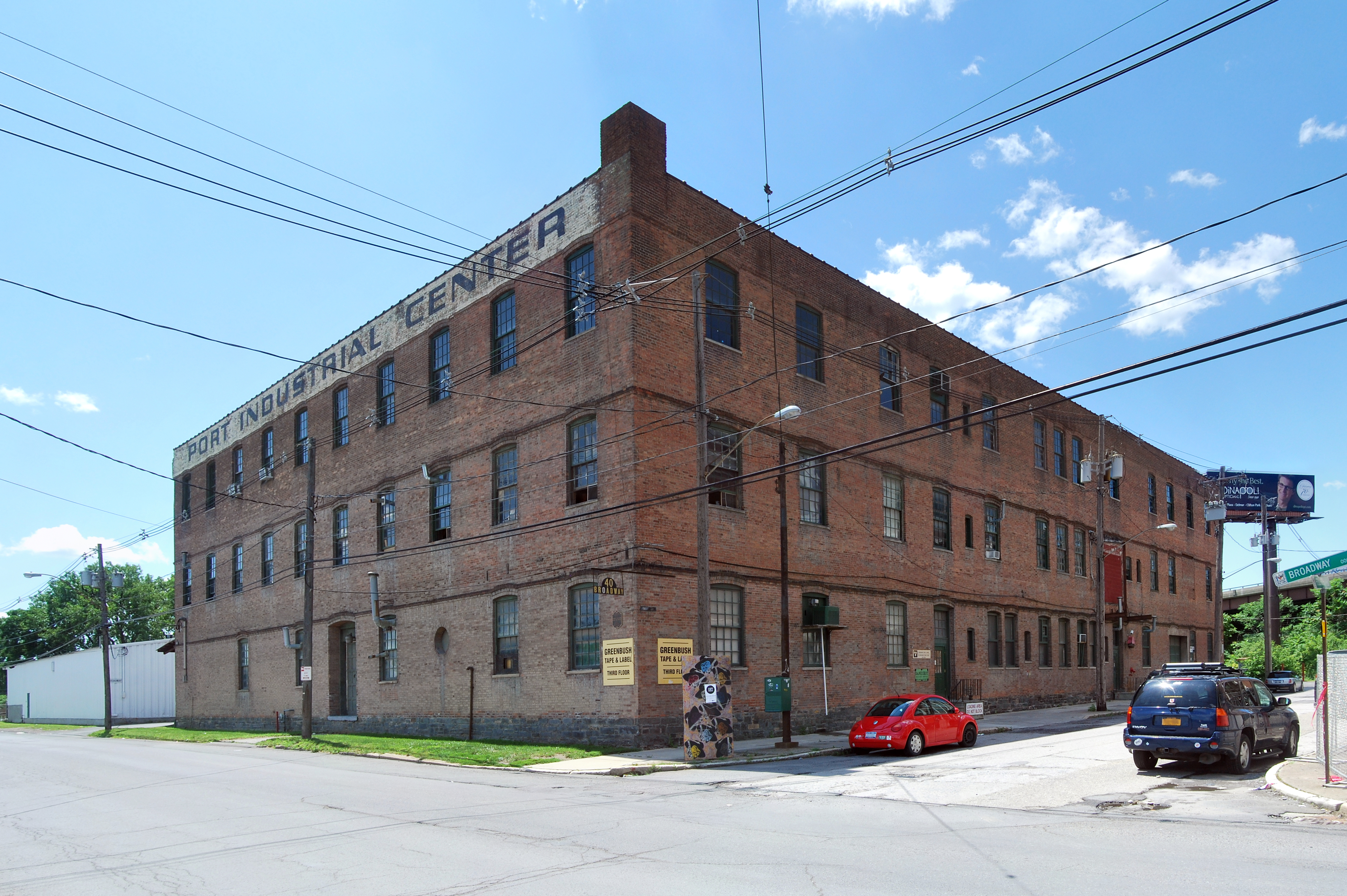
- East elevation and north profile, 2011

- Location within New York Location within the United States
- Location: Albany, NY
- Coordinates: 42°38′16″N 73°45′16″W
- Area: 0.87 acres (0.35 ha)
- Built: 1905–09
- NRHP reference No.: 03000021
- Added to NRHP: June 6, 2003

The A. Mendelson and Son Company Building is located on Broadway in Albany, New York, United States. It is a brick industrial building erected in the early 20th century. In 2003 it was listed on the National Register of Historic Places. It is one of the few intact examples of the early 20th century industrial architecture of Albany.

Originally built to replace an earlier building damaged by fire in 1904, it was used to manufacture lye and potash. It is one of the few remaining industrial buildings from that period on Albany's waterfront, making a distinct contrast to an adjacent building erected just a decade later. Several subsequent owners have left it largely intact, and it remains in industrial use, home for the past four decades to a tape and label manufacturer, as well as some other small businesses.

== Building ==
The Mendelson Building occupies most of the block on the west side of Broadway between Fourth Avenue and Vine Street. To the east, between Broadway and the Hudson River, are parking lots, vacant land and another large building. Two other industrial buildings, of a similar size and shape but not as old, are to the north. A modern warehouse is on the south. On the west are railroad tracks used by CSX and the elevated roadways of Interstate 787, dividing the waterfront from the residential neighborhoods of the South End.

The building itself is a three-story 10-by-13-bay brick structure on a foundation of cut bluestone and topped by a flat roof. The facade bricks are laid in common bond. Most windows are 12-over-12 light wood double-hung sash windows with mild segmental-arched lintels. Smaller, narrower windows are interspersed between them at irregular intervals, most significantly on all three stories between the fourth and fifth bays from the east on the north side. A small round window is on the third bay south on the east side.

A belt course connects the window lintels. These are the building's only decoration besides "Port Business Center" painted in large black letters on a yellow background just below the eastern roofline. The bricks rise several feet above the roofline to form a parapet capped with terra cotta barrel tiles. At the southwest corner the roof is pierced by the elevator's motor housing, and a small chimney rises from the northeast.

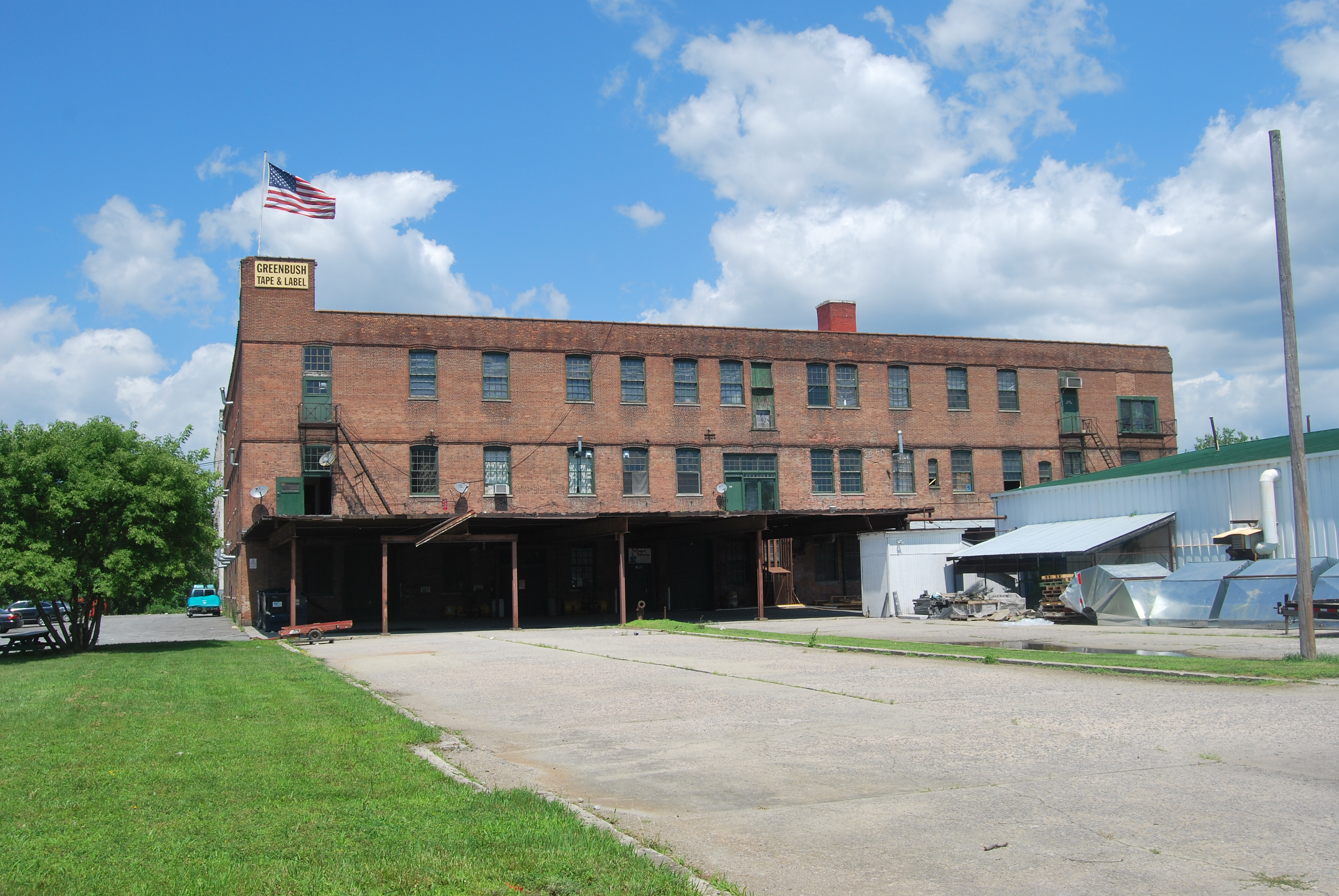
South elevation

In the fourth bay west from Broadway along the north side is the building's main business entrance. A small set of steps leads up to a heavy wooden door with transom. A similar secondary entrance is in the fourth bay from the east façade, just west of a large loading door similar to that in the middle of the east facade. Along the south is a large metal canopy, and another loading door is in the center. The west of the building has loading doors on the first and second floors.

Inside, the floor layout reflects both the temporary nature of industrial space and the cage structural system. The building's structural load is carried by the steel beams and iron columns inside. The exterior walls are self-supporting; corbeled pilasters on their interiors support the beams, and the iron columns are within the masonry of the building's two interior north-south firewalls. Secondary support is provided by eight-inch–thick (20 cm) iron columns throughout.

The first floor is concrete. On the upper two stories, 14-by-8-inch (36 by 20 cm) timber joists rest across the steel beams, supporting wood planking several inches thick. This is covered by steel plate in many areas to make moving barrels around easier. The firewalls have two entries with relieving arches and iron sliding doors on tracks. The elevator in the southwest corner is the original traction elevator, with its motor on top to free up space on the first floor. Most partitions within the firewalled areas are made of materials that can easily be removed without seriously damaging the building.

== History ==
The Erie Canal and the development of railroads made Albany a bustling inland port by the late 19th century. Industry in the city found the area around the port an ideal business location, and by the end of the century there were 16 such buildings along Broadway similar to the Mendelson building, with the river and port facilities on one side and the Delaware and Hudson Railroad on the other. The site at 40 Broadway is first known to have been used by the John A. Goewey Company, which built a five-story brick building to make holloware, in particular ham boilers and tea kettles. The complex included a foundry and shops on the west side.

In 1882 A. Winterburn started the Capital City Malleable Iron Company in the building, primarily making agricultural implements and carriage irons. The interior was used for both pattern shops and offices. Thirteen years later, in 1895, it was transferred to the A. Mendelson and Son Company, makers of lye and potash.

A 1904 fire destroyed the upper two floors and, along with the water used to extinguish the fire, severely damaged the lower stories. The Times Union, Albany's major daily newspaper then as now, reported that 150 people had been left jobless and a considerable amount of inventory destroyed. The owners promised the building would be rebuilt as soon as possible.

It has not been determined exactly when the current building was constructed. Albany did not start issuing building permits until 1909, and there are none for 40 Broadway. Based on the owners' promise, it has been assumed that the site was cleared and the current, smaller building was in place around 1905 at the earliest, and definitely before 1909. It is possible that some elements of the original building's foundation were reused in the current building.

Aesthetically, the current building is typical of factories from the turn-of-the-century period. Brick is used extensively both inside and out, with minimal decoration. The large windows allowed natural light into interior spaces that were difficult to light fully with electricity. Elevators were also standard for the time in new industrial construction. A new feature in the building resulting from the destruction of the old was an automatic fire sprinkler system.

In 1909, Mendelson bought the building that existed at that time to its north, which had been a grain wholesaler and distributor. A bridge was built over Fourth Avenue to connect them. Seven years later, in 1916, the company demolished that building and replaced it with the current building. While similar in size and form to its neighbor, the newer building showed a distinct change had taken place in industrial aesthetics from the era in which 40 Broadway had been constructed. It used steel framing and was faced in concrete, with rows of small steel sash windows letting in light rather than the larger wooden ones.

Mendelson sold both buildings in 1919 to the B.T. Babbitt Company, another lye maker, which had been doing business since the 1830s. Babbitt expanded its product line to include soaps and soap powders, but made no changes to the building itself. They in turn sold the buildings in 1965.

In 1969, 40 Broadway was purchased by Greenbush Tape & Label; the family-owned business moved there, where it has been ever since. At some point before that, the steel canopy had been added over the shipping and receiving area on the south facade. Greenbush removed the bridges to the 1916 building and added a glass door on the second floor of the south facade to allow access to the canopy. In 2000 it replaced the roof. It has worked hard to preserve the building's architectural integrity. Other businesses in the building include an art gallery, recently restored after a 2009 fire, and an antique pool table dealership.

== See also ==
- National Register of Historic Places listings in Albany, New York
