= South End Historic District (Bristol, Connecticut) =

Historic district in Connecticut, United States

- U.S. National Register of Historic Places
- U.S. Historic district
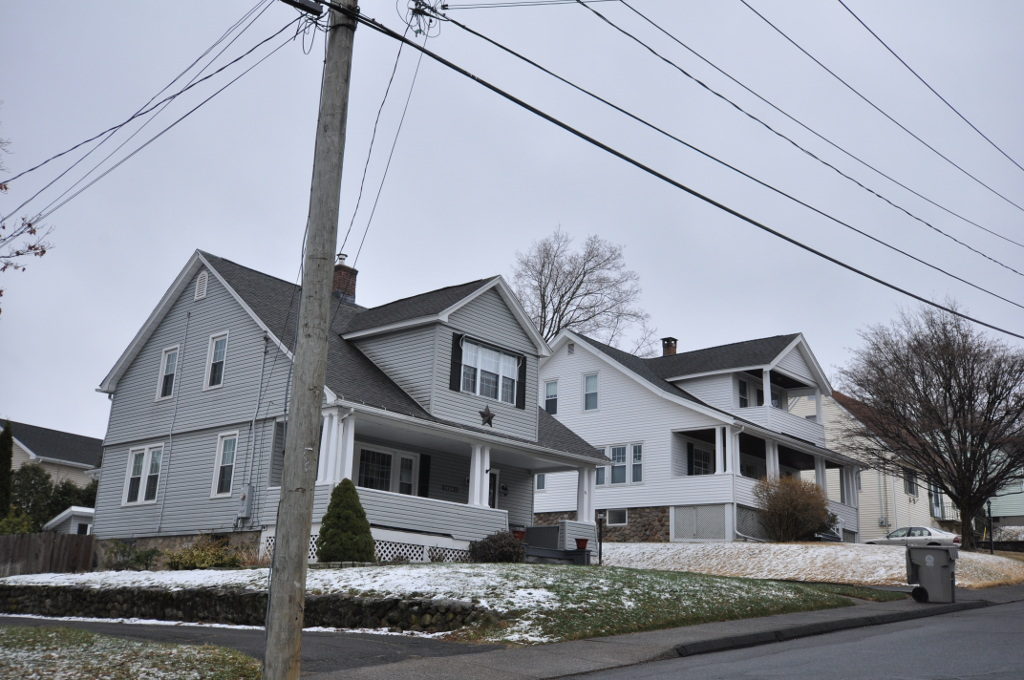

- Location within Connecticut Location within the United States
- Location: Roughly bounded East Road., Willis Street, George Street, and South Street, Bristol, Connecticut
- Coordinates: 41°39′55″N 72°56′33″W
- Area: 40 acres (16 ha)
- Architect: Lockwood, B.R.; et.al.
- Architectural style: Colonial Revival, Bungalow/craftsman, et.al.
- NRHP reference No.: 00001625
- Added to NRHP: January 19, 2001

The South End Historic District encompasses one of the oldest residential areas of Bristol, Connecticut. Extending south from South Street along George and Hull Streets, this area's growth as a residential area's mirror's the city's growth as an industrial center from the second quarter of the 19th century, and includes a well-preserved diversity of residential architecture to the mid-20th century. It was listed on the National Register of Historic Places in 2001.

== Description and history ==
Bristol's 19th-century industrial growth was begun with the introduction of clock-making as a business in 1821, with the arrival of Chauncey Jerome. Jerome's factory, located on the Pequabuck River, grew rapidly, and was the nation's largest maker of clocks by 1850. Jerome built a fine Greek Revival house in 1832 at the corner of Main and South Streets that is still a prominent landmark, and one of the oldest buildings in this historic district; it now houses the local Elks lodge. Other manufacturers and businessmen also built their homes on South Street, and more middle-class housing began to be developed behind that row of houses on George and Hull Streets. By the end of the 19th century, the city's elites had largely moved to the north side of downtown (the Federal Hill area), and this neighborhood was largely built out with more dense middle and lower-class housing in the first decades of the 20th century. Only a few buildings post-date World War II.

The historic district is bounded on the north by the south side of South Street, roughly between George and Willis Streets. It extends south along George and Hull Streets to Murray Road, extending eastward along Sigourney Street and including spur and cross streets. In an area of 40 acres (16 ha) there are more than 100 historically significant buildings, most of wood frame construction. Stylistically they are diverse, reflecting the evolution of the area over more than 100 years of development. Houses on South and Hull Streets generally date to the 19th century, while those on Hull and other streets were typically built in the 1910s and 1920s. A number of the older originally single-family houses have been converted to multiple apartments, and there are a number of two and three-family buildings.

== See also ==
- National Register of Historic Places listings in Hartford County, Connecticut
