= Beleden House =

Historic house in Connecticut, United States

- U.S. National Register of Historic Places
- U.S. Historic district – Contributing property
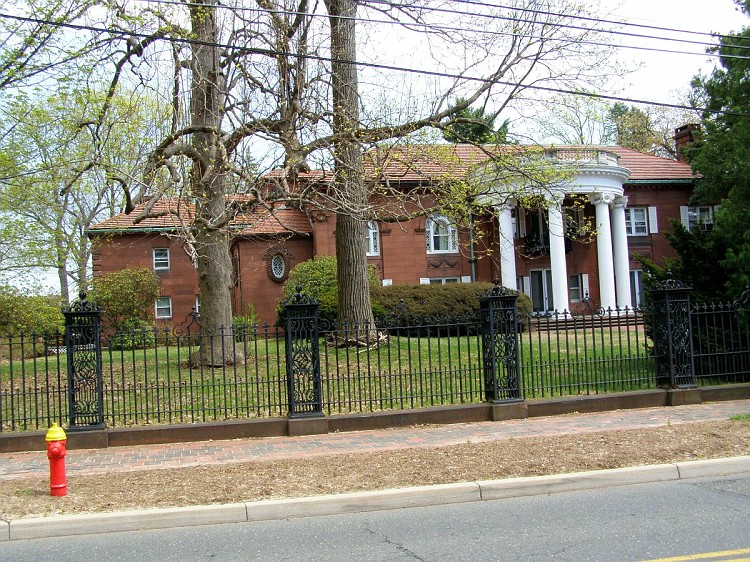

- Location within Connecticut Location within the United States
- Location: 50 Bellevue Avenue, Bristol, Connecticut
- Coordinates: 41°40′31″N 72°56′25″W
- Area: 1.7 acres (0.69 ha)
- Built: 1908
- Architect: Brown, Samuel J.
- Architectural style: Beaux Arts
- Part of: Federal Hill Historic District (ID86001989)
- NRHP reference No.: 82004392

Significant dates
- Added to NRHP: March 15, 1982
- Designated CP: August 28, 1986

Beleden House is a historic house at 50 Bellevue Avenue in Bristol, Connecticut. Built in 1908–10, it is a prominent and rare example of a high-quality residence in the Beaux Arts style. It was listed on the National Register of Historic Places in 1982.

== Description and history ==
Beleden House is located in Bristol's Federal Hill neighborhood, one of its most fashionable addresses in the early 20th century. It stands on the east side of Bellevue Avenue, between Session Street and Beleden Gardens Drive. It is a two-story masonry structure, built out of orange brick and covered by a hip roof. It has a U-shaped plan, with a service wing extending north from the northern leg of the U. The front facade is dominated by a two-story half-round four-column Ionic portico. The building corners are finished in brick pilasters that echo those of the portico. The interior of the U is a palm court, whose eastern bound is an arched colonnade. The interior of the house is lavishly appointed with fine woodwork and multiple types and colors of imported marble, and includes a music room with organ.

The house was built in 1908-10 for William Sessions, a local merchant and banker. It was designed by Samuel J. Brown, an architect based in Boston, Massachusetts. The Beleden estate, originally extending to the east and south and now subdivided with residential development, was landscaped by Ernest W. Bowditch. The house, now standing on a reduced parcel of 1.7 acres (0.69 ha), remains an architectural center of its neighborhood.

== See also ==
- National Register of Historic Places listings in Hartford County, Connecticut
