= Pastures Historic District =

Historic district in New York, United States

- U.S. National Register of Historic Places
- U.S. Historic district
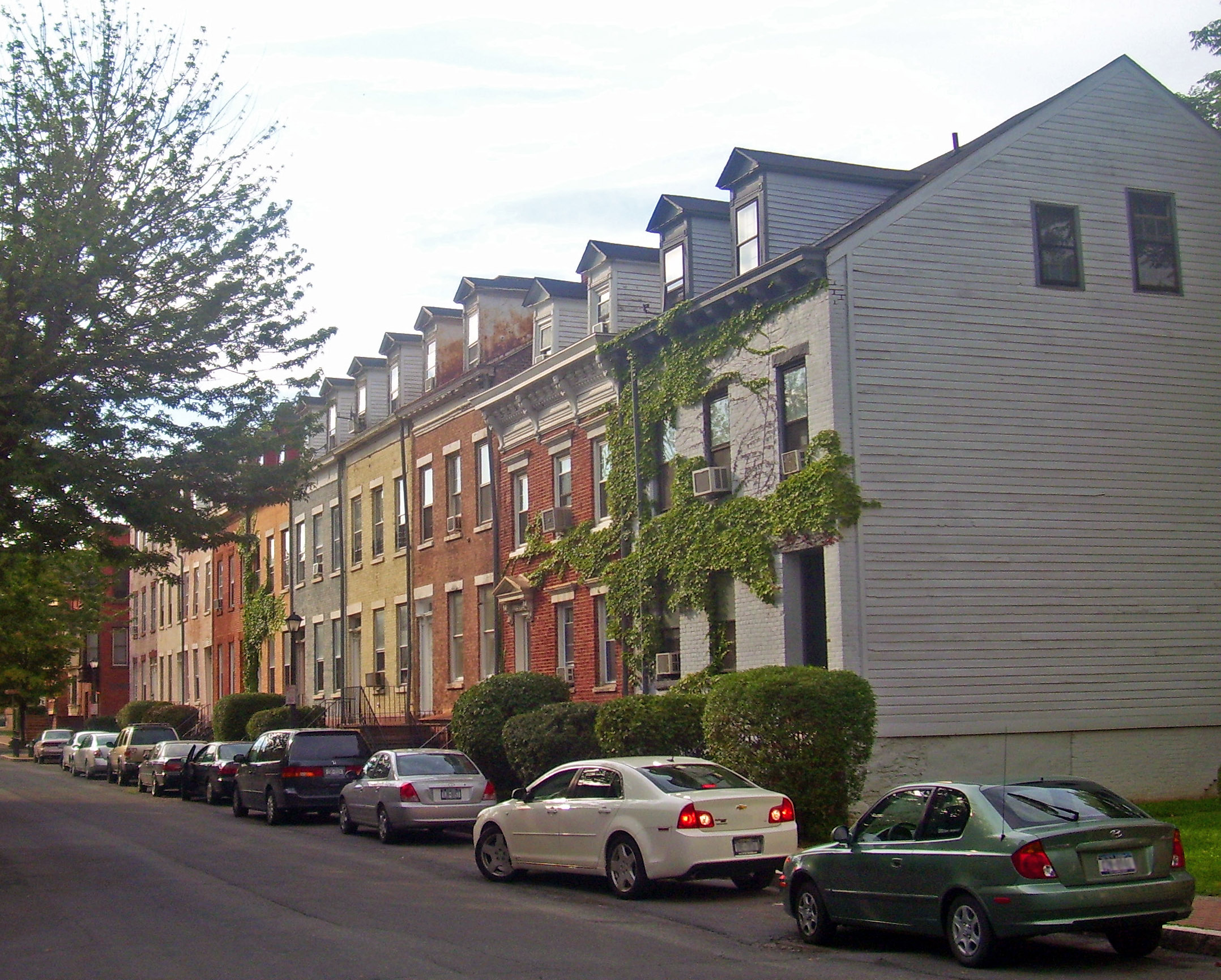
- Houses on north side of Westerlo Street, 2008

- Location within New York Location within the United States
- Location: Albany, NY
- Coordinates: 42°38′37″N 73°45′15″W
- Area: 17 acres (6.9 ha)
- Built: early 19th century
- Architectural style: Greek Revival
- NRHP reference No.: 72000815
- Added to NRHP: 1972

The Pastures Historic District is a residential neighborhood located south of downtown Albany, New York, United States. Its 17 acres (6.9 ha) include all or part of a 13-block area.

It was originally an area set aside as communal pasture by Albany's city council in the late 17th century and deeded to the Dutch Reformed Church. As the city began to grow following its designation as New York's state capital a century later, it was subdivided into building lots, some of which were developed with small rowhouses. Many open areas remain today, and the houses have not been significantly altered. In 1972 the city designated it as a historic district and it was listed on the National Register of Historic Places. All but two buildings in the district are considered historic.

One of Albany's busiest neighborhoods in the 19th century, the area fell into decline during the third quarter of the 20th as citizens left the city for the suburbs. Instead of the wholesale demolition of that era's urban renewal programs, the city government attempted to preserve and revitalize the area, evacuating the residents for years and demolishing some properties, a move that has been criticized as destroying the neighborhood as a standard urban renewal project would have. A recent mortgage fraud scandal has affected the neighborhood also, but it has once again become a diverse, fully occupied neighborhood.

== Geography ==
The Pastures Historic District is located on the south side of the South Mall Expressway that leads traffic from the Dunn Memorial Bridge over the Hudson River into Empire State Plaza, the modernist complex that houses New York's state government offices. The area is almost flat, rising minimally away from the river, in contrast to the Mansion Historic District, which rises up the slope to the west.

The district boundary is described as Madison Avenue on the north, South Ferry Street on the south, Dongan and Green streets on the east and South Pearl Street (NY 32) on the west. Bleeker, Franklin, Herkimer, John, South Lansing and Westerlo between South Pearl and Green are within the district. The actual boundary was not clarified by the city and state until 12 years after the district was listed, and does not follow those streets completely, excluding some more modern properties and areas where demolitions took place.

As defined in 1984, no property that actually fronts on South Pearl is within the district. All the properties along the south side of Madison are included, as are those on the west side of Green. Just south of Herkimer the three properties on the east side of Green are within the boundary, and then one block south of South Lansing it takes in the rows on the east side again as well as the north side of Westerlo.

The entire block with the now-closed St. John's Roman Catholic Church is included, and the boundary follows Dongan to the South Ferry corner, where it turns west to follow that street. As at the northern end, all properties along the north side of South Ferry are within the district. It excludes the lot at the corner of South Pearl and follows the rear lines of houses on South Ferry to Franklin Street, leaving out not only the newer buildings along South Pearl but the parking lots behind them as well. It follows the property lines along Westerlo west of Franklin to include the houses on both sides of that street, then returns to Franklin again.

All the houses on both sides of Herkimer between Franklin and South Pearl are within the boundary. The parking lot that was once the western block of Bleeker is outside the district, and then the boundary returns to the rear lot lines along Madison.

There are 112 buildings in this 17-acre (7 ha) area. Only two are not considered contributing properties to the district's historic character. Many of the buildings are rowhouses in the Federal and Greek Revival styles. They do not fully cover their lots, leaving a considerable amount of open space in the district. Some of it is taken up by off-street parking, some of it is left undeveloped as lawns and parks, and a tennis court has been built on John Street between Franklin and Green (complemented by two others just outside the district).

The only non-residential properties are three institutions: the former St. John's Church, its school and a synagogue. School No. 15, the only educational building in the district, burned down in 1979, during the city's attempts to revitalize the neighborhood.

== History ==
The Pastures was made available for development not long after American independence, but took a while to become a popular building location. Three-quarters of its buildings were constructed between 1815 and 1855. Some were later demolished during the 1970s.

=== 17th and 18th centuries ===
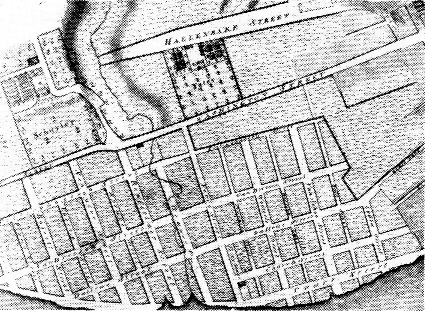
Street plan for the Pastures developed in 1794

The Dutch colonists who founded what became Albany in the mid-17th century set aside this land, outside the city's stockade, as common pasture. In 1687, the year after Albany became an English colonial city and received its charter, the city council donated the land to the Dutch Reformed Church. The land remained in the church's hands, used as pasture, for almost a century.

What is today South Pearl Street was the only route to, or through, the area. It was a path used to take cattle to graze and was known as "Cow Street" occasionally for that reason. Modest homes were built along it north of the stockade after the death of the original landowner in 1766. When George Washington supposedly used it to visit the Schuyler Mansion in 1783, the street became Washington Street.

After the Revolutionary War and independence, the city urged the church to subdivide the land into building-sized lots and sell them for development. This took place slowly, mainly along the main streets. The early settlers of the area, the city's first growth outside of its stockade, were mostly wealthy families who built in the Federal style popular in the early republic.

=== 19th century ===
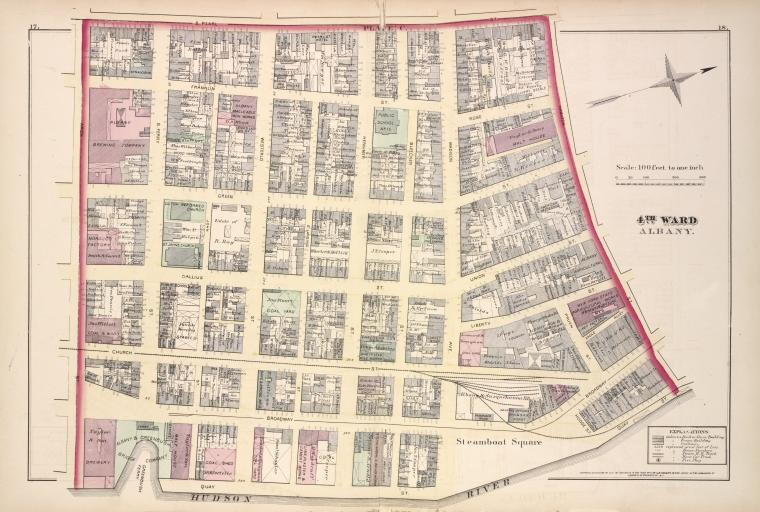
Map of Albany's 4th Ward in 1878. The Pastures was included in this ward.

Spencer Stafford, a successful merchant, built 100 Madison Avenue in 1808. It remains the oldest building in the district and one of the oldest in the city. The nearby house at 96 Madison, built three years later, was considered the most elegant private home in the city at that time. Four of the six houses on the row next to it at 82–94 Madison, built after another three years, in 1814, were owned by Union College founder Dudley Walsh. Citizens of more modest means also settled in the Pastures. There were homes of tradesmen, craftsmen and free African Americans as well.

In the next two decades, stone yards were opened at several locations in the future district. Middle-class citizens continued settling there, joined by carpenters and builders who bought several lots at once, put up a row, lived in one unit and rented out the others. The houses they built, many of which survive on South Ferry between Franklin and Green, introduced the third story, gabled roof and dormer windows to the neighborhood. Joseph C. Yates lived at 96 Madison while he served as governor.

As building continued into the late 1830s and 1840s, houses reflected an austere Greek Revival style. They were mostly brick laid in Flemish bond primarily, with running and American bond appearing more. Plain pilasters flanked the recessed entrances, with little ornament on the front facades. Newer roofing materials and methods made flat roofs possible. Some frame stores, most since demolished, were constructed in the neighborhood.

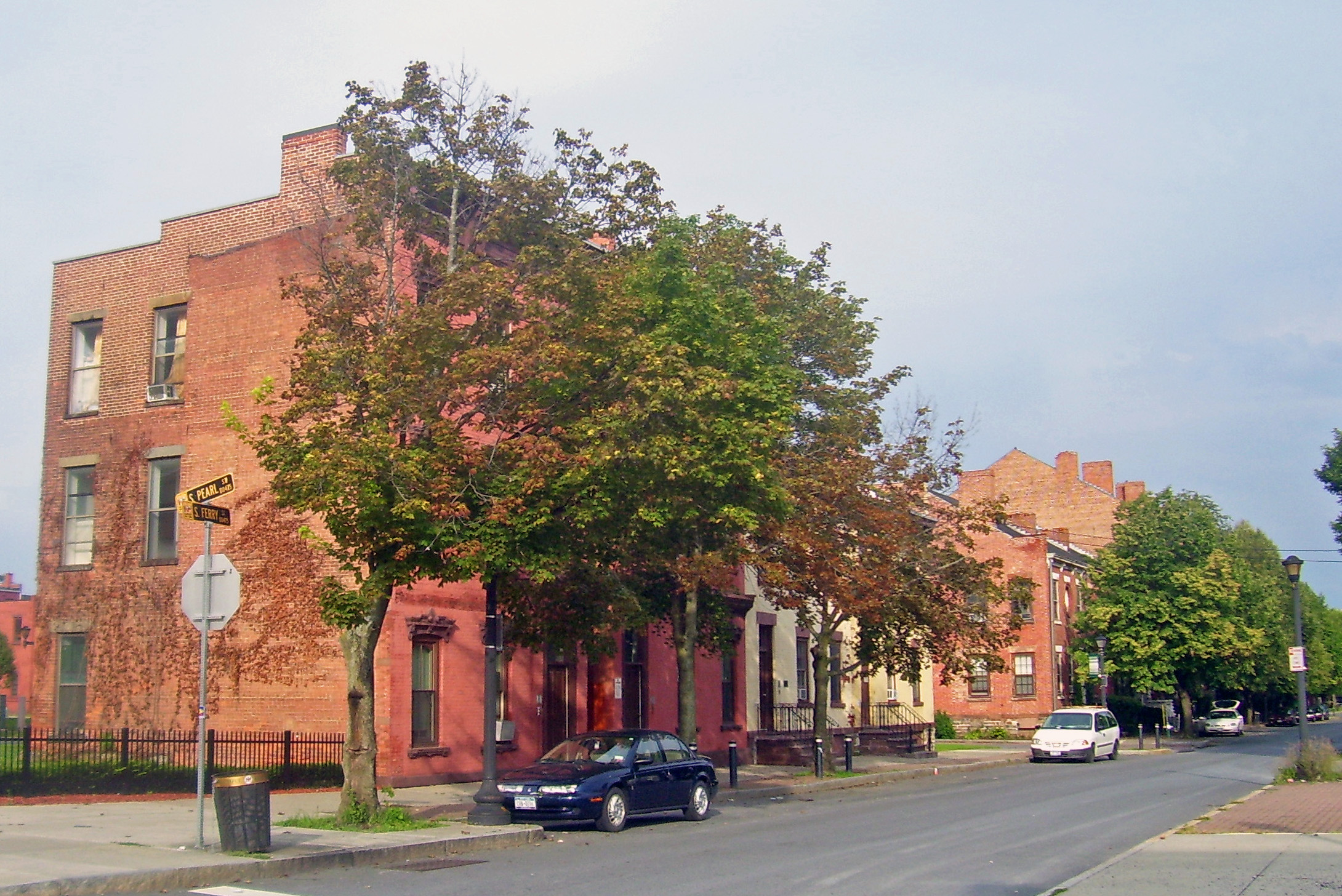
South Ferry from South Pearl

The years before, during and after the Civil War were the last for large-scale building within the Pastures. The neighborhood was getting built up, such that a school was built, and other, newer areas of the city were available. Most new rowhouses replaced earlier frame buildings, with 51–55 Westerlo Street the only significant new grouping. Mixed-use development began to appear, with new houses having commercial space on the first story and living space above. Ornate storefronts survive at 79 South Ferry and 104 Madison. Older houses also saw their facades updated with timely decorations like bracketed cornices, metal lintels and ornate friezes. Third stories were added to some flat-roofed buildings.

There are a few scattered houses from around the district postdating this period. The ornate brickwork at 77 Westerlo, dating to 1886, stands out in its neighborhood. On the other extreme, the austerity of 68 and 70 Westerlo reflects vernacular applications of early 20th century styles. The greatest change to the district in this period was the conversion of some residences on Madison west of Franklin into stores.

=== 20th century ===
In the first decade of the new century, a Roman Catholic Church and synagogue were built in the district. The Gothic Revival stone towers of St. John's, at 140 Green Street, began looming over the district in 1903, along with its neighboring school. The brick Beth El Jacob following in 1907 at 76 Herkimer Street. The neighborhood was complete now.

Pastures' storefronts became known for their jazz bars, and as Albany's red-light district, in the early 20th century. In 1940, 76 Westerlo Street became the youngest contributing property in the future historic district. During the war years, the Pastures remained a thriving, socioeconomically and ethnically diverse neighborhood.

In the 1950s, suburbanization began, and affluent Albanians began leaving. The construction of Empire State Plaza during the 1960s displaced more residents, and the city's central areas, including the Pastures began showing signs of urban decay. Late in the decade, the city's new Historic Resources Commission designated the area the Pastures Preservation District and got it listed on the Register in 1972.

Having recognized the area's historic character and importance, the city had big plans for the area. The Democratic political machine of Daniel P. O'Connell mostly eschewed the federal Title I funds for the massive urban renewal programs of the era, since they wanted to retain control of patronage. With what money they did have, they chose a plan that would, they hoped, "revitalize" the neighborhood and preserve what had been recognized as special about it. They moved residents out, temporarily they hoped, while selected decrepit buildings were demolished and new ones built in sympathetic styles. Nearly half of all the buildings in the district were demolished, the rest "mothballed" without heating.

While the neighborhood was vacant, the city sought a developer willing to take on the whole area. Individuals who approached with plans to buy and restore one or two houses at a time, and live there when finished, were turned away while the buildings remained empty and decayed further, some of them succumbing to arson, including the school.

By 1980 the city reduced its expectations and looked only for developers for whole blocks, not the neighborhood. Half of the finished units would have to rented to low-income families. Eventually the Pastures was repopulated, but to some critics the damage to both its human and architectural character had been done. "The real place ceased to exist when its last resident was trundled off to a distant housing project", urbanist Roberta Brandes Gratz wrote a quarter-century later. She calls the Pastures project "a vivid example of the inappropriateness of Historic Preservation as The Answer". Some of the buildings have, she notes, been incorrectly restored and "the area looks more like a sanitized suburban enclave ... than an urban neighborhood".

=== 21st century ===
By the early 21st century the neighborhood had fully repopulated again, and the city's planning commissioner noted the "mix of incomes and occupations that we strive for in our city neighborhoods." Many units had been set aside as Section 8 affordable housing, and small businesses had moved into the area. 96 Madison is now a bed and breakfast. Residents like its walkability and proximity to downtown, with one even comparing it to Greenwich Village.

The neighborhood seemed to be getting over its recent past when another redevelopment-related setback occurred. At the beginning of the century, Aaron Dare, former head of the Northeast New York chapter of the Urban League, began filing falsified mortgage applications for a variety of Albany properties, including Historic Pastures Village Apartments, through his company, Emerge Real Properties. He and his co-conspirators made it appear that they had the capital to borrow from the Department of Housing and Urban Development (HUD) to buy the properties. After the closing, he failed to repay the loans and they quickly went into default, forcing HUD to foreclose. He was eventually investigated and arrested. In 2006 he pleaded guilty to various charges of conspiracy and fraud. Two years later he was sentenced to 63 months in prison and ordered to pay almost $2 million in restitution to his victims.

== See also ==
- National Register of Historic Places listings in Albany, New York
- History of Albany, New York
