= Federal Hill Historic District (Bristol, Connecticut) =

Historic district in Connecticut, United States

- U.S. National Register of Historic Places
- U.S. Historic district
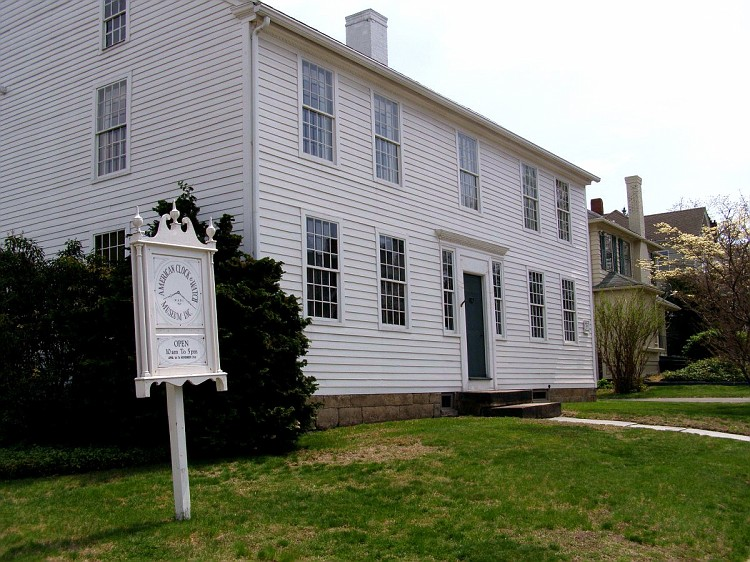

- Location within Connecticut Location within the United States
- Location: Roughly bounded by Summer, Maple, Woodland, Goodwin, and High Streets, Bristol, Connecticut
- Coordinates: 41°40′35″N 72°56′27″W
- Area: 90 acres (36 ha)
- Architect: Case, Joel; Et al.
- Architectural style: Colonial Revival, Mid 19th Century Revival, Late Victorian
- NRHP reference No.: 86001989
- Added to NRHP: August 28, 1986

The Federal Hill Historic District encompasses a predominantly residential area of Bristol, Connecticut, known for its high-quality 19th and early 20th-century residential architecture. Centered around the Federal Hill Green, it developed as a fashionable residential area, and features a large number of fine Italianate and Victorian houses. It was listed on the National Register of Historic Places in 1986.

== Description and history ==
The city of Bristol was settled in the 1720s as part of Farmington, from which it was formally separated in 1785. A separate parish had been established in 1744 at the top of Federal Hill, a prominent rise northeast of the present downtown. What is now the Federal Hill Green was part of the original town green, and is where Bristol's first church and school were located. Changes in transportation routes in the 19th century reduced this center's economic importance, and most civic functions were eventually established elsewhere. It remained a focus of religious activities (there are four churches in the district), and became a fashionable location for wealthy businesspeople to build homes. This began in the 1840s, and reached its height in the last four decades of the 19th century.

The historic district is roughly bounded on the west by a railroad right-of-way which skirts around the base of the hill, and on the south by High Street. To the east and north it is bounded by areas filled with construction after the 1920s. There are more than 250 primary buildings (houses, churches, schools, and a few commercial buildings) in the district, and a number of period outbuildings, mainly garages and barns or carriage houses. The architectural styles seen the most are the Italianate of the 1850s-1870s, and the Queen Anne Victorian. Probably the most opulent house in the district is the Beleden House, a Beaux Arts mansion built in 1908-10 for a local merchant and banker, which is individually listed on the National Register for its architecture.

== See also ==
- National Register of Historic Places listings in Hartford County, Connecticut
