= Schuyler Mansion =

Historic house in New York, United States

- Philip Schuyler Mansion
- U.S. National Register of Historic Places
- U.S. National Historic Landmark
- U.S. Historic district – Contributing property
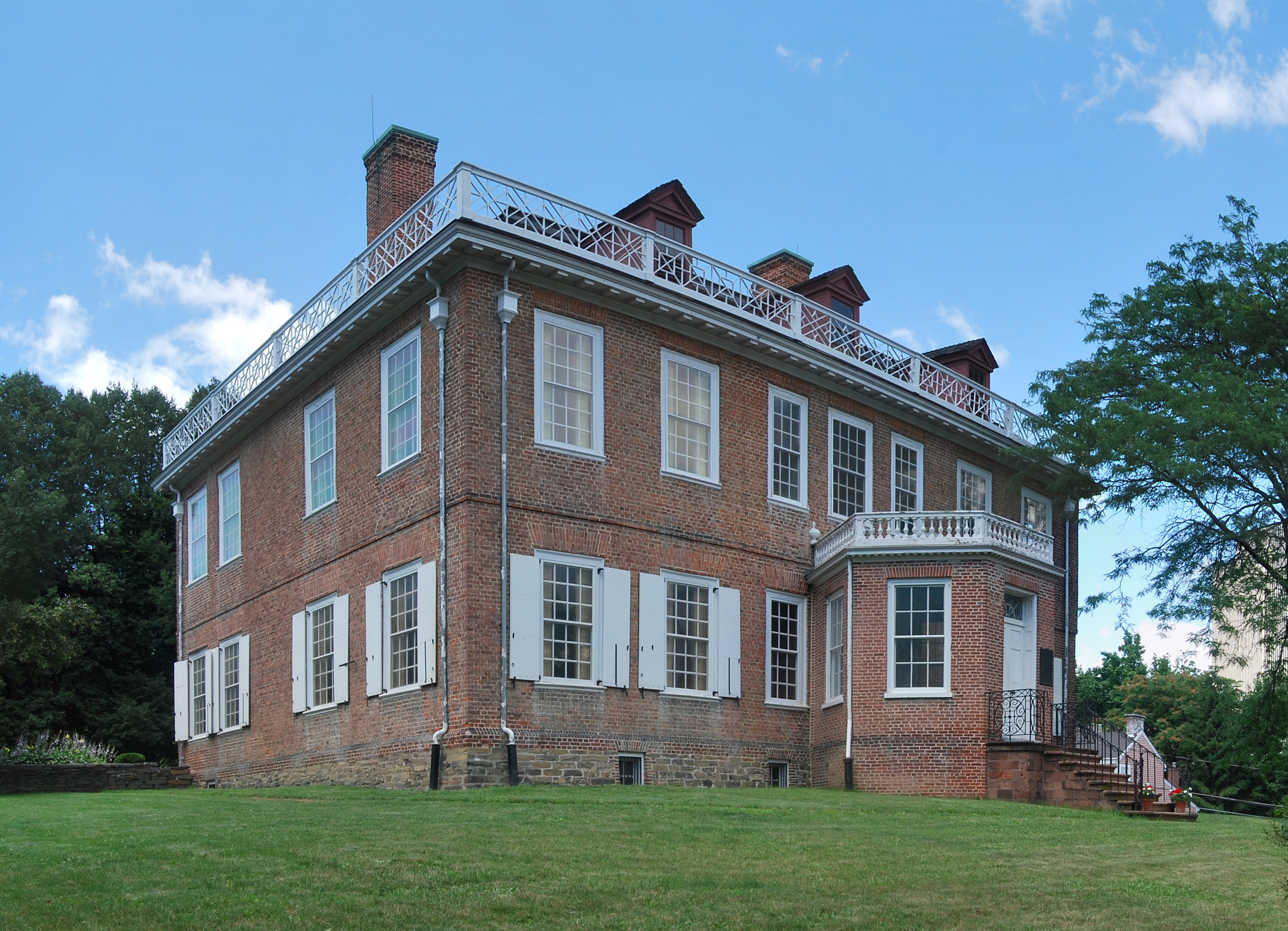
- South profile and east elevation, 2011

- Location within New York Location within the United States
- Location: 32 Catherine Street, Albany, New York, United States
- Coordinates: 42°38′23″N 73°45′38″W
- Built: 1761–1765
- Architect: John Gaborial
- Architectural style: Georgian
- Part of: South End–Groesbeckville Historic District
- NRHP reference No.: 67000008

Significant dates
- Added to NRHP: December 24, 1967
- Designated NHL: December 24, 1967

Schuyler Mansion is a historic house at 32 Catherine Street in Albany, New York. The brick mansion is now a museum and an official National Historic Landmark. It was constructed from 1761 to 1765 for Philip Schuyler, later a general in the Continental Army and early U.S. Senator, who resided there from 1763 until his death in 1804. It was declared a National Historic Landmark on December 24, 1967. It is also a contributing property to the South End–Groesbeckville Historic District, listed on the National Register of Historic Places in 1984.

== History ==
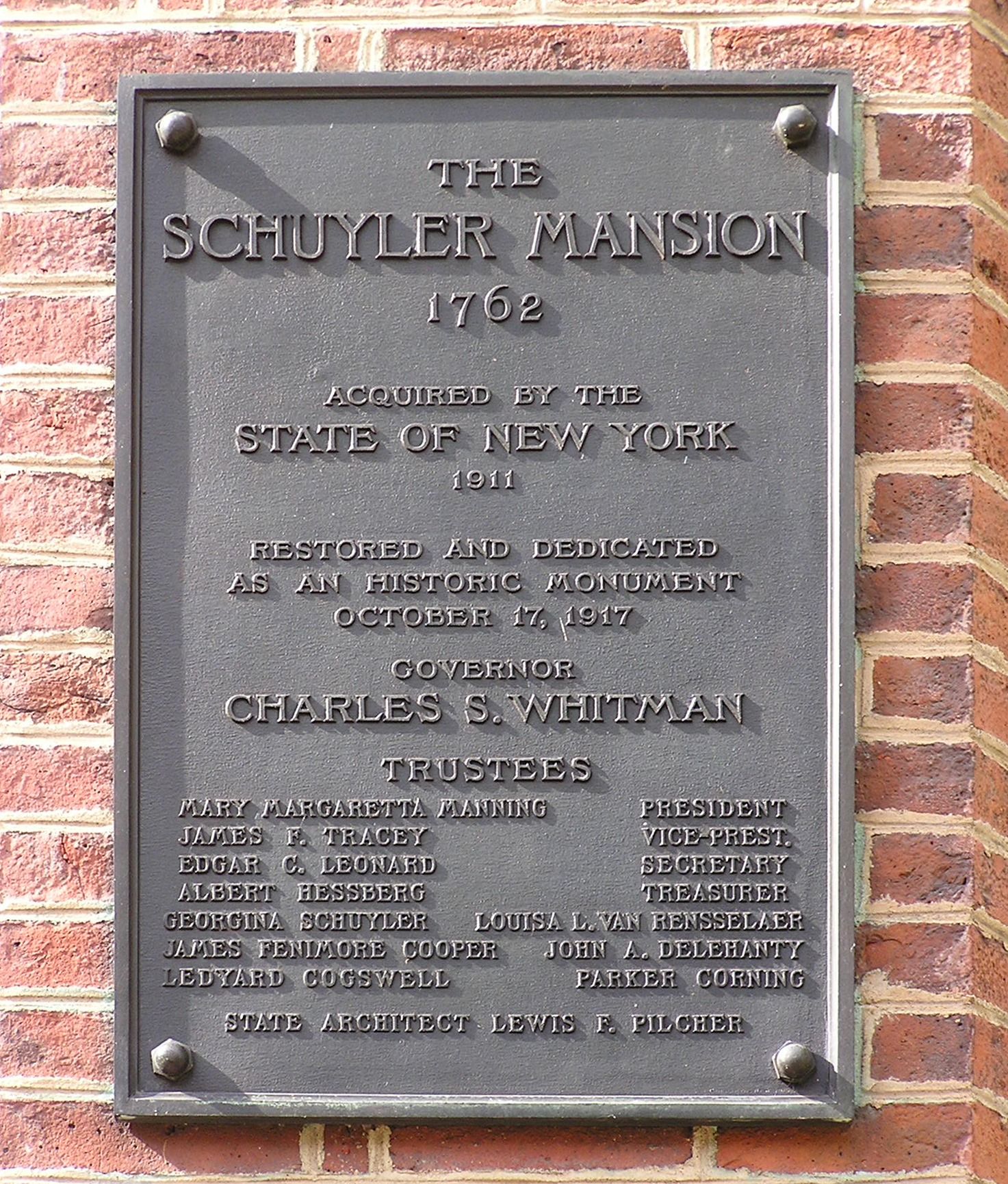
Dedication Plaque (1917)

Revolutionary War General Philip Schuyler began construction on his Georgian-style estate near Albany, New York in 1761. Prior to that time, due to the outbreak of the French and Indian War, it was considered inadvisable to build outside of the City of Albany. Therefore, the construction of the family's mansion occurred from 1761 to 1765, during the tail end of that war. The mansion was built on eighty acres (32 ha) of land, located approximately one-half mile (800 m) from the city. At the time that the Schuylers moved into their new home, Philip and his wife, Catherine Van Rensselaer Schuyler, already had three daughters: Angelica, Elizabeth, and Margarita. Margarita was also known as Peggy. During Philip and Catherine's lifetime, Catherine gave birth to fifteen children. However, only eight survived infancy. The seven that did not survive included one set of twins and one set of triplets. Of the eight surviving children, the Schuyler family had their three aforementioned daughters, born in 1756, 1757, and 1758, respectively. These three daughters, born within two and a half years and very much alike, were known as the Schuyler sisters. After the family had settled into the mansion, Catherine gave birth to three boys; John Bradstreet (1765), Philip Jeremiah (1768), and Rensselaer (1773), and then two more girls, Cornelia (1775) and Catherine (1781). During the Schuyler family's occupancy of the mansion, the house served as a center of military, business, and family affairs, including the wedding of Philip and Catherine's second daughter, Elizabeth, to famed Federalist, Alexander Hamilton. The latter portion of the American Revolution saw Philip Schuyler in the position of an intelligence officer for the American side, operating a network of spies out of his home. These activities led to the infiltration of the mansion and failed attempt to kidnap Schuyler on the evening of August 7, 1781. Additionally, the Schuyler family was well known for their hospitality, and the mansion hosted guests such as George and Martha Washington, Benjamin Franklin, the Marquis de Chastellux, and James Madison. The family also hosted the British general during the Battle of Saratoga, John Burgoyne, who stayed at the mansion as a "prisoner guest" in 1777.

=== Death of Philip Schuyler ===
After Philip Schuyler's death in 1804, the land comprised over one hundred building lots which were divided among his six living children. The house itself, however, was wanted by none of Schuyler's offspring, as they had already established themselves elsewhere with spouses and children of their own. Therefore, in 1815, Schuyler's mansion was sold to a furrier named John Bryan. During Bryan's approximately 29 years living in the mansion, he made a number of changes to the house, including the addition of a vestibule, constructed by local architect, Philip Hooker, which still exists today. In 1844, the mansion was purchased by Ezekiel C. McIntosh, the president of the Mohawk and Hudson Railroad Company. After McIntosh's death in 1855, his widow, Caroline Carmichael, remarried former U.S. President Millard Fillmore. Their wedding took place in the same parlor as the wedding of Alexander Hamilton and Elizabeth Schuyler. The newlywed couple left the mansion to live at Fillmore's estate in Buffalo, New York. The mansion was then leased to a man named John Tracey and his family. The Tracey family were responsible for the removal of any remaining outbuildings that had existed on the property during Philip Schuyler's time. In 1882, following the death of Caroline Fillmore, the Traceys vacated the mansion. The next owner of the mansion was Lansing Pendleton Jr., a watchman at the local jail. His tenancy was short-lived and, in 1886, he sold the house to the Roman Catholic Diocese of Albany for $7,000. The mansion was repurposed as an orphanage for infants through children seven years of age that was operated by the Sisters of Charity and called St. Francis de Sales Infant Asylum. Under the ownership of the Diocese, the mansion's main parlor was converted into a chapel, and many of the fireplaces were bricked up. The orphanage soon ran out of space in the mansion, even after constructing a second building (which was demolished shortly after the orphanage vacated the site). It was clear that the Diocese either had to demolish the mansion, or sell it and use the money to buy and build on another site. The sisters in charge of the asylum were enthusiastic about the notion of preservation, so refused to sell the mansion to anyone besides the state or a "patriotic society.”

=== Acquisition by New York State ===
On March 22, 1911, the mansion was sold to the state of New York, which planned to turn it into an historic site that would be open to the public. The museum's first board of directors consisted of Philip Schuyler's great-great-granddaughter, Georgina Schuyler, as well as the son of John Tracey, who had lived in the house in the nineteenth century. The orphanage built their new site over the next few years, and vacated the mansion on January 30, 1914. After over three years of restoration, Schuyler Mansion was opened to the public as a state historic site on October 17, 1917, the 140th anniversary of the Battle of Saratoga.

== Structure ==
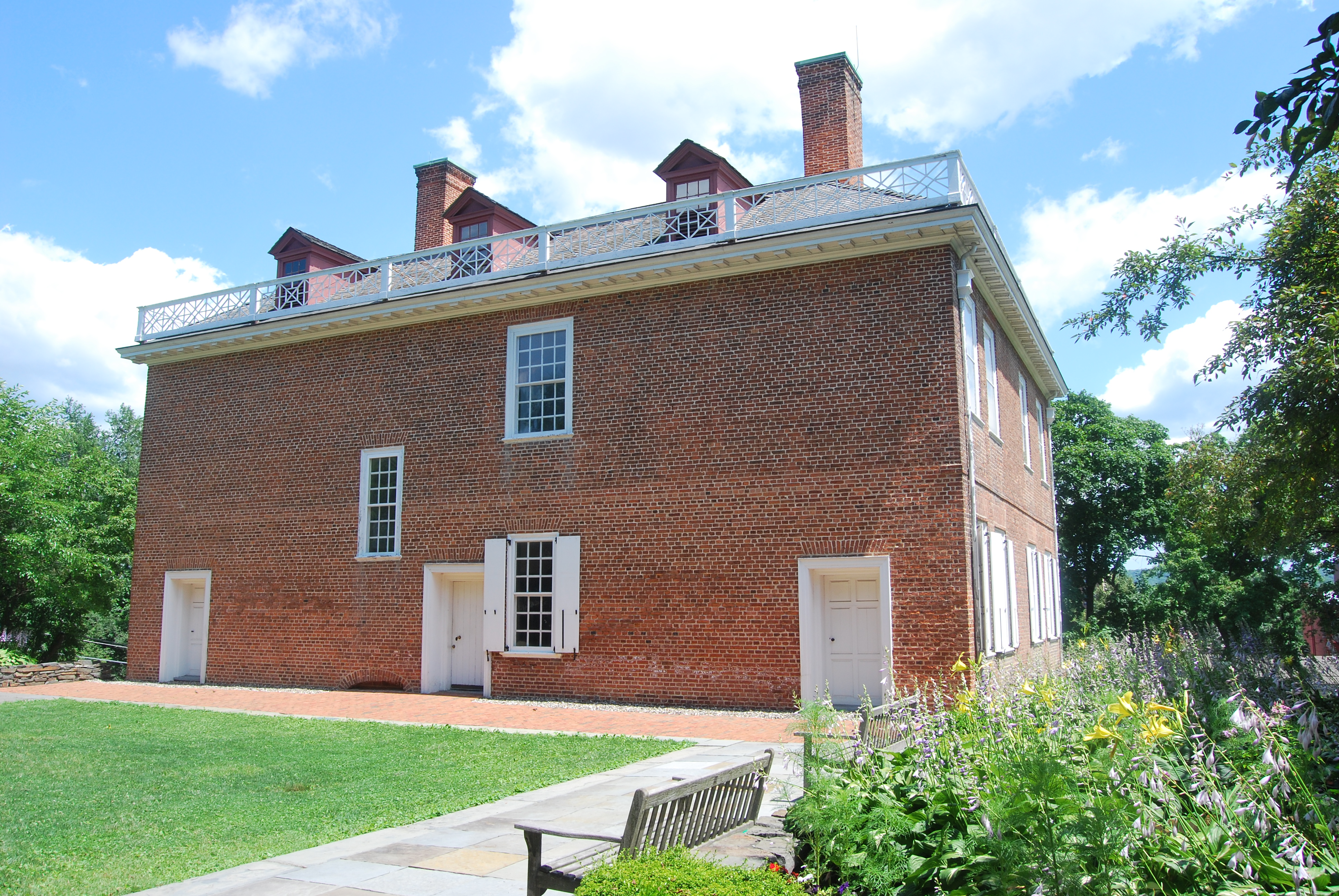
Rear of the Schuyler Mansion

Schuyler Mansion is a large (67.5 feet [20.6 m] wide by 47.5 feet [14.5 m] deep) two-and-one-half-story Georgian house, built between 1761 and 1765. It occupies a sloping site in southern Albany, facing east toward the Hudson River. The walls are brick, laid in English bond with tooled joints, over a stone foundation. The building is covered by a double-pitched hip roof. A wooden balustrade with Chinese fret panels and posts topped by urns surrounds the roof directly above the cornice. This balustrade was not part of the original structure, but was installed in the early years of the 19th century. Two brick interior chimneys rise above the roof.

Construction of the mansion was supervised by master carpenter John Gaborial of Boston, Massachusetts. At the time of the house's construction, two detached wings were erected to the rear of the house. The building on the southwest corner was used as an office and the one on the northwest corner served as the kitchen. These wings were removed during the 19th century, and the space that they once occupied is now landscaped as a garden. The house is built on the center-hall plan typical of Georgian homes. Both the first and second floors have two rooms, each about 18 by 19 feet (5.5 by 5.8 m), on either side of the wide corridors. The entrance hall, 48 feet (15 m) long by 20 feet (6.1 m) wide and 12 feet (3.7 m) high, is divided towards the rear by a pilaster-supported doorway.

The interior of the mansion is considerably decorated. The deep brick walls permit the use on every window, of inside or wainscot shutters which fold against the jambs. The walls of the central hall were plastered and then hung with a set of scenic wallpaper imported from France. The center hall stairway is decorated with spiral balusters of three different profiles on each step.

== Photo gallery ==
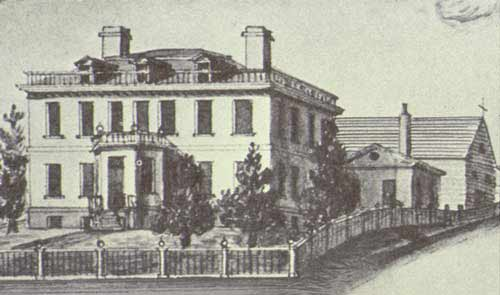
Watercolor drawing of the Schuyler Mansion made by Philip Hooker in 1818.

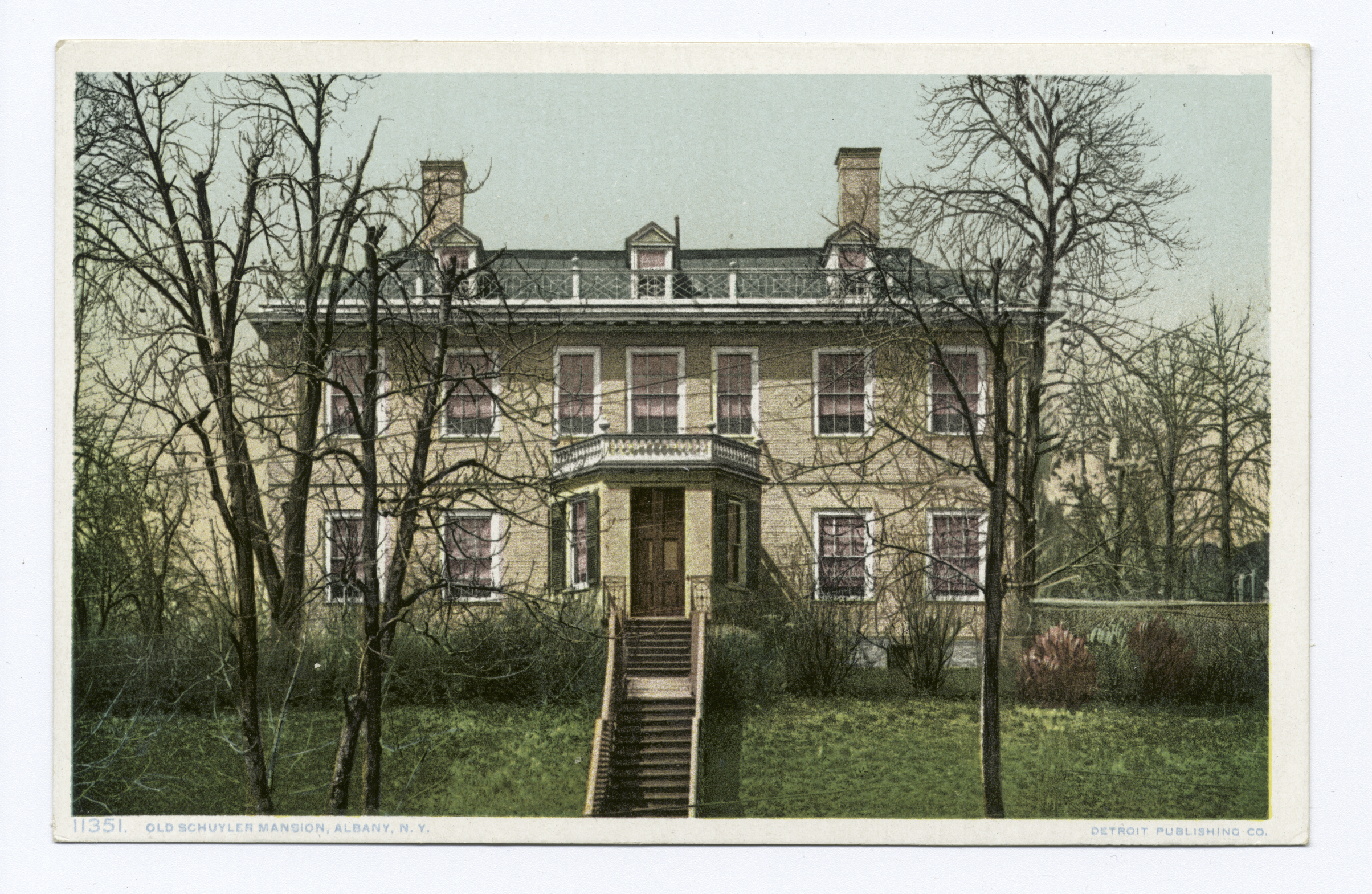
Old Schuyler Mansion in 1898.

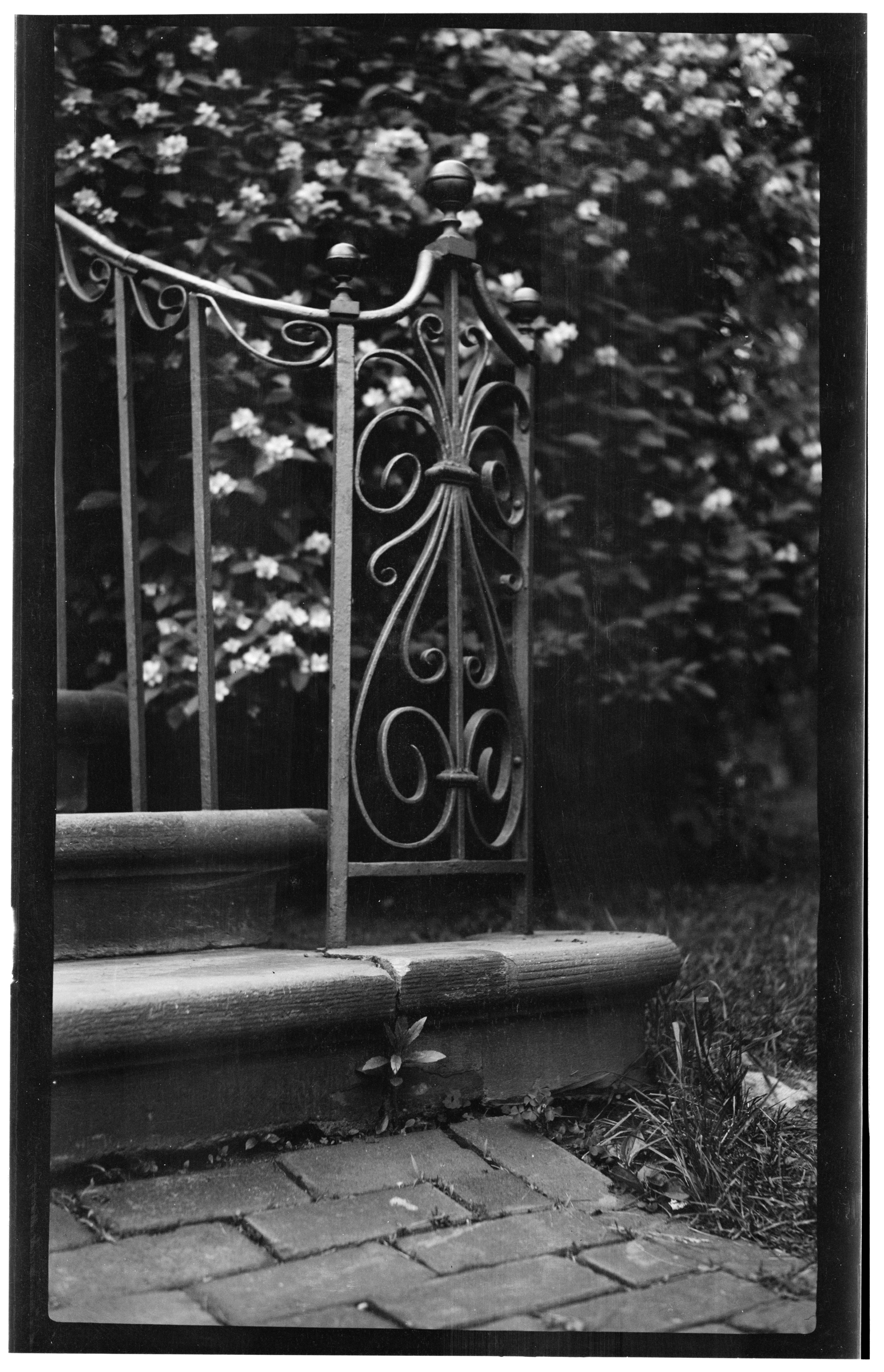
Detail of ironwork on the Mansion.

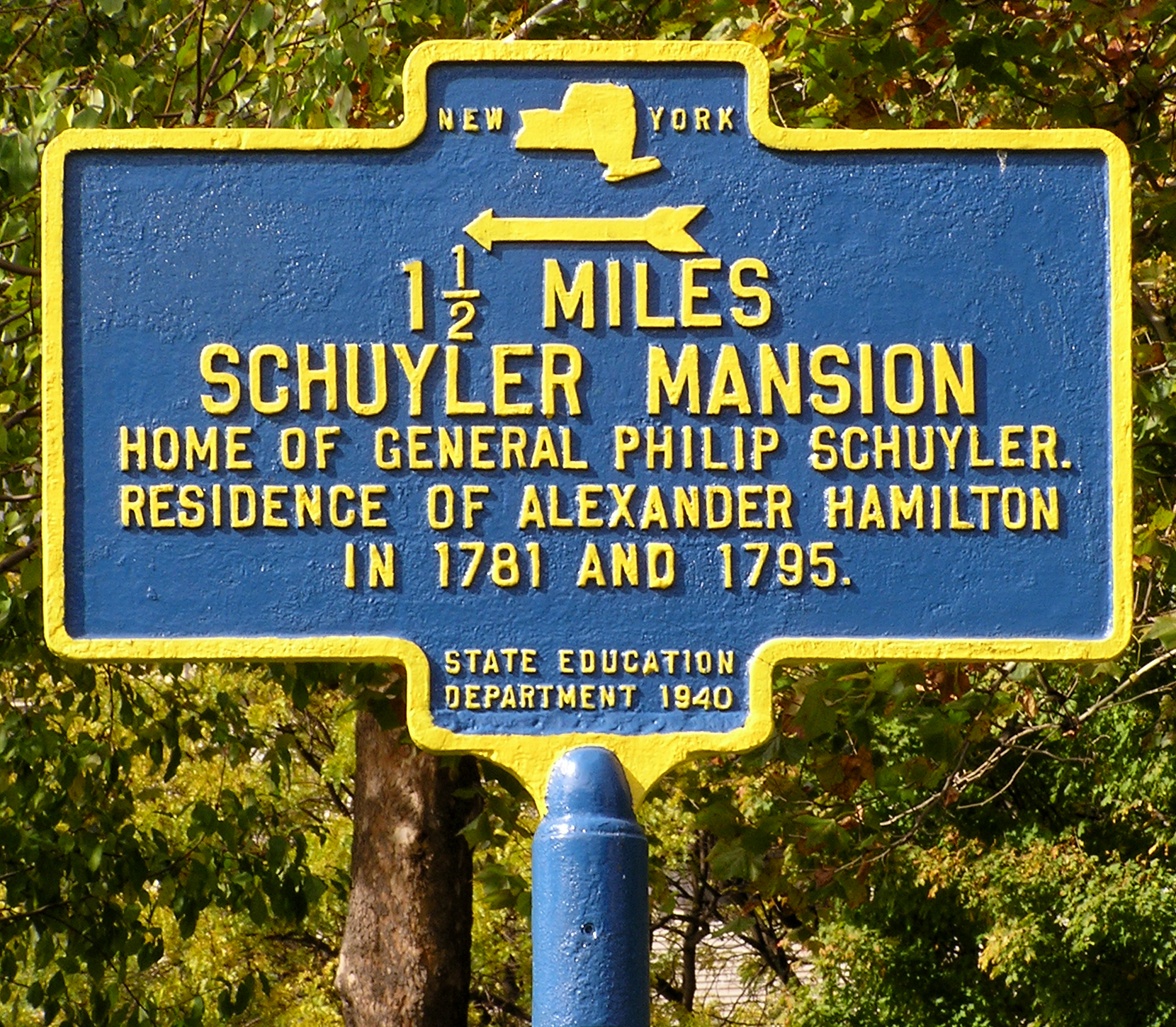
New York State historical marker, erected in 1940.

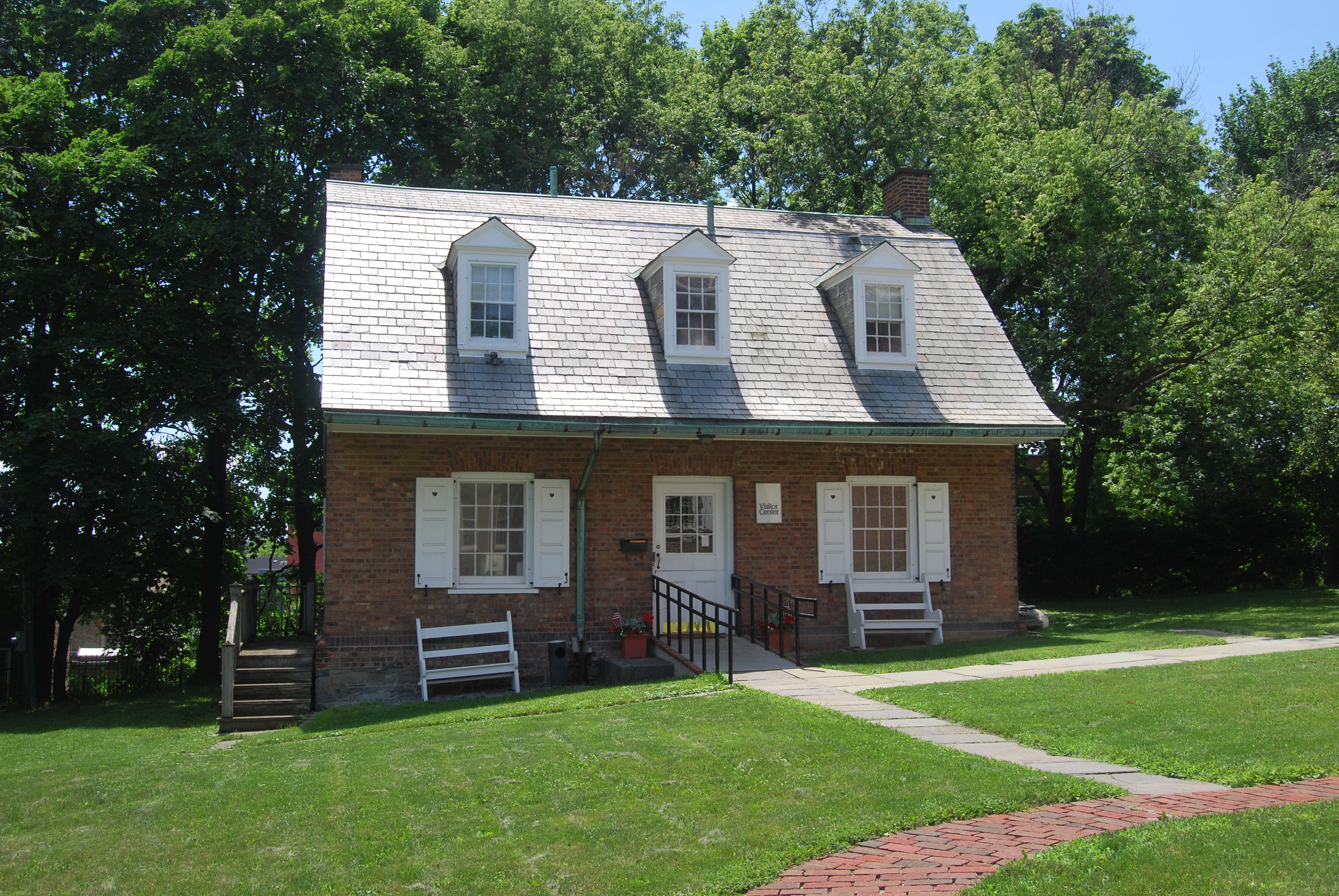
Visitor Center on the Mansion grounds (2011)

== See also ==
- History of Albany, New York
- List of National Historic Landmarks in New York
- List of New York State Historic Sites
- National Register of Historic Places listings in Albany, New York
- Ten Broeck Mansion
- General Schuyler House
