= List of county routes in Albany County, New York =

The Albany County, New York, Department of Public Works maintains nearly 290 miles (467 km) of roads and 78 bridges as county routes. All county routes in Albany County are signed with a blue pentagonal shield, the Manual on Uniform Traffic Control Devices' standard shield for county routes. Although quite a few county routes are in more than one town, the route number reflects the town that the largest portion of the route is in. Two county routes pass through the western portion of the city of Albany. Parts of New York State Route 32 (NY 32) and NY 155 are owned and maintained by Albany County and are thus co-signed as state touring routes and as Albany County routes.

== Routes 1–100 ==
=== Berne (1–14) ===
Routes numbered 1 through 14 are predominantly in the town of Berne.

Route	Length (mi)	Length (km)	From	Via	To	Notes
CR 1	11.25	18.11	NY 143 in Westerlo	Switz Kill Road	CR 254 in Berne	
CR 2	4.77	7.68	CR 1 in Westerlo	Cole Hill Road	NY 443 in Berne	
CR 3	2.61	4.20	CR 1	Willsie Road in Berne	CR 2	
CR 6	5.70	9.17	NY 85 in Rensselaerville	Ravine Road	CR 1 in Berne	
CR 9	3.79	6.10	NY 443	Bradt Hollow and Canaday Hill Roads in Berne	NY 443	
CR 10	5.00	8.05	CR 353 in Rensselaerville	Huntersland Road	Schoharie County line in Berne (becomes CR 21)	
CR 11	1.47	2.37	NY 85	Cass Hill and North Roads in Berne	NY 85	
CR 12	2.42	3.89	CR 10 in Rensselaerville	Garvey Hill and Rapp Roads	CR 10 in Berne	
CR 13	4.68	7.53	CR 6	Sickle Hill Road in Berne	CR 1	
CR 14	3.45	5.55	NY 85 in Westerlo	Joslyn School Road	NY 443 in Berne	

=== Bethlehem (50–55) ===
Routes numbered 50 through 55 are predominantly in the town of Bethlehem.

Route	Length (mi)	Length (km)	From	Via	To	Notes
CR 52	1.68	2.70	NY 32 / NY 910A	Elm Avenue Extension and Elm and Cherry Avenues in Bethlehem	NY 140	Overlaps with NY 32 for 0.80 miles (1.29 km)
CR 53 (1)	2.64	4.25	NY 396	South Albany and Old School Roads in Bethlehem	CR 55	Bridge over Selkirk railroad yard has been closed due to deterioration
CR 53 (2)	1.59	2.56	CR 55	Jericho Road in Bethlehem	US 9W	
CR 54	0.91	1.46	CR 102	Bell Crossing Road in Bethlehem	CR 53	
CR 55	3.66	5.89	NY 32	Creble Road in Bethlehem	US 9W	

== Routes 101–200 ==
=== Coeymans (101–112) ===
Routes numbered 101 through 112 are predominantly in the town of Coeymans.

Route	Length (mi)	Length (km)	From	Via	To	Notes
CR 101	3.57	5.75	US 9W in Coeymans	Undercliff Road and South Street	NY 396 in Bethlehem	
CR 102	8.47	13.63	NY 143 in Coeymans	Star and Old Quarry Roads	NY 32 in New Scotland	
CR 103	4.35	7.00	NY 143	Blodgett Hill Road in Coeymans	NY 396 / CR 301	
CR 106	1.38	2.22	NY 143	Tompkins Road in Coeymans	CR 102	
CR 108	2.45	3.94	NY 32	Copeland Hill Road in Coeymans	CR 301	
CR 109	3.47	5.58	NY 32 in Coeymans	Lawson Lake Road	CR 301 in New Scotland	
CR 111	4.05	6.52	Greene County line in Westerlo (becomes CR 38)	Alcove Road	NY 143 in Coeymans	
CR 112	0.71	1.14	Greene County line	Staco Road in Coeymans	CR 111	

=== Colonie (151–163) ===
Routes numbered 151 through 163 are predominantly in the town of Colonie.

Route	Length (mi)	Length (km)	From	Via	To	Notes
CR 151	5.91	9.51	CR 155	Albany Shaker Road and Dalessondro Boulevard in Colonie	NY 7	Overlaps with NY 155 from CR 153 to CR 157 at Albany International Airport
CR 152	2.87	4.62	US 9	Old Niskayuna Road in Colonie	NY 155	
CR 153	0.79	1.27	NY 155 / CR 151 at I-87 exits 3&4 near Albany International Airport	Wolf Road in Colonie	NY 155 (Watervliet Shaker Road)	Entire length overlaps with NY 155; informally called "Old Wolf Road" to distinguish it from the state-maintained section between NY 5 and CR 151
CR 154	2.98	4.80	NY 5	Osborne and Sand Creek Roads in Colonie	US 9 / NY 378	
CR 155	1.22	1.96	Albany city line	Everett Rd in Colonie	CR 151	
CR 156	1.94	3.12	US 20 in Guilderland	Fuller Road	NY 5 in Colonie	
CR 157	5.65	9.09	US 20 / NY 155 in Guilderland	Karner, New Karner, and Watervliet Shaker Roads	NY 155 / CR 151 at Albany International Airport	Entire length overlaps with NY 155
CR 160	0.98	1.58	Dead end at Albany International Airport	Sicker Road in Colonie	CR 151	
CR 163 (1)	0.37	0.60	Airline Drive	Heritage Lane in Colonie	NY 155 / CR 151	Formerly part of CR 151 and CR 157
CR 163 (2)	0.50	0.80	Dead end at Albany International Airport	Old Albany Shaker Road in Colonie	Dead end	Formerly part of CR 151

== Routes 201–300 ==
=== Guilderland (201–208) ===
Routes numbered 201 through 208 are predominantly in the town of Guilderland.

Route	Length (mi)	Length (km)	From	Via	To	Notes
CR 201	5.19	8.35	CR 306 in Voorheesville	North Main Street and Grant Hill, Stone, and Depot Roads	NY 146 in Guilderland	Depot Road was named after a former Department of Defense depot, now the Northeast Industrial Park
CR 202	3.77	6.07	NY 156 in New Scotland	Meadowdale and School Roads	NY 146 in Guilderland	
CR 203	3.65	5.87	CR 306 in New Scotland	Normans Kill and Johnston Roads	US 20 in Guilderland	
CR 204	2.60	4.18	Albany city line in Bethlehem	Russell, Krumkill, and Schoolhouse Roads	US 20 in Guilderland	
CR 208	1.74	2.80	NY 156 in Voorheesville	School Road	CR 201 in Guilderland	

=== Knox (251–262) ===
Routes numbered 251 through 262 are predominantly in the town of Knox.

Route	Length (mi)	Length (km)	From	Via	To	Notes
CR 252	9.39	15.11	NY 157A in Berne	Knox Cave Road	Schenectady County line in Knox (becomes CR 131)	
CR 253	7.69	12.38	CR 252 in Knox	Bozen Kill Road and Maple Avenue Extension	NY 146 in Altamont	
CR 254 (1)	1.92	3.09	NY 443 in Knox	Rock Road	NY 156 in Knox	
CR 254 (2)	4.10	6.60	NY 156	Pleasant Valley Road in Knox	NY 156	
CR 255	2.18	3.51	Schoharie County line (becomes CR 24)	Knox–Gallupville Road in Knox	NY 156	
CR 256	1.65	2.66	NY 157	Ketcham Road in Knox	NY 157	
CR 259	3.25	5.23	CR 255	Beebe Road in Knox	CR 252	
CR 260	1.69	2.72	NY 156	Witter Road in Knox	NY 146	
CR 261	1.25	2.01	NY 146	Bell Road in Knox	CR 253	
CR 262	4.49	7.23	CR 255	Gage and Middle Roads in Knox	NY 146	

=== Green Island (278) ===
George Street, a 0.73-mile (1.17 km) street in the village of Green Island, is designated as County Route 278. Maintenance of the route is shared between the county and the village as the village is responsible for everyday maintenance while the county is responsible for reconstruction when it is needed. It is not signed as a county route.

== Routes 301–400 ==
=== New Scotland (301–312) ===
Routes numbered 301 through 312 are predominantly in the town of New Scotland.

Route	Length (mi)	Length (km)	From	Via	To	Notes
CR 301	5.91	9.51	NY 443 in New Scotland	Tarrytown and Cedar Grove Roads	NY 396 / CR 103 in Coeymans	Part of Cedar Grove Road was once known as Monkey Run Road
CR 303	5.48	8.82	NY 443 in Berne	Pinnacle and Beaver Dam Roads	NY 157 / NY 157A in New Scotland	
CR 306	4.91	7.90	NY 85A in Voorheesville	Voorheesville Avenue and Normans Kill, Krum Kill, and Font Grove Roads	NY 85 in Bethlehem	
CR 307	2.30	3.70	NY 85A	Picard Road in New Scotland	NY 156	CR 307 at the intersection of NY 156
CR 308 (1)	2.35	3.78	NY 32	Unionville – Feura Bush Road in New Scotland	NY 443	
CR 308 (2)	2.40	3.86	NY 443	New Scotland South Road	NY 85	
CR 311	1.68	2.70	NY 157	Beaver Dam Road in New Scotland	CR 303	
CR 312 (1)	5.73	9.22	NY 143 in Westerlo	Clarksville South Road	NY 443 in New Scotland	
CR 312 (2)	0.06	0.10	NY 143	Part of wye connection in Westerlo	CR 312 (segment 1)	

=== Rensselaerville (351–362) ===
Routes numbered 351 through 362 are predominantly in the town of Rensselaerville.

Route	Length (mi)	Length (km)	From	Via	To	Notes
CR 351	6.81	10.96	CR 352	Medusa Road in Rensselaerville	NY 85 / CR 353	
CR 352 (1)	5.83	9.38	NY 145	Fox Creek Road in Rensselaerville	CR 351	
CR 352 (2)	0.05	0.08	NY 145	Part of wye connection in Rensselaerville	CR 352 (segment 1)	
CR 353	4.70	7.56	Schoharie County line (becomes CR 19A)	Delaware Tpke in Rensselaerville	NY 85 at the Tenmile Creek bridge	
CR 354	1.83	2.95	Greene County line (becomes CR 36)	Potter Hollow Road in Rensselaerville	NY 910G	
CR 357	2.28	3.67	CR 352 / CR 360	Fox Creek Road in Rensselaerville	CR 351	
CR 358	4.25	6.84	CR 352	Baitholtz, Cheese Hill, and Kenyon Roads in Rensselaerville	CR 353	
CR 359	1.70	2.74	CR 358	Kropp Road in Rensselaerville	CR 353	
CR 360	3.60	5.79	CR 352 / CR 357	Crow Hill Road in Rensselaerville	CR 359	
CR 361	3.66	5.89	CR 351	Town Line and Albany Hill Roads in Rensselaerville	CR 351	
CR 362	2.09	3.36	Schoharie County line (becomes CR 61)	Scott Patent Road in Rensselaerville	CR 354	

== Routes 401 and up ==
=== Westerlo (401–414) ===
Routes numbered 401 through 414 are predominantly in the town of Westerlo.

Route	Length (mi)	Length (km)	From	Via	To	Notes
CR 401	5.19	8.35	CR 405	Westerlo – South Westerlo Road in Westerlo	NY 143	
CR 401A	0.40	0.64	CR 401	Old CR 401 in Westerlo	CR 401	Unsigned
CR 402 (1)	5.41	8.71	CR 351 in Rensselaerville	Westerlo–Medusa Road	CR 1 in Westerlo	
CR 402 (2)	0.10	0.16	CR 351	North leg of wye connection in Rensselaerville	CR 402 (segment 1)	
CR 403 (1)	6.35	10.22	CR 351 in Rensselaerville	South Westerlo – Medusa Road	CR 405 in Westerlo	
CR 403 (2)	0.37	0.60	CR 403 (segment 1)	Marks Road in Rensselaerville	Greene County line (becomes CR 75)	
CR 404	4.44	7.15	CR 402	Bear Swamp Road in Westerlo	NY 32	
CR 405	5.40	8.69	CR 402	Sunset Hill Road in Westerlo	Greene County line (becomes CR 38)	
CR 406	1.95	3.14	CR 401	Kuster Road in Westerlo	NY 32	
CR 408	5.93	9.54	CR 402 in Westerlo	Fancher Road	CR 1 in Berne	
CR 409	2.15	3.46	Greene County line (becomes CR 50)	McNaughtons Road in Westerlo	CR 405	
CR 410	2.21	3.56	CR 402	Thayers Corners Road in Westerlo	CR 401	
CR 411 (1)	4.57	7.35	Greene County line	Newry Road in Westerlo	NY 32 / NY 143	
CR 411 (2)	0.96	1.54	NY 32 / NY 143	Newry Road in Westerlo	CR 312	
CR 412	5.37	8.64	NY 143 in Westerlo	Airport Road	CR 11 in Berne	
CR 413	5.73	9.22	CR 361	Upper and Lower Chapel Hill Roads in Westerlo	CR 402	
CR 414	1.22	1.96	CR 405	Horseshoe Bend Road in Westerlo	CR 401	

== See also ==
- County routes in New York
