= New York State Route 85 =

State highway in Albany County, New York, US

New York State Route 85
- NY 85 highlighted in red, and former alignments maintained as reference routes in pink

Route information
- Maintained by NYSDOT
- Length: 26.49 mi (42.63 km)
- Existed: 1930–present

Major junctions
- West end: CR 351 / CR 353 in Rensselaerville
- NY 443 in New Scotland
- East end: I-90 in Albany

Location
- Country: United States
- State: New York
- Counties: Albany

Highway system
- New York Highways; Interstate; US; State; Reference; Parkways
← NY 84	→ NY 85A

New York State Route 85 (NY 85) is a state highway in Albany County, New York, in the United States. It is 26.49 miles (42.63 km) in length and runs from CR 353 in Rensselaerville to Interstate 90 (I-90) exit 4 in Albany. It also has a loop route, NY 85A, which connects NY 85 to the village of Voorheesville. The portion of NY 85 north of NY 140 to the Bethlehem–Albany town/city line is known as the Slingerlands Bypass. From there north to I-90, the road is a four-lane freeway named the Crosstown Arterial.

== Route description ==
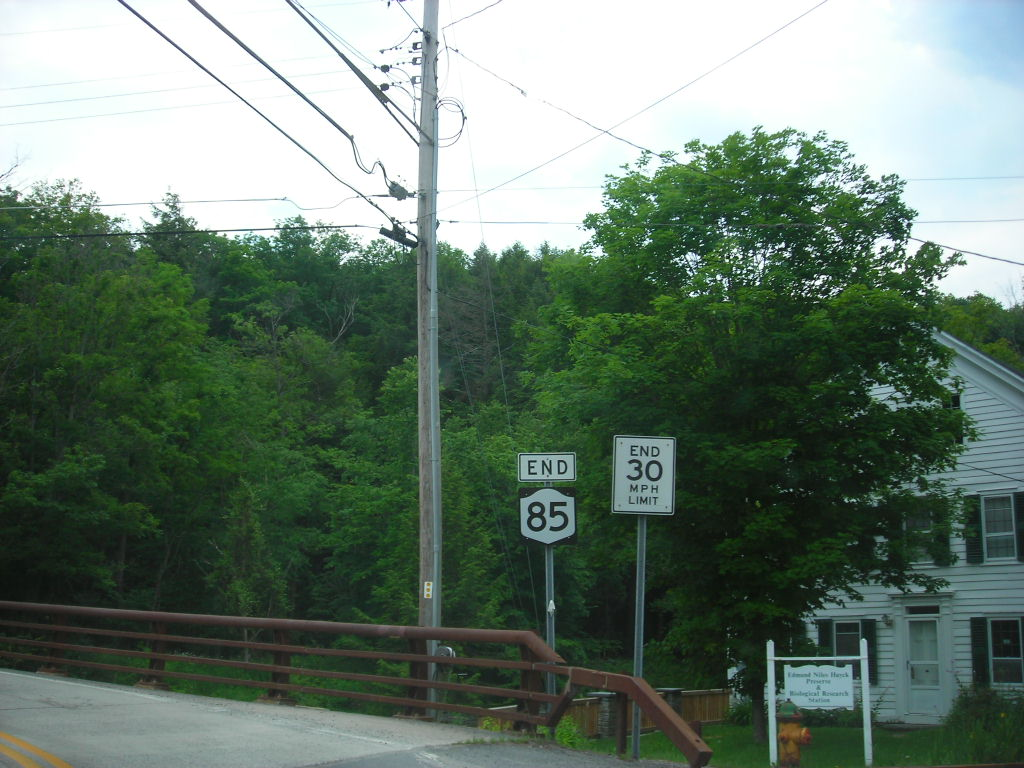
NY 85 at the Ten Mile Creek Bridge in Rensselaerville, approaching its western terminus

NY 85 begins at the north end of the County Route 353 (CR 353; Delaware Turnpike) bridge over the Ten Mile Creek in the hamlet of Rensselaerville. In the center of the hamlet, NY 85 turns north at the intersection with CR 351 (Medusa Road), NY 85 proceeds northward along Delaware Turnpike, a two-lane residential street through the town of Rensselaerville. The route soon becomes a woods road, turning east and passing the southern terminus of CR 6. NY 85 bends northeast through Rensselaerville, crossing through valleys until Stevens Road, where it bends southeast and soon east into the town of Westerlo. Still known as Delaware Turnpike, NY 85 continues east through the valleys past a junction with CR 408.

East of CR 408, NY 85 winds south of Onderdonk Lake, soon crossing a junction with CR 1 (Switzkill Road). Bending northward through Westerlo, NY 85 remains a two-lane rural road, soon reaching a junction with the western terminus of NY 143. NY 85 continues northeast from NY 143, becoming more residential as it approaches a junction with CR 14 (Joslyn School Road). Crossing into the town of Berne, NY 85 meets a junction with CR 11 (Cass Hill Road) west of the hamlet of Reidsville. The route then bends northward at this junction, bypassing the hamlet and soon reaching the northern terminus of CR 11 (North Road) nearby.

After CR 11, NY 85 continues northward through Berne, bending northeast into a junction with NY 443 (Helderberg Trail). NY 443 and NY 85 become concurrent, proceeding eastward and south of Helderberg Lake as Delaware Turnpike. NY 85 and NY 443 continue winding eastward, crossing into the town of New Scotland, crossing through the Letter-S, a hill named for a former S-bend alignment of NY 85 that is preserved in two town roads of similar names. Climbing down the hill, the routes bend southward, reaching a junction with New Scotland Road. At this junction, NY 443 continues southeast on Delaware Turnpike while NY 85 turns east on New Scotland. Still a two-lane road through New Scotland, NY 85 passes multiple residences before making a large curve to the north.

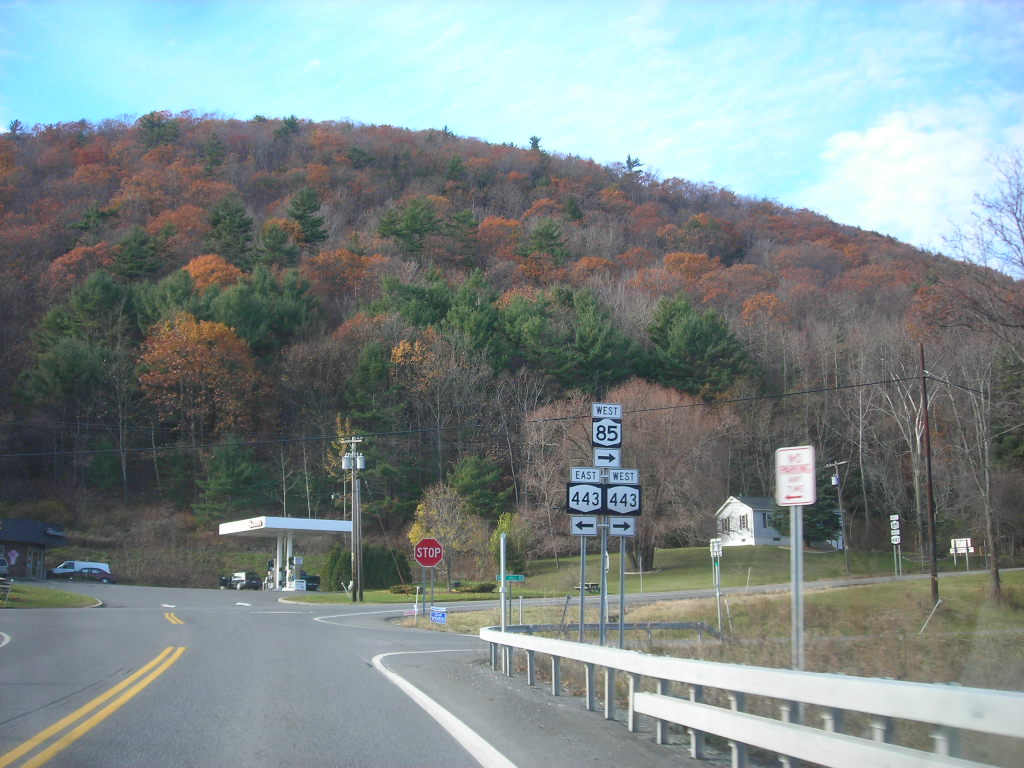
NY 85 at NY 443 in New Scotland

The route bends northeast and enters the area of New Salem Hill, where it intersects with the eastern terminus of NY 157 (Thacher Park Road). Continuing north, NY 85 soon bends southeast and enters the hamlet of New Salem, where it intersects with the western terminus of NY 85A (New Salem Road). Through New Salem, NY 85 is a two-lane residential street, soon leaving the hamlet after Mountain View Estates Road. Running northeast through New Scotland, NY 85 remains a two-lane residential street, crossing under CSX railroad tracks before reaching the hamlet of New Scotland. The route runs northeast through the hamlet, becoming a two-lane residential/commercial street and intersects with CR 308 (New Scotland South Road).

NY 85 quickly crosses the eastern terminus of NY 85A (Maple Road), bending southeast through New Scotland. Leaving the namesake hamlet, NY 85 continues southeast until reaching the town of Bethlehem. Through Bethlehem, NY 85 reaches the hamlet of Slingerlands, becoming a two-lane residential street and crossing the eastern terminus of CR 306 (Font Grove Road). Passing a junction with Kenwood Avenue, NY 85 crosses through the commercial center of Slingerlands, soon turning northeast into another residential portion of Slingerlands. Near the northern end of the hamlet, the route enters a roundabout with NY 140 (Cherry Avenue Extension) and New Scotland Road (former NY 910E).

NY 85 turns northwest at the roundabout, bending into another one with Vista Boulevard. Continuing northeast, NY 85 reaches a third roundabout with Maher Road (former NY 915L), which connects to New Scotland Road and the hamlet of Karlsfeld. After crossing another roundabout, this time with Blessing Road, NY 85 becomes a two-lane freeway and crosses through the Normanskill section of Bethlehem, crossing over the New York State Thruway (I-87). Just after the overpass, NY 85 widens from a two-lane freeway to a four-lane freeway, crossing into the city of Albany and passing a ramp for Krumkill Road. Crossing over Buckingham Road, NY 85 interchanges with the local street, soon reaching an interchange with Cortland Street, which connects to US 20 (Western Avenue).

Almost immediately after US 20, NY 85 continues past another interchange, serving Washington Avenue and the W. Averell Harriman State Office Building Campus. Just north of this interchange, Route 85 ends at trumpet interchange with I-90.

== History ==
=== Origins ===
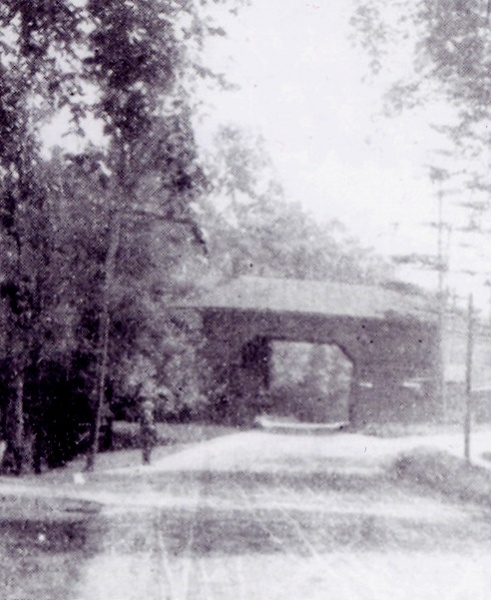
View of the tollgate in Slingerlands. It was demolished in 1908.

The path of modern NY 85 west of Slingerlands roughly follows that of the Albany, Rensselaerville, and Schoharie Plank Road, a plank road established to connect the city of Albany with the town of Schoharie by way of passing through Rensselaerville. The Albany, Schoharie, and Rensselaerville Plank Road Company was organized on October 10, 1849, with Lansing Pruyn as president. On March 25, 1850, the company was given a 30-year charter; and the road from Lydius Street in Albany (today Madison Avenue) to the hamlet of New Salem—now New Scotland Avenue in the city of Albany and New Scotland Road in Bethlehem and New Scotland—and the portion of the road from Bernville to Gallupville were planked with wooden boards. Portions of the plank road were already long established roads, such as the Beaverdam (or Beaver Dam) Road in western Albany County near New Salem, which had already existed for quite some time prior to moving to an easier grade around New Salem in 1806. The plank road/turnpike spurred the development of many places along its path, such as a hotel at what would evolve into the hamlet of Hurstville and a post office at what would become the hamlet of Slingerlands.

In 1854 the state authorized the fiscally unsound plank road company to abandon or sell portions of the road and to turn other sections into a turnpike and charge tolls. The section from New Salem east to the hamlet of New Scotland subsequently had its planks removed and the portion from Bernville to Gallupville was also abandoned. In 1881 the charter was renewed for another 30 years. In 1896 the turnpike company opposed the construction of a railroad that would have been in direct competition to the turnpike from Albany to Schoharie.

=== Designation ===
In 1908, the New York State Legislature created Route 7, an unsigned legislative route extending from Binghamton to Albany via Oneonta and Schoharie. Route 7 entered the town of New Scotland on what is now NY 157 and followed it to its eastern end at modern NY 85. At this point, the route turned onto the old Albany–Schoharie plank road and continued east to Albany on New Scotland Road and New Scotland Avenue. The section of legislative Route 7 east of modern NY 157 was not assigned a posted designation until the 1930 renumbering of state highways in New York when it became part of NY 85, which initially extended from NY 81 in the hamlet of Oak Hill in the town of Durham to US 20 in Albany.

When it was first assigned, the route followed Makley and Siebert Roads north from Oak Hill to Medusa, then continued northeast to Westerlo on CR 351, CR 402, CR 404, and CR 401. Past Westerlo, NY 85 was routed on what is now NY 143 to the Delaware Turnpike near Reidsville, where it joined its current alignment. Northeast of Slingerlands, NY 85 followed New Scotland Avenue into downtown Albany, where it terminated at US 20. The portion of the route between Medusa and Reidsville was realigned c. 1936 to serve the hamlet of Rensselaerville. Instead of heading east from Medusa, NY 85 was rerouted to follow CR 352, CR 360, CR 359, and CR 353 north to Rensselaerville, where it met its modern routing. NY 85 was truncated to Rensselaerville c. 1938.

Construction on the Slingerlands Bypass, a new highway bypassing the hamlet of Slingerlands, began in the early 1960s. The first section of the bypass from Washington Avenue to Buckingham Drive (the Krumkill Road exit) was completed by 1964. The remainder of the highway was open by 1968 as a realignment of NY 85. Between Blessing Road and the Albany city line, the bypass was constructed as a two-lane highway. This section was originally planned to be four lanes wide as well, but was constructed with only two lanes due to community activism by an anti-sprawl group known as the Bethlehem Lincoln Republicans in the early 1960s. The old alignment of NY 85 along New Scotland Road from where NY 85 turns onto the bypass to the Albany city line (a distance of 0.38 miles or 0.61 kilometres as of 2008) was designated as NY 910E, an unsigned reference route.

A four-lane extension of the bypass was constructed in 2007 between NY 140 and Maher Road. Four roundabouts were built, the southernmost where NY 85 currently meets NY 140 at Cherry Avenue Extension. After the roadway opened to traffic on November 7, 2007, NY 85 was rerouted onto the newly constructed portion of the bypass while the section of New Scotland Road between NY 140 and Maher Road became part of an extended NY 910E. The new highway, four lanes divided, meets the existing highway portion of the bypass at the same Maher Road (NY 915L), at the third roundabout. Between 2017 and 2018, NY 910E and NY 915L were decommissioned.

NY 85 was once proposed to be extended to the unbuilt I-687.

== Major intersections ==
The entire route is in Albany County.

Location	mi	km	Destinations	Notes
Rensselaerville	0.00	0.00	CR 351 south / CR 353 west (Delaware Turnpike)	Western terminus; northern terminus of CR 351; eastern terminus of CR 353
Westerlo	6.51	10.48	NY 143 east – Westerlo	Western terminus of NY 143
Berne	10.18	16.38	NY 443 west – Berne	Western end of NY 443 concurrency
New Scotland	12.20	19.63	NY 443 east – Clarksville	Eastern end of NY 443 concurrency
New Scotland	14.43	23.22	NY 157 west – Thacher Park	Eastern terminus of NY 157
New Scotland	15.33	24.67	NY 85A east – Voorheesville	Western terminus of NY 85A; hamlet of New Salem
New Scotland	18.89	30.40	NY 85A west – Voorheesville	Eastern terminus of NY 85A
Bethlehem	21.69	34.91	NY 140 east / New Scotland Road – Delmar	Roundabout; western terminus of NY 140; hamlet of Slingerlands
Bethlehem	22.22	35.76	Maher Road	Roundabout; former routing of NY 85
Bethlehem			Western end of freeway section	
Albany	24.55	39.51	Krumkill Road	Diamond interchange
Albany	25.33	40.76	To US 20 (Western Avenue)	Access via Daytona Avenue/Ormond Street; serves former College of Saint Rose campus
Albany	25.37	40.83	State Offices	Access via Campus Access Road
Albany	26.05	41.92	Lincoln Avenue	Eastbound exit and entrance
Albany	26.05	41.92	To Washington Avenue – State Offices	Westbound exit and entrance; access via Campus Access Road
Albany	26.49	42.63	I-90 to New York Thruway (I-87 Toll) – Buffalo, Boston	Eastern terminus; exit 4 on I-90
1.000 mi = 1.609 km; 1.000 km = 0.621 mi: Concurrency terminus; Incomplete access

== Suffixed Route ==

NY 85A (5.54 miles or 8.92 kilometres) is an alternate route of NY 85 in New Scotland, accessing Voorheesville. It was assigned c. 1932.

Major intersections

The entire route is in Albany County.

Location	mi	km	Destinations	Notes
New Salem	0.00	0.00	NY 85 – Thacher Park	Western terminus
Voorheesville	3.11	5.01	NY 156 west – Altamont	Eastern terminus of NY 156
Voorheesville	3.78	6.08	NY 155 east – Colonie	Traffic circle; western terminus of NY 155
New Scotland	5.59	9.00	NY 85 – Slingerlands, New Salem	Eastern terminus
1.000 mi = 1.609 km; 1.000 km = 0.621 mi
