= Interstate 687 =

Unbuilt highway in New York

Interstate 687
- Albany Airport Connector
- Proposed I-687 corridor highlighted in red

Route information
- Auxiliary route of I-87
- Length: 9.10 mi (14.65 km)
- History: Proposed in 1950s; canceled in 1973
- NHS: Entire route

Major junctions
- West end: I-90 / New York Thruway in Colonie
- NY 5 in Colonie; NY 155 in Colonie; I-88 / NY 7 in Colonie; I-87 in Colonie; NY 85 in Colonie
- East end: I-90 in Albany

Location
- Country: United States
- State: New York
- Counties: Albany

Highway system
- Interstate Highway System; Main; Auxiliary; Suffixed; Business; Future; New York Highways; Interstate; US; State; Reference; Parkways
← I-684	→ I-690

Interstate 687 (I-687) was a proposed auxiliary Interstate Highway in the Capital District region of New York in the United States. The highway would have connected I-90 in to I-87 and Albany International Airport in Colonie. I-687 faced opposition from those living in the path of the highway, and ultimately all that was built of the highway was its interchange with I-90 in Albany, which now connects to a surface road, Corporate Woods Boulevard. The project was canceled in 1973, and I-687 was removed from the Interstate Highway System four years later. A small portion of what would have been I-687 is now used as a connector between the Adirondack Northway and Albany International Airport; it, however, does not have a route designation and was completed as its own separate project in November 2019.

== Route description ==
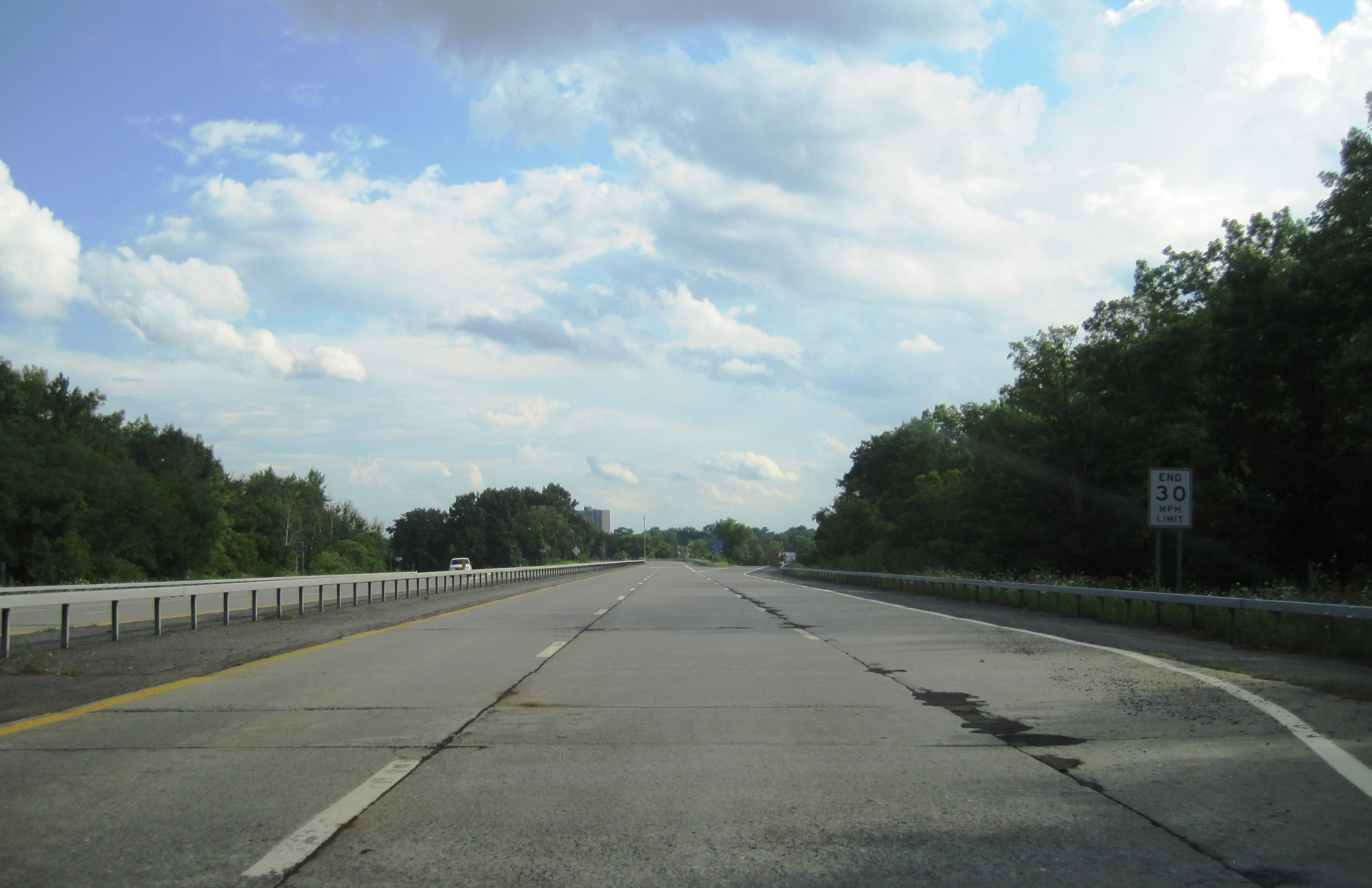
Onramps onto I-90 at exit 5A in Colonie. This would have been the eastern terminus of I-687.

I-687 was to begin between exits 24 and 25 on the New York State Thruway. It would continue north to a diamond intersection with New York State Route 5 (NY 5; Central Avenue). It would then proceed north and east to an exit with NY 155, and farther to an interchange with I-88, via a connector running on the west side of the airport. I-687 would then have an entrance to Albany International Airport, the main reason for its existence. Continuing east, I-687 would then have a cloverleaf interchange with I-87 (Adirondack Northway). Continuing east, I-687 would enter an interchange with a proposed northward extension of NY 85 (Crosstown Arterial), serving as the northern terminus of NY 85. The highway would then curve southeast into a diamond interchange with Osborne Road. After one final interchange with Everett Road, I-687 would end at exit 5A on I-90, now not associated with the thruway. This would also include an entrance and exit to North Manning Boulevard, for direct access to downtown Albany. The highway would have been 9.10 miles (14.65 km) long.

== History ==
The initial plans for the Capital District's portion of the Interstate Highway System were drawn up in the late 1950s. One of the highways proposed at this time was I-687, also known as the "Northway Connection". When the Adirondack Northway (I-87) was completed through Colonie in 1960, a gap was left in I-87's exit numbering system for an interchange with I-687. The exits with NY 5 (Central Avenue) and Albany Shaker Road were designated as exits 2 and 4, respectively, leaving exit 3 for I-687. No such gap was left on the toll-free section of I-90, where the I-687 exit was numbered exit 5A.

The construction of I-687 would have forced hundreds of households from their homes, most of which are located off of Albany Shaker Road (NY 155 east of I-87). By way of comparison, today's Crossing Park in Colonie would have been directly in the path of the highway. As such, the project faced opposition from residents of the town of Colonie. The construction of the road was started despite the controversy surrounding it, and the interchange with I-90 was completed c. 1972. Construction was halted soon afterward, however, as state and federal funds were diverted away from the project. I-687 and the proposed northward extension of the Crosstown Arterial (NY 85) were both canceled by the state of New York in late September 1973, at which time the New York State Department of Transportation (NYSDOT) requested that I-687 be removed from the Interstate Highway System. The request was granted in 1977.

I-90 exit 5A, the only part of the project that was ever constructed, was left as an interchange to nowhere for roughly a decade. The North Manning Boulevard connection was never built. In the early 1980s, the large, freeway-standard trumpet interchange was linked up with Corporate Woods Boulevard, a local, two-lane street leading to an office park located just north of I-90 on Albany Shaker Road. NYSDOT reconfigured the exit 4 and 5 ramps, which helped relieve traffic congestion in this area. On July 9, 2019, it was announced that the new airport connector will become exit 3. Exit 3 gives access to Albany International Airport, exit 4 gives access to Wolf Road, and the exit 5 ramp southbound was realigned to meet directly with I-87, instead of through the conjoined frontage road. Exit 4 will be relocated and will become an access exit to Albany Shaker Road and Albany International Airport.

== Current form ==
While the idea for I-687 is basically dead as of the end of 2019 with only an interchange to nowhere at exit 5A on I-90 built, a new exit 3 flyover ramp from I-87 (Adirondack Northway) to NY 155 (Albany Shaker Road) called the Albany Airport Connector is currently in use where I-687 would have been built, providing an easier connection between I-87 and the airport. The connector was completed in November 2019.

== Exit list ==
=== Current ===
The entire route is in Colonie, Albany County.

mi	km	Exit	Destinations	Notes
0.40	0.64	-	NY 155 (Albany Shaker Road) – Albany International Airport, Colonie	At-grade intersection
0.00	0.00	–	I-87 – New York City, Montreal	Exit 3 on I-87 (Adirondack Northway); construction started December 2018; completed November 2019
1.000 mi = 1.609 km; 1.000 km = 0.621 mi

=== Original proposal ===
The original proposal would have had the ten following exits. The entire route is in Albany County.

Location	mi	km	Exit	Destinations	Notes
Colonie	0.0	0.0	—	I-90 / New York Thruway to I-88 west – Boston, Buffalo	Western terminus; proposed exit 25 on the Thruway
Colonie	1.60	2.57	1	NY 5 (Central Avenue) – Colonie, Schenectady	
Colonie	2.5	4.0	2	NY 155 (New Karner Road) – Colonie	
Colonie	4.3	6.9	3	I-88 / NY 7 – Troy, Binghamton, Bennington, VT	Connector to proposed extension of I-88 along NY 7
Colonie	4.8	7.7	4	NY 155 (Albany Shaker Road) – Albany International Airport, Colonie	Proposed expanded entrance to the airport
Colonie	5.7	9.2	5	I-87 (Adirondack Northway) – New York City, Montreal	Would be signed as exits 5A (south) and 5B (north); proposed exit 3 on I-87
Colonie	5.8	9.3	6	Wolf Road to NY 155 – Colonie	Westbound exit and eastbound entrance
Colonie	6.6	10.6	7	NY 85 (Crosstown Arterial) – Slingerlands, New Scotland, New Salem	Connection to proposed extension of NY 85
Colonie	7.5	12.1	8	Osborne Road – Colonie	
Colonie	8.3	13.4	9	Everett Road – Colonie	
Albany	9.1	14.6	10	North Manning Boulevard – Downtown Albany	Would have been part of I-90 interchange
Albany	9.1	14.6	—	I-90 – Boston, Buffalo	Proposed exit 5A on I-90
1.000 mi = 1.609 km; 1.000 km = 0.621 mi: Incomplete access; Tolled
