= Streets of Albany, New York =

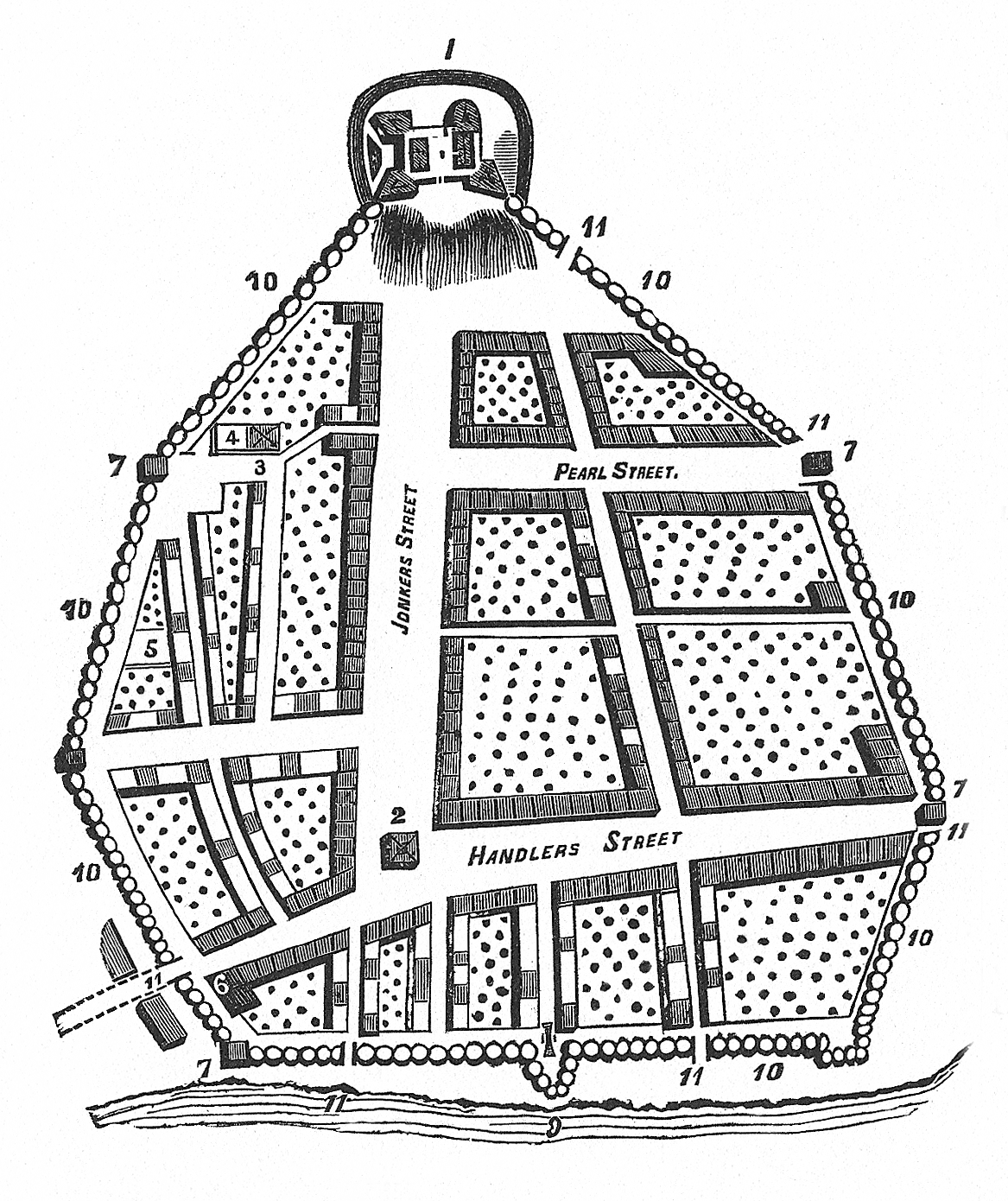
Map of Albany in 1695. North is to right.

The streets of Albany, New York, have had a long history going back almost 400 years. Many of the streets have changed names over the course of time, some have changed names many times. Some streets no longer exist, others have changed course. Some roads existed only on paper. The oldest streets were haphazardly laid out with no overall plan until Simeon De Witt's 1794 street grid plan. The plan had two grids, one west of Eagle Street and the old stockade, and another for the Pastures District south of the old stockade.

== Early colonial streets ==
These streets had their starts during the Dutch colonial era in the 17th century, some such as Broadway, State, and Pearl streets grew and continued to stretch out into the countryside, while some such as Van Tromp are short stubby streets one block long. Others are so narrow that today they are blocked off to vehicular traffic.

=== State Street ===
Two views of State Street looking east,
200 years apart one block from each other.

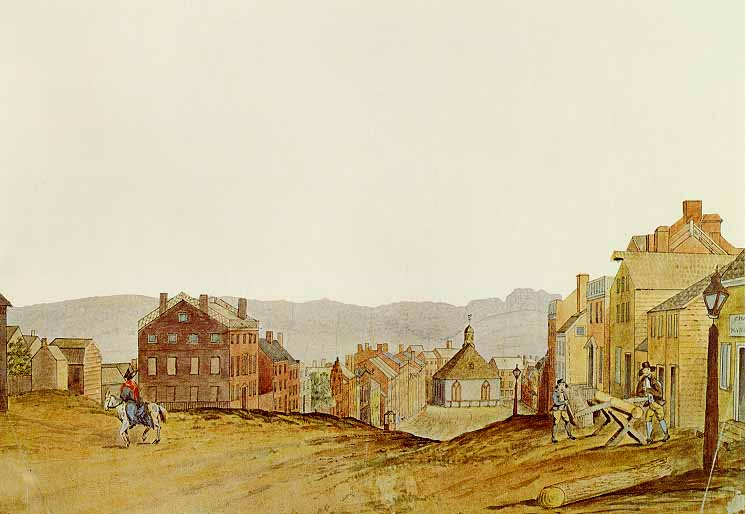
State Street in 1805 looking east from Eagle Street

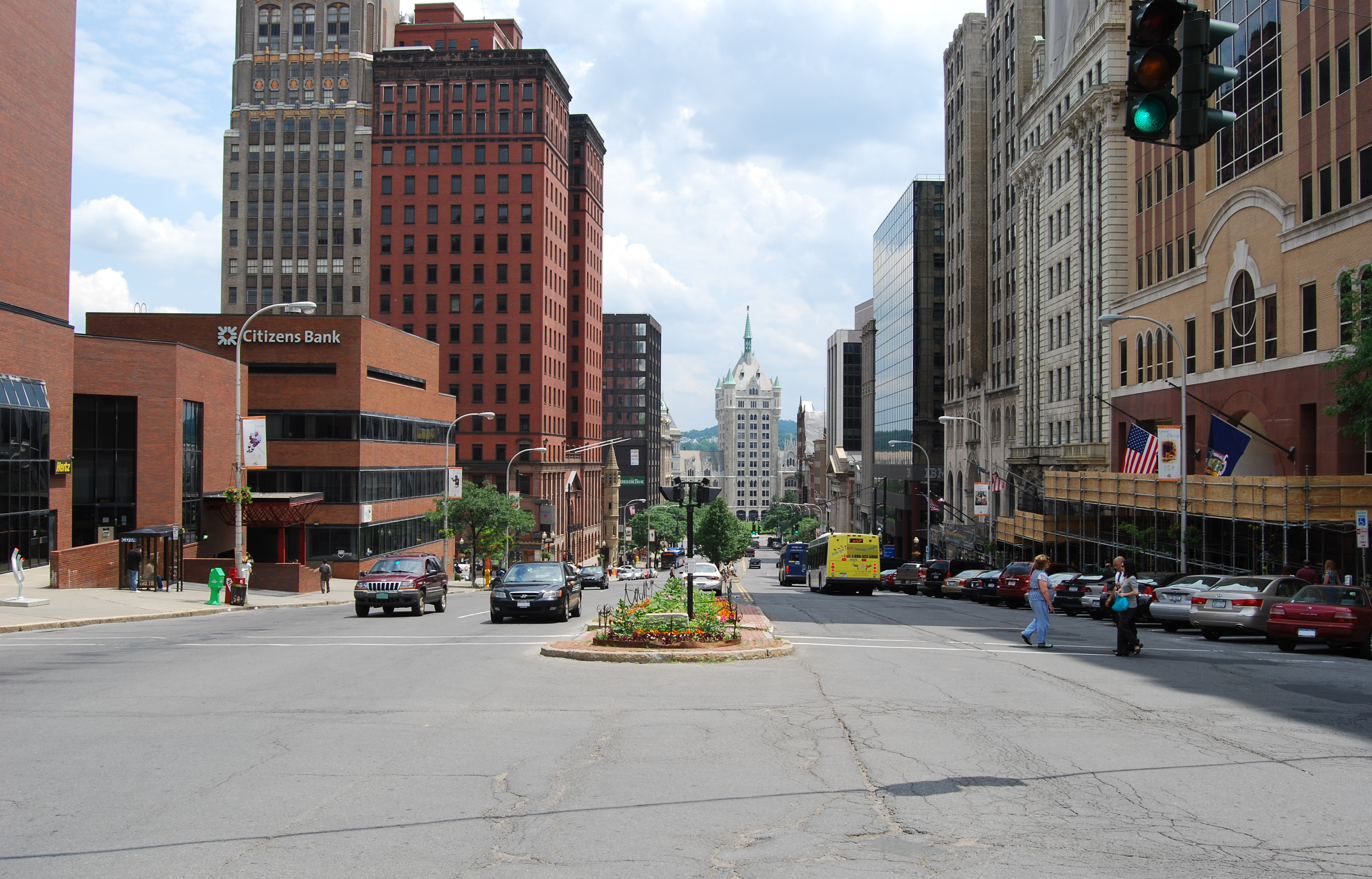
State Street in 2009 looking east from Lodge Street

Albany's original "main street". The original name was Yonker Street; it and Broadway are the two oldest streets in Albany. Three structures sat in the middle of the street; from east to west they were: the original Dutch Reformed church, St. Peter's Anglican Church, and Fort Frederick; by 1810 they had been demolished. State Street west of Eagle Street was called Deer Street; today it is sometimes referred to as "upper" State Street to distinguish it from the older "lower" State Street. "Upper" State Street is a one-way street traveling east and goes from a Y-intersection with Western Avenue and continues east to Eagle Street. There are two other discontinuous sections of State Street; one is blocked from "upper" State Street by the downtown campus of the University at Albany, SUNY (SUNY Albany) and is a one-way street traveling west from Cortland Place to O'Leary Boulevard (Partridge Street) then is blocked by the downtown dorms of SUNY Albany, Albany High School, and St. Mary's Park. The next section goes from North Main to North Pine streets. State Street from Broadway to Eagle Street is part of New York Route 5, though this is an unsigned part of the route.

=== Broadway ===
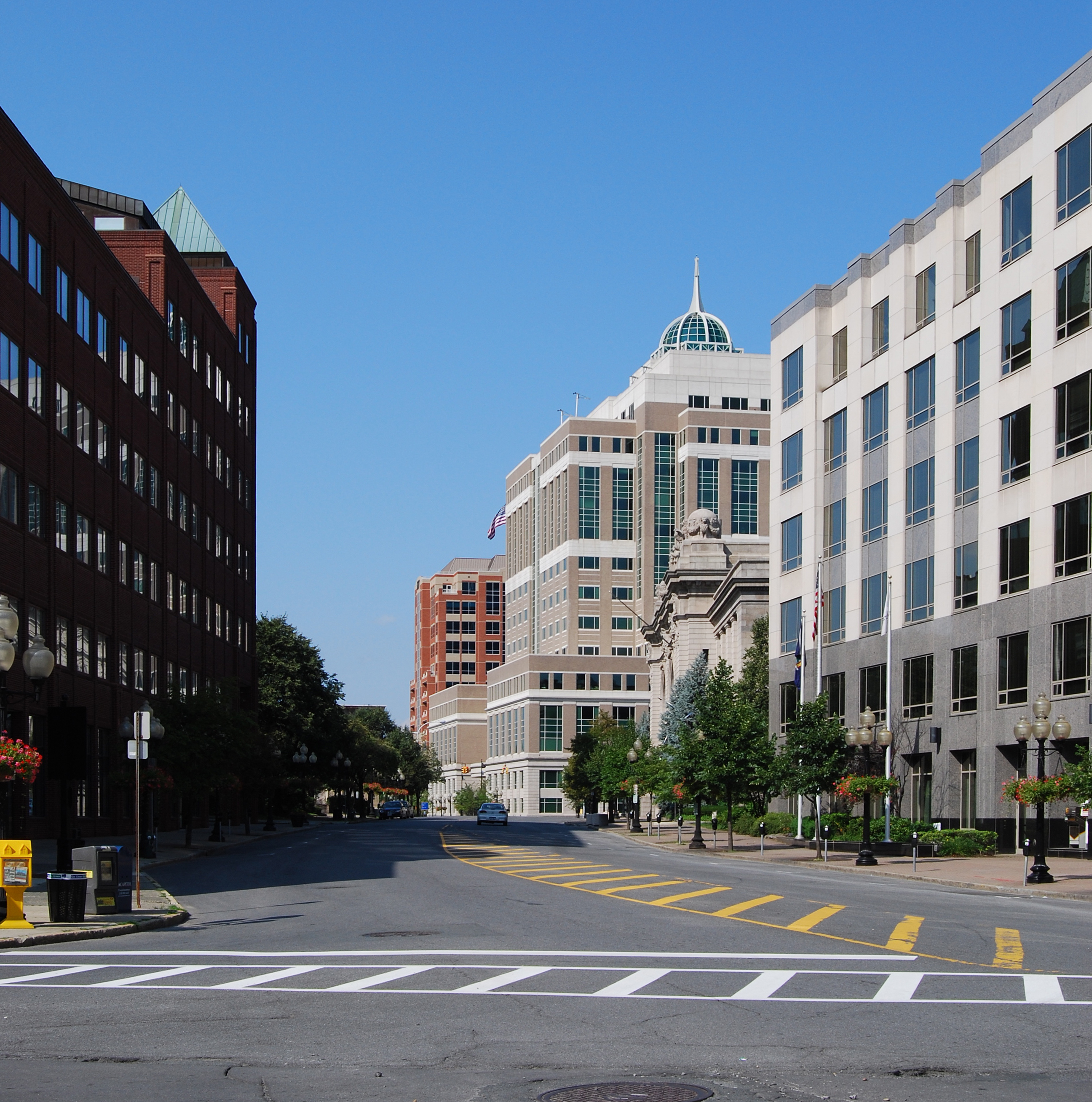
Broadway

Called Handalaers Street on the Miller map of 1695. One of the original streets within the Dutch stockade, it and State Street are the two oldest streets in Albany. The intersection with Yonker (State) Street is where the original Dutch Church sat until 1806. North of State Street it became known as Market Street. The second oldest house in Albany, the Quackenbush House was built along Broadway. Handalaers Street was changed to Market Street, and then in 1815 Court Street became South Market and Market became North Market. Broadway from Madison Avenue north out of the city was once New York Route 2 until the 1980s. The only portion of Broadway within the city of Albany that is part of a state or US route is a small section from State Street south to Hamilton Street is part of New York Route 5, though unsigned as such.

=== Pearl Street ===
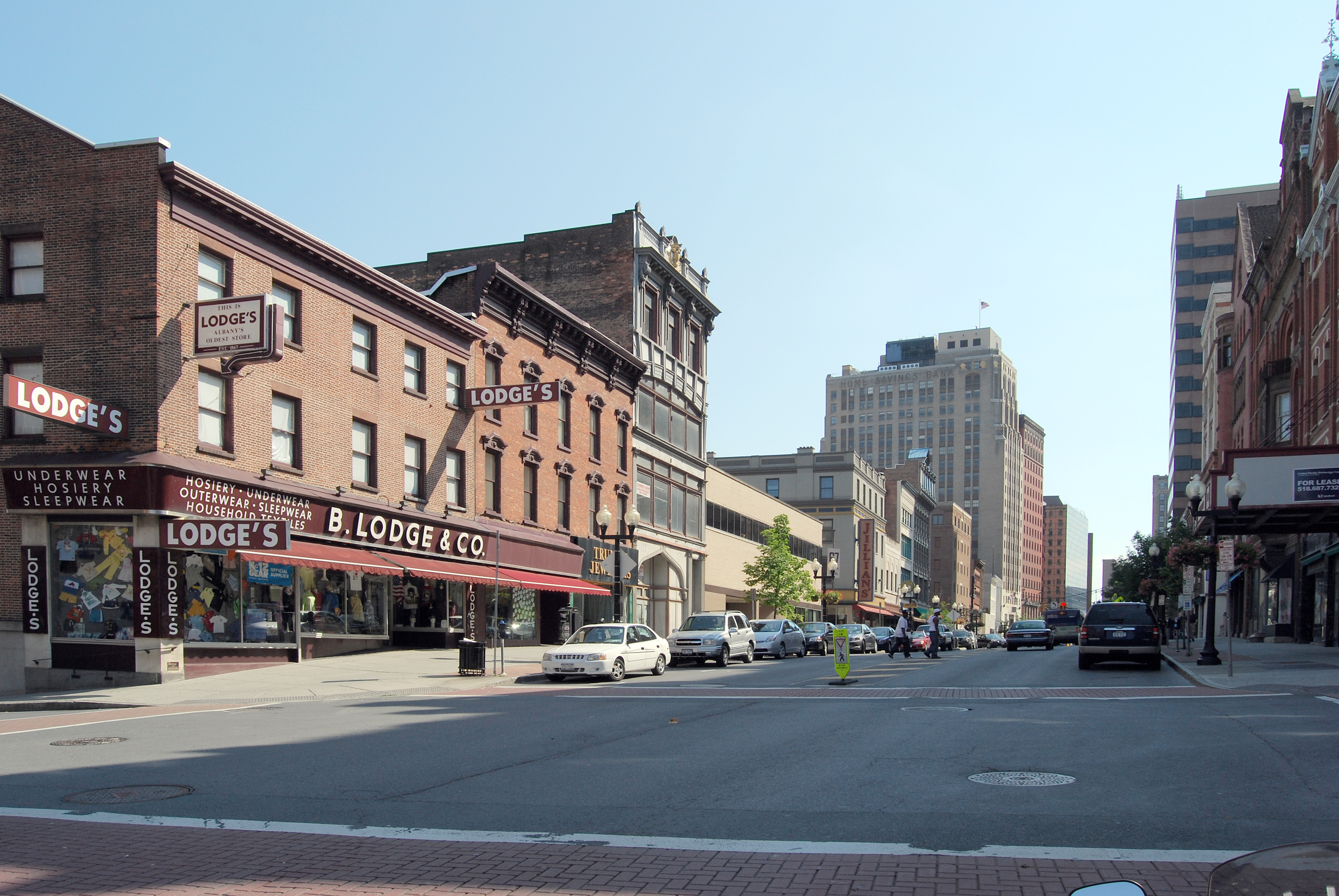
North Pearl Street

Another early Dutch street today it is part of NY Route 32 (NY 32) and is a core of downtown Albany, lined with bars, nightclubs, and entertainment venues such as the Times Union Center, the Palace Theatre, and the Capital Repertory Theatre. The intersection with State Street was once called Elm Street Corner, where stood an Elm Tree planted by Philip Livingston, a signer of the Declaration of Independence. South of State Street the road was a path to the common pastures owned by the Dutch Church, it was one of many such paths referred to as "Cow Lane". After the Revolution it was named Washington Street in honor of George Washington. In 1814/15 Pearl Street north of State was renamed North Pearl while the street south of State was renamed South Pearl. In 1804 the Albany and Bethlehem Turnpike was chartered and constructed as a continuation of South Pearl Street through the hamlet of Kenwood to the hamlet of Bethlehem Center. In 1870 a portion of Kenwood was annexed to Albany and the city was involved in a lawsuit (Harriet M. Elmendorf v. The City of Albany) over its right to lay sidewalks along the turnpike (technically private property) and to levy an assessment upon property in order to cover the cost of the sidewalk.

The entire length of Pearl Street was part of NY 32 until the 1960s, today going north NY 32 leaves South Pearl Street at Interstate 787 (I-787) and returns to South Pearl at the intersection with Rensselaer and Morton streets.

=== Hudson Avenue ===
Originally called Hudson Street it laid along the southern edge of the stockade, the oldest building in Albany is at 48 Hudson Avenue and built at a time when Hudson Street was little more than a path along the outside of the stockade. Over time it was continued west as far as Washington Park. On the other side of Washington Park, Hudson Street started again along the same line. When the Nelson A. Rockefeller Empire State Plaza was built a large section of Hudson Avenue disappeared. Today Hudson Ave is split into four sections. Hudson Ave exists from Broadway until South Pearl Street where the South Mall Arterial and Empire State Plaza covers its route, then again from Swan Street to Willett Street where Washington Park stands in the way, then South Lake to Partridge where the College of Saint Rose sits, and then Hudson Ave continues from Main to Allen.

=== Maiden Lane and Pine Street ===
Maiden Lane and Pine Street are two parallel streets with an entwined history. Maiden Lane is the older of the two, it was one of the original streets within the stockade and was called Rom Street. Being one block north of State Street it was often used as a service road for the buildings fronting on the north side of State. Maiden Lane ran from Fort Albany and western edge of the stockade east to the Hudson River, where there was a ferry that crossed to the other side of the river. After Fort Albany and the stockade were removed Maiden Lane was extended west as far as Eagle Street where it met the Kings Highway from Schenectady (today Washington Avenue).

Pine Street was originally a short two block street running west from Barrack Street (now Chapel) to the stockade and later as far as the Public Square (today Eagle Street). A proposal in 1831 to extend Pine from Chapel east to Broadway at a cost of $45–60,000 was defeated. In the 1970s an urban renewal project called the Hotel Ten Eyck Project destroyed Maiden Lane between Chapel and North Pearl streets, while Pine Street was finally extended east from Chapel to Broadway to take up the traffic that could no longer use Maiden Lane.

Maiden Lane between Eagle and Chapel streets has since been renamed Corning Place in honor of Mayor Erastus Corning 2nd, and the section between North Pearl and James streets is the only section named Maiden still open to vehicular traffic, the rest of the remaining sections being turned into a pedestrian mall. The Hudson River Way pedestrian bridge over Interstate 787 goes from where Maiden Lane meets Broadway and allows for access to the Corning Preserve and Hudson River.

=== Clinton Avenue ===
Formerly Patroon Street, named for being the dividing line of the city of Albany to the south and the patroonship of the Van Rensselaers to the north per the Dongan Charter. It was renamed in honor of DeWitt Clinton as Clinton Avenue.

== De Witt streets ==
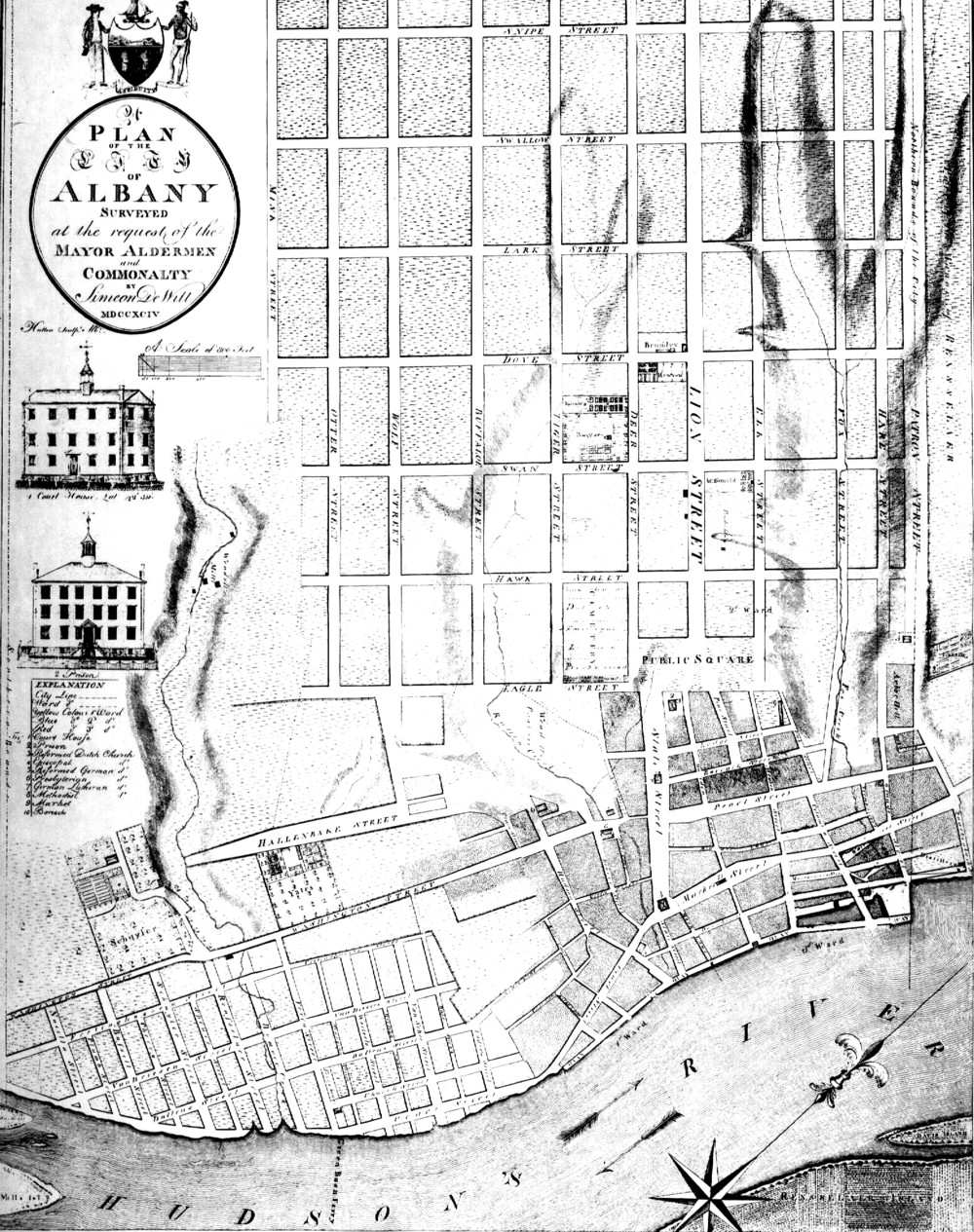
Simeon De Witt's 1794 grid plan for Albany, north is to the right.

In the 1790s Simeon De Witt made a grid plan for future streets in Albany, one grid for west of Eagle Street and one grid for the Pastures. West of Eagle Street the east–west streets were named for mammals while the north–south streets were named for birds. The bird names were, in order from east to west- Eagle, Hawk, Swan, Dove, Lark, Swallow (Knox and Henry Johnson Boulevard), Snipe (Lexington Avenue, portion of New Scotland Avenue), Duck (now Robin), Pigeon (now Lake Avenue), Turkey (Quail), Sparrow (Ontario), and Partridge. The mammal streets were, in order from north to south- Hare (Orange), Fox (Sheridan Avenue), Elk, Lion (Washington Avenue), Deer (State), Tiger (Lancaster), Buffaloe [sic] (Hudson Avenue), Wolf (Madison Avenue), Otter (Elm), and Mink (Myrtle). Many of these streets were not brand new though the names were. Prior to the 1790s- Eagle was Duke, Swan was Boscawen, Dove was Warren, Lark was Johnson, Swallow was Gage, Snipe was Schenectady, Duck was Schoharie, Hare was Wall, Fox was Howe, Lion was King, "upper" State was Prince, Tiger was Prideaux, Buffalo was Quiter (Native American name given to Albany's first mayor), Otter was Pitt, and Mink was Monckton.

With the exception of Elk Street all the mammal names were changed over time. Many of the mammal streets changed names to that of the older downtown streets as they were later connected, such as Buffaloe Street changing to Hudson (Street) Avenue, and Deer Street changing to State Street. A few of the bird streets were changed as well, such as Snipe to Lexington Avenue and Swallow to Knox; while some bird-named streets simply changed to a more respected bird; such as Duck to Robin and Turkey to Quail. Because of ravines, swamps, and other undesirable building ground some of the streets were not opened over their entire planned length, leading to large gaps in street numbering. Some of the undesirable land would in time be taken by parks or large institutions, forever splitting some streets into two, three, or even four parts.

=== Madison Avenue ===
Madison Ave was originally two separate streets in the De Witt plan, Lydius Street in the Pastures from the Hudson River to Dallius Street (Dongan Street), and named Wolf Street west from Eagle Street. As time went on and Lydius Street headed uphill from South Pearl that section came to be called "Lydius continued". Wolf Street would change to Lydius when the roads were connected at Eagle. What is now Madison Place was called Madison Avenue, Lydius would take the name Madison Ave and Madison Place would get its current name. In 1864 the state of New York passed Laws of 1864 Chapter 434, entitled AN ACT to amend an act entitled "An act to form a separate road district of all that part of the city of Albany lying west of Allen street, and to exempt the same from certain taxes.", banned the city from improving, grading, or opening Madison Ave west from Allen Street to Magazine Street. Allen Street continues to be the western termination of Madison Ave, the street never being opened any further.

In the west Madison Ave meets Western Avenue at a wye-intersection, it is referred to as "The Point" and it was here that the Mohawk and Hudson Railroad, the first railroad in the state of New York, had its Albany terminal. The right-of-way of Wolf Street/Lydius Street was to continue indefinitely, and today East Lydius Street in the town of Guilderland continues down the same line of the original plan of Wolf Street. The same is true of Madison Avenue Extension and much of Washington Avenue Extension in the Pine Bush of the city of Albany. In 1994 the city sold the "paper street" of Madison Avenue Extension adjacent to Crossgates Commons to the shopping center's then-owner Washington Commons Associates (today The Pyramid Companies).

Today, Madison Avenue from South Pearl Street west, forms part of U.S. Route 20. Madison Avenue forms the majority of the northern border of the Mansion Historic District, and has along its route Bleecker Park, the Cathedral of the Immaculate Conception, Empire State Plaza, New York State Museum, Dana Park, Washington Park, College of Saint Rose, and one of only two movie theaters in the city.

=== Washington Avenue ===
Originally King Street until the 1790 De Witt plan, it then became Lion Street. It was the beginning of the "King's Highway", a series of paths to Schenectady. Washington Avenue begins in the east at Eagle Street and from there it is New York Route 5 until the Y-intersection where Central Avenue splits to the north-east, NY 5 then follows Central. Washington Avenue from Quail Street to Manning Boulevard was in the late 1890s given by the state to the Washington Park Board of Commissioners to improve as a "speedway" or "public driveway". Today many important locations sit along Washington Ave such as the New York State Capitol, New York State Education Building, the Alfred E. Smith Building, One Commerce Plaza, downtown campus of SUNY Albany, the Albany High School, the W. Averell Harriman State Office Building Campus, and the uptown campus of SUNY Albany. At Fuller Road, Washington Avenue becomes Washington Avenue Extension (NY Route 910D), to New Karner Road (NY Route 155). The extension is a four-lane divided highway with at-grade crossings and access roads flanking the road hosting office parks and Crossgates Commons. Crossgates Commons is home to the largest Walmart in the United States. There is one limited-access exit, it allows access to and from Crossgates Mall in the neighboring town of Guilderland.

=== Lark Street ===
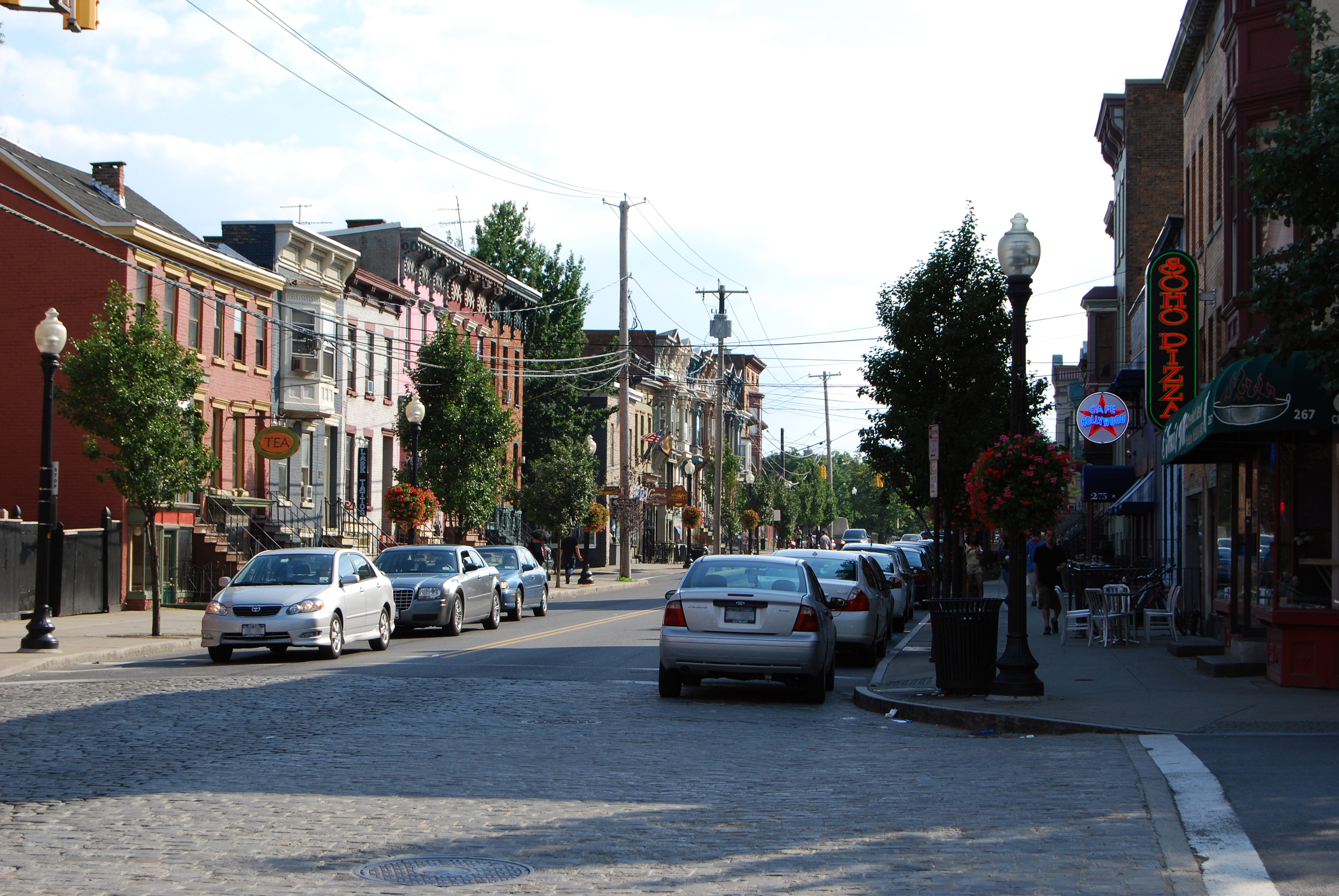
Lark Street

Lark Street is the main street of Midtown Albany, as well as the Hudson/Park and Center Square neighborhoods. Lark Street, like all the bird streets from De Witt's plan runs north–south. Lark runs north from Myrtle Avenue to Clinton Avenue, a second section starts on Clinton Ave just east of the first section and runs north to Manning Boulevard. On paper Lark Street still runs from Myrtle Ave south to the intersection of Morton Avenue and Hackett Boulevard though this section is not currently built, with the exception of a short common access for a Walgreens and McDonald's on Morton Ave. From Madison Ave to Clinton Ave, Lark Street is US Route 9W.

=== Knox Street/Northern Boulevard/Henry Johnson Boulevard ===
Swallow Street (whose name was Gage prior to 1790) was one of the few bird streets whose name was not kept, its name being changed to Knox Street in 1809. Knox Street would stretch north from Myrtle Avenue to Clinton Avenue, and eventually to Livingston Avenue. In 1896 Northern Boulevard was built from that intersection of Knox and Livingston north to Van Rensselaer Boulevard, including a 653-foot-long bridge over Tivoli Hollow and the New York Central Railroad's tracks, a modern bridge still carries Northern Boulevard at that location. In 1898 a 759-foot-long bridge was built to carry Knox from Central Avenue over Sheridan Hollow to Sheridan Avenue, and again a modern bridge is there today. When Washington Park was being created, Knox Street between Madison Ave and State Street was purchased in 1880 and all buildings were removed. Knox Street in the park is now a pedestrian mall, called the Knox Street Mall; it is the only straight path in the park. Later, Knox Street from State to Livingston would be changed to Northern Boulevard to match the street it met up with, this left the name Knox Street as only the three blocks between Myrtle and Madison in the Park South neighborhood. In 1991 Northern Boulevard from Livingston to State along with its extension within Washington Park to Madison Avenue at Willett Street was renamed Henry Johnson Boulevard in honor of an African-American World War I hero. The name Northern Boulevard remains from Livingston to Van Rensselaer Boulevard.

== Turnpikes ==
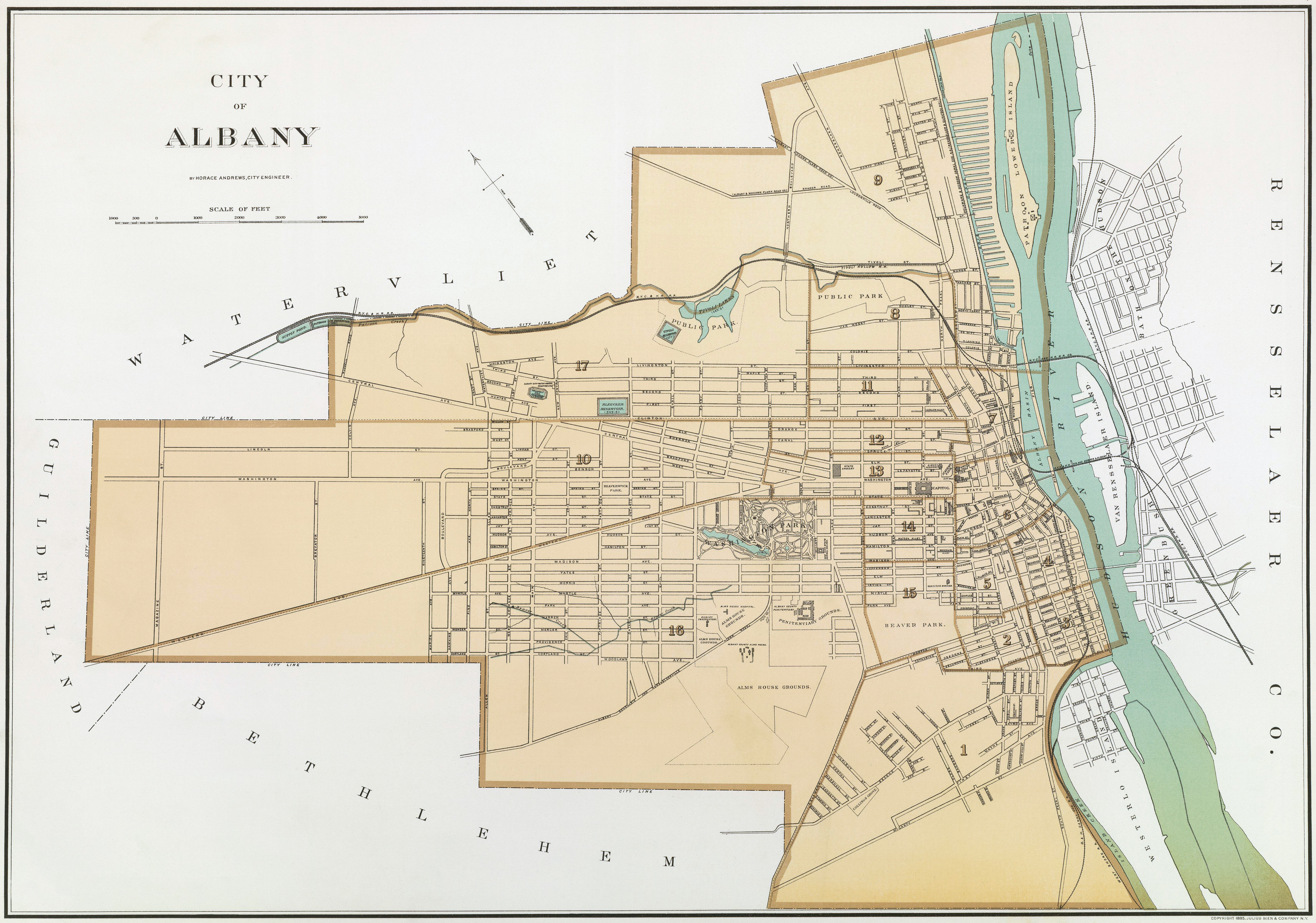
Map of Albany in 1895

Starting with the Great Western Turnpike in 1799, turnpikes began to radiate out from Albany into the countryside and also formed long distance routes across the state. Often they were built by private corporations with state charters, they originally had tolls. Over time they would be bought out by the city and become city streets, and they would be designated as state and US highways.

=== Central Avenue ===
Central Avenue was first called "the Bowery", it was at the Albany end of the many Native American trails linking Albany to Schenectady that would come to be called "King's Highway". Though incorporated as early as 1797 the Albany and Schenectady Turnpike Company did not construct the Albany and Schenectady Turnpike (also known as the Schenectady Turnpike) until 1802 which continued the line of the Bowery straight to Schenectady at State Street. In 1867 Albany changed the name of the Bowery to Central Avenue. Central Ave, which is also New York State Route 5, travels northwest from a Y-intersection with Washington Avenue to the border with the neighboring town of Colonie, just west of the CSXT railroad bridge. Central Avenue is Albany's current Main Street, and is home to Westgate Plaza the Capital District's first "suburban"-style shopping plaza. The section from Washington Avenue west to Watervliet Avenue is more urban with adjacent buildings and on-street parking. While the section from Watervliet Avenue west to city-line tends to be more suburban, with little or no on-street parking, large parking lots, shopping plazas, restaurants, large car-dealerships, big-box stores and fast food.

=== Delaware Avenue ===
Originally called the Delaware Turnpike because it was built over a Native American trail. The Delaware Turnpike was built by the Albany and Delaware Turnpike company, chartered in 1805 by the state of New York to build a road from Albany to Otego (which then was within Delaware County). The turnpike company had abandoned the road in 1868, and the name was changed to Delaware Avenue. Delaware Avenue runs from the intersection of Madison Avenue and Lark Street south and south-west to the city border with the town of Bethlehem. Some important locations along the road include Hackett Middle School, Lincoln Park, the Spectrum 8 movie theatre, a public library branch, the City Square Plaza (shopping plaza), and Graceland Cemetery. Delaware Avenue was also part of New York Route 43 until the 1970s when NY 43 was truncated to the intersection of Third and Broadway in the city of Rensselaer, Delaware then became New York State Route 443. Delaware Ave is also US Route 9W from its intersection with Madison Avenue south to the intersection with Southern Boulevard where 9W leaves for that boulevard.

=== New Scotland Avenue ===
The section of New Scotland Avenue from Madison Avenue to Myrtle Avenue was part of the original De Witt "bird-named" street of Snipe Street. The Albany, Rensselaerville, and Schoharie Plank Road would be chartered in 1850 and would build what is now New Scotland Avenue. The plank road would travel to the west and northwest to connect Albany to the hamlet of Hurstville in the town of Bethlehem, a hamlet that has since been annexed to Albany and no longer exists. The plank road then continued southwest to the Normans Kill (the present-day boundary of the city of Albany) where it crossed on a bridge and continued out to the hamlet of Slingerlands and beyond. The company was allowed to erect toll gates in 1861. New Scotland Avenue was part of New York State Route 85 from 1930 until the mid-1960s when the Slingerlands Bypass was constructed and NY 85 was rerouted on to it and the Crosstown Arterial to end at Interstate 90.

Today New Scotland Avenue has many colleges, hospitals, office buildings, and commercial/retail businesses. Albany Medical Center, Albany Law School, Albany College of Pharmacy, Sage College of Albany, a public library branch, a public elementary school and several private schools, St. Peter's Hospital, Maria College, and the Capital Hills At Albany (city-owned golf course) are all along New Scotland Ave.

== Other historic streets ==
=== Melrose Avenue ===
This short street bisects the Melrose neighborhood next to the Averell Harriman State Office Campus, it stretches from Winthrop Avenue northwest to Brevator Street. Melrose sits on the right-of-way of the Mohawk and Hudson Railroad which went from the Y-intersection of Madison and Western avenues to the city of Schenectady.

=== Manning Boulevard ===
Originally called Northern Boulevard the first section built in 1876 by the Board of Commissioners of Washington Park at the same time as Washington Park. It was also referred to as Boulevard. That first section constructed was just east of the toll-booth on Western Avenue, north and east to intersection of Central and Clinton avenues, at what would be called Manning Square. South of Western Avenue, Manning Boulevard was named Hawkins Avenue. In Stvdies for Albany (1914) which was commissioned by the city, it was proposed that Manning Boulevard be extended through Hawkins Avenue and continued to New Scotland Avenue and eventually to Delaware Avenue which it would then form a semicircular parkway around the city. The boulevard received its current name in honor of Daniel Manning, a former park commissioner and Secretary of the Treasury under President Grover Cleveland.

Manning Boulevard today extends from Whitehall Road northeast to Western Avenue and then northeast and east on to the intersection of Central and Clinton avenues. The boulevard then travels along the western edge of Swinburne Park. It then turns east to Tivoli Park. On the other side of Tivoli Park, Manning Boulevard continues alongside Livingston Middle School to Northern Boulevard. Manning Boulevard starts again to the south where Northern Boulevard turns southwest to join Henry Johnson Boulevard but the road continues southeast as Manning Boulevard. Manning Boulevard finally ends at Livingston Avenue across from Ten Broeck Street. Between Western and Washington avenues, Manning Blvd is unusual for an Albany city street for the houses along that section are along frontage roads on either side of that boulevard. There are four intersections for access to and from the frontage roads, including one that is also an intersection for Lancaster Street.

=== Southern Boulevard ===
Southern Boulevard is a major arterial in Albany connecting the city to Thruway exit 23 and further south to the suburbs in Bethlehem. Construction of Southern Boulevard was authorized by the state in Chapter 295 of the Laws of 1913 as a 1.59-mile-long (2.56 km) highway starting in the city at Delaware Avenue through what was then part of Bethlehem, over the Normans Kill gorge and meeting the Albany-Bethlehem Turnpike (also referred to as the Bethlehem or Stone Road) at what is today the intersection of Corning Hill Road and US Route 9W. An original proposal for the route of the highway was down Van Vechten Street between Delaware and McCarty avenues. The road was finished in 1916.

Southern Boulevard begins at an intersection with Delaware Avenue opposite the City Square Plaza, US 9W turns onto Southern from Delaware. Southern proceeds southeast to meet McAlpin Street, at which point McAlpin takes the name Southern and the US 9W designation. Southern continues east and after the intersection with the southern terminus of Interstate 787 (I-787), the name Southern Blvd/US 9W turns south while the street continues east as McCarty Avenue. Southern at this point becomes a 4 lane highway and passes over I-787. Exit 23 of Interstate 87/NYS Thruway has entrance and exit ramps meeting Southern Blvd and I-787 has a northbound entrance ramp accessible only for the northbound Southern Blvd lanes. The Thruway Authority headquarters are on the west side of the street before the boulevard leaves the city on a viaduct over the Normans Kill.

== Numbered streets/avenues ==
There are three sets of numbered roads in Albany, a set of four avenues in the South End, a set of three streets in Arbor Hill, and another set of three streets in North Albany. Second, Third, and Fourth avenues in the South End were until 1873 named Whitehall Road, Van Vechten Street, and Nucella Street. Second and Third streets in Arbor Hill were Elizabeth and John. Democratic Party boss Daniel P. O'Connell was born at 1 Second Ave on the corner with South Pearl Street, where a historical marker has commemorated the spot since 1986.

== Limited-access highways ==
Starting with the Governor Thomas E. Dewey Thruway in the mid-1950s Albany has had several limited-access highways planned for connecting it with other cities in the Northeastern United States and beyond. Many of these highways were never built, while some were only partially built.

=== New York State Thruway ===
In 1952-3 Albany's portion of the Thruway was built, connecting Albany to the other major cities of the state- New York, Schenectady, Utica, Syracuse, Rochester, and Buffalo. It is at Albany that the north-bound highway from Downstate turns west. The highway enters Albany from Bethlehem over the Normans Kill. Shortly after entering Albany is exit 23, the second busiest exit in the Thruway system, which connects the Thruway to Southern Boulevard (US Route 9W) which is a surface street, and to Interstate 787. The Thruway then turns northwest and passes under Delaware and New Scotland avenues before briefly leaving the city right before reaching the Slingerlands Bypass (New York Route 85). The Thruway again reenters the city after a short stretch in Bethlehem to pass under Krumkill Road before leaving the city once more by way of a bridge over the Krum Kill. The Thruway enters Albany one last time by passing underneath Washington Avenue Extension from Guilderland. Exit 24, the busiest exit on the Thruway, is here at the western end of Albany where the Thruway changes from being Interstate 87 to being Interstate 90. The Thruway then parallels Washington Avenue Ext as it leaves the city one last time.

=== Interstate 90 ===
Interstate 90 enters the City of Albany in its western panhandle, as a toll road, the New York State Thruway. However, soon after entering the city limits, the Thruway switches onto Interstate 87, with I-90 becoming a six-lane freeway. This portion of I-90 runs through the north side of Albany, near its border with the neighboring town of Colonie. The highway provides access to SUNY Albany's Uptown Campus (via interchanges with Fuller Road and Washington Avenue), as well as a direct connection to the W. Averell Harriman State Office Building Campus. Meanwhile, just east of the state office campus interchange, I-90 represents the northern terminus of the Crosstown Arterial (signed as New York State Route 85). Moving further east, I-90 provides indirect access to Central Avenue via the Everett Road exit, a direct connection to the Corporate Woods office park, and closer to downtown, interchanges with the truncated Mid-Crosstown Arterial (signed as U.S. Route 9) with access to Loudonville to the north and the Arbor Hill neighborhood of Albany. Finally, I-90 meets I-787, which passes through Downtown Albany to the south and the village of Menands to the north, before crossing the Hudson River and moving into Rensselaer County.

=== Interstate 787 ===
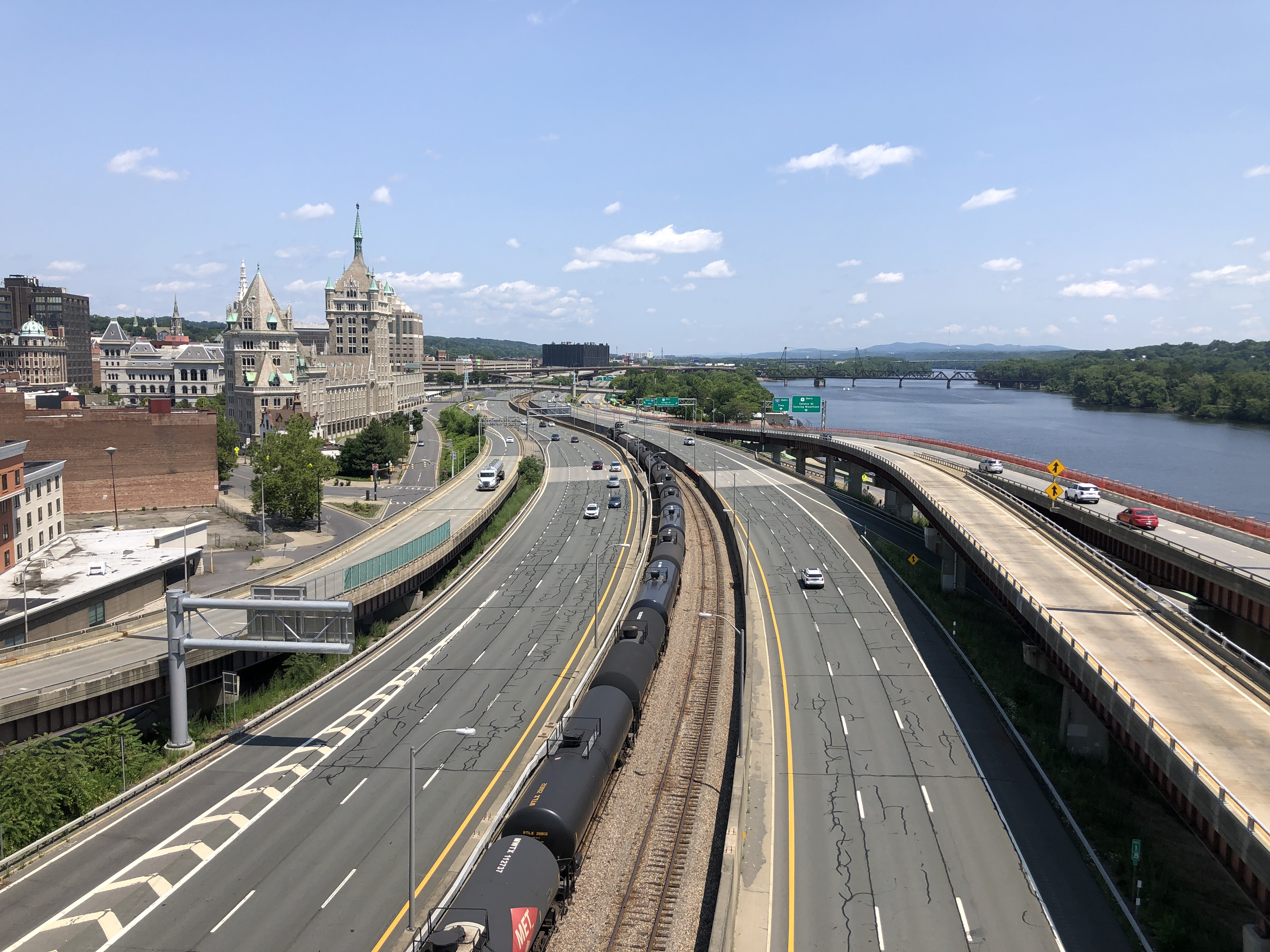
View north along I-787 from the US 9/US 20/South Mall Arterial "circle" interchange in downtown Albany

Interstate 787 connects the Thruway with downtown Albany and also connects Albany with points north in Albany County, such as Watervliet, Green Island, and Cohoes. Exits 2, 3(a and b), 4 (a and b), and 5 are within the city. The first stretch was constructed in the 1960s.

=== Crosstown Arterial ===
The Crosstown Arterial, signed as New York State Route 85, is a four-lane divided highway serving western sections of Albany, particularly the Buckingham Lake and Campus neighborhoods. Although Route 85 signed as a west-to-east route, the Crosstown Arterial portion generally moves from northeast to southwest while in the City of Albany. The arterial begins at Route 85's eastern terminus, an interchange with Interstate 90. The westbound side of the Crosstown Arterial has interchanges with Washington Avenue, the State Office Campus, Daytona Avenue (providing access to US 20/Western Avenue), and Krumkill Road. Beyond Krumkill Road just prior to crossing the NYS Thruway, the Crosstown Arterial enters the town of Bethlehem, and in that town changes from a limited access highway to a two-lane surface street, referred to as the Slingerlands Bypass. On the eastbound side, the Crosstown Arterial has slightly different exits, sharing the Krumkill Road and State Office Campus interchanges, but providing access to US 20 via Ormond Street, and lacking a Washington Avenue interchange. Instead, the final exit on the eastbound side of the Crosstown Arterial before its terminus at I-90 is an interchange with Lincoln Avenue, a surface road which terminates at the arterial. The Lincoln Avenue exit allows access to Washington Avenue via Colvin Avenue, and various side street.

=== Northway/Fuller Road Alternate ===
The Northway, the part of Interstate 87 (I-87) north of the New York State Thruway, was built in segments, which became I-87 as they were completed and linked to the pre-existing route. Construction began in the late 1950s on the portion of the Northway between the Thruway and NY 7 near Latham. This segment was open to traffic by 1960.

Fuller Road Alternate, the lone portion of the Adirondack Northway not part of I-87, was originally intended to be part of the Southern Albany Expressway, a proposed highway which would have connected the Northway to Interstate 787 and run parallel to the Thruway between exits 23 and 24.

Exit 1 of the Northway is the only exit on the highway that is within Albany, it connects the highway to Interstate 90 (I-90). The highway connects Albany to the suburbs to the north such as Latham, and Clifton Park; the resorts of Saratoga Springs and Lake George; and on to Plattsburgh and Montreal.

=== South Mall Arterial ===
The South Mall Arterial connects S. Swan Street with Interstate 787, and goes underneath the Empire State Plaza.

== See also ==
- History of Albany, New York
- Neighborhoods of Albany, New York
