= Berne, New York =

- Town
- Seal
- Mottoes: The center of the Helderbergs, "It's all down hill from here"
- Location in Albany County and the state of New York.
- Coordinates: 42°35′50″N 74°7′25″W
- Country: United States
- State: New York
- County: Albany

Government
  - Type: Town Council
  - Town Supervisor: Dennis Palow (Republican)
  - Town Council: Members' List: • Anita C. Clayton (Deputy Supervisor); • Leo Vane; • Thomas Doolin; • Albert Thiem

Area
  - Total: 64.73 sq mi (167.66 km^{2})
  - Land: 64.03 sq mi (165.84 km^{2})
  - Water: 0.70 sq mi (1.82 km^{2})
- Elevation: 1,350 ft (410 m)

Population (2020)
  - Total: 2,689
- Time zone: UTC-5 (Eastern (EST))
  - Summer (DST): UTC-4 (EDT)
- ZIP Codes: 12023 (Berne); 12059 (East Berne); 12186 (Voorheesville); 12193 (Westerlo); 12122 (Middleburgh); 12009 (Altamont)
- Area code: 518
- FIPS code: 36-001-06211
- GNIS feature ID: 0978728
- Website: berneny.gov

Berne is a town in Albany County, New York, United States. The population was 2,689 at the 2020 census. The town is at the western border of Albany County.

== History ==
The town of Berne was originally spelled "Bern", until the Berne Post Office was established in 1825. It was created in 1795 from part of the town of Rensselaerville. In 1822 the northern half of Berne was spun off to form the new town of Knox.

The earliest settlers were Palatine German refugees. Settlement began sometime before 1750. At that time, it was called Beaver Dam (also spelled Beaverdam). The settlers were actually squatters, since in the 18th and most of the 19th centuries, Berne was part of the Rensselaerswyck estate. The head of the Van Rensselaer family was the patroon who owned all the land on which the tenants in the Hudson Valley lived, and used feudal leases to maintain control of the region. Before the Revolutionary War, the patroons acted like feudal lords, with the right to make laws.

During the War, inhabitants fought on both sides of the conflict. Loyalists who supported the British left and went to Canada. Those who stayed and fought the British expected that if they won, they would either be released from their tenancy, or at the least, be allowed to purchase the land at fair market value. Instead, the new government of New York decided to honor the lease contracts of the patroons, who contributed heavily to the politicians.

The first meeting of the Town of Rensselaerville (which then included what are now known as the four "Hilltowns") was held in 1790 at the home of Johannes Fischer on Stranahan Lane. He may have been the wealthiest man in the town as he owned eight slaves in 1800. When the town of Bern was created in 1795, the first meeting was also held in the home of Johannes Fisher. It is now known as the Thomas Wood House.

The massacre of the Dietz family in 1781 was the only Iroquois incursion in Beaver Dam during the Revolution.

The first mass meeting of tenant farmers leading to the Anti-Rent War was held in Berne on July 4, 1839. In January 1845, one hundred and fifty delegates from eleven counties assembled in St. Paul's Lutheran Church to call for political action to redress their grievances.

== Geography ==
According to the United States Census Bureau, the town has a total area of 64.8 square miles (168 km^{2}), of which 64.1 square miles (166 km^{2}) is land and 0.6 square miles (1.6 km^{2}) (0.99%) is water.

== Demographics ==
Historical population
Census	Pop.	Note	%±
1810	5,134		—
1820	5,531		7.7%
1830	3,607		−34.8%
1840	3,740		3.7%
1850	3,441		−8.0%
1860	3,065		−10.9%
1870	2,562		−16.4%
1880	2,616		2.1%
1890	2,273		−13.1%
1900	1,947		−14.3%
1910	1,753		−10.0%
1920	1,371		−21.8%
1930	1,210		−11.7%
1940	1,325		9.5%
1950	1,348		1.7%
1960	1,542		14.4%
1970	2,037		32.1%
1980	2,532		24.3%
1990	3,053		20.6%
2000	2,846		−6.8%
2010	2,794		−1.8%
2020	2,689		−3.8%
U.S. Decennial Census 2020

As of the census of 2010, there were 2,794 people, 1,099 households, and 805 families residing in the town. The population density was 43.6 inhabitants per square mile (16.8/km^{2}). There were 1,385 housing units at an average density of 21.6 per square mile (8.3/km^{2}). The racial makeup of the town was 97.89% White, 0.39% African American, 0.39% Asian, 0.07% Pacific Islander, 0.25% from other races, and 1.02% from two or more races. Hispanic or Latino of any race were 0.77% of the population.

There were 1,099 households, out of which 33.9% had children under the age of 18 living with them, 59.0% were married couples living together, 8.6% had a female householder with no husband present, and 26.7% were non-families. 21.9% of all households were made up of individuals, and 7.4% had someone living alone who was 65 years of age or older. The average household size was 2.59 and the average family size was 3.00.

In the town, the population was spread out, with 25.4% under the age of 18, 5.9% from 18 to 24, 29.5% from 25 to 44, 27.2% from 45 to 64, and 12.0% who were 65 years of age or older. The median age was 40 years. For every 100 females, there were 97.9 males. For every 100 females age 18 and over, there were 99.0 males.

The median income for a household in the town was $47,174, and the median income for a family was $55,685. Males had a median income of $37,324 versus $29,125 for females. The per capita income for the town was $22,095. About 3.7% of families and 5.4% of the population were below the poverty line, including 6.3% of those under age 18 and 2.9% of those age 65 or over.

== Natural history ==
- Partridge Run Wildlife Management Area, on West Mountain, consists of 4,594 acres (18.59 km^{2}) of former abandoned upland farms. It has been improved with hiking trails, and parking lots and is available for birdwatching, cross-country skiing, snowshoeing, hunting, fishing, and trapping. Partridge Run and Cole Hill State Forest are units in the Helderbergs Management Area of the NYS Department of Environmental Conservation.
- Cole Hill State Forest, accessed from County Routes 2 and 3, has been improved with hiking trails, and parking lots and is available for birdwatching, cross-country skiing, snowshoeing, hunting, fishing, and trapping.
- Thacher State Park is on the eastern town line, partly in Berne but mainly in New Scotland, New York. It has campgrounds.
- The Long Path, runs from the George Washington Bridge in Fort Lee, New Jersey to Altamont, Albany County, New York. It crosses the Town of Berne, going from Cotton Hill and Dutch Settlement State Forests in Schoharie County, New York to the west, across the Partridge Run Wildlife Management Area, through Cole Hill State Forest, where it has 270-degree views of both the Catskills and Adirondacks from Roemer's High Point along the Helderberg Escarpment, and continues north to Thacher State Park, the Indian Ladder and finally its current end at NY 146.
- Thompson's Lake State Park was a state park at the northern end of Thompson's Lake. It is now a part of Thacher Park.
- Henry Hill, the highest point in Albany County, is in Berne, south of Partridge Run State Forest.
- Kenrose Sanctuary is 280 acres with one and one-half miles of trail through woodland, as farmland reverts to forest. The Nature Conservancy owns and manages the Kenrose Sanctuary, which was donated by the McAlpine family.

== Notable people ==
- John Warren Butterfield (November 18, 1801 – November 14, 1869), born in Berne, went on to found the Butterfield Overland Mail, the stage that was an early operation of American Express and Wells Fargo.
- Justice Joseph Philo Bradley (March 14, 1813 – January 22, 1892), born on a farm on the top of Cole Hill, served as an Associate Justice of the Supreme Court from 1870 to 1892. Bradley is best remembered as being the 15th and final member of the Electoral Commission that decided the disputed 1876 presidential election between Republican Rutherford B. Hayes and Democrat Samuel J. Tilden.
- Capt. Adam Bogardus (September 17, 1834 – March 23, 1913), born on a farm on Ravine Road on West Mountain, became the World Champion and United States Champion trap shootist. He is credited with popularizing trap shooting. He invented the first practical glass ball trap in 1877. He and his sons were renowned crack shots who toured with the Buffalo Bill's Wild West Show. He is in the National Trapshooting Hall of Fame.
- Albert Gallup (January 30, 1796 – November 5, 1851), born in Berne, was a U.S. Representative from New York from 1837 to 1839.
- M. E. Grenander (November 21, 1918 – May 28, 1998), born in Rewey, Wisconsin, was a professor of English and philanthropist, for whom the M.E. Grenander Department of Special Collections & Archives of the University Libraries of the University at Albany, the State University of New York is named. She and her second husband, James Corbett (a professor of physics at SUNY), prospered through the stock market. She donated $1 million to SUNY in his memory after his death in 1994. Grenander died in East Berne, New York, at 79 years of age.
- Adelmorn Sherman (January 30, 1820 – January 26, 1875) born in Berne, farmer, served in the Wisconsin State Assembly (1869–71).
- Hiram Walden (August 21, 1800 – July 21, 1880), born in Pawlet, Vermont, lived in Berne from 1818 to 1821, and manufactured axes. He then moved his ax factory to the Town of Wright to what became known as Waldensville. From 1849 to 1851, he was a United States democratic representative from New York's 21st district.

== Communities and locations in Berne ==
- Berne – The largest hamlet in the town, it is located at the intersection of New York State Route 443 and New York State Route 156. Before the post office was located here in 1825 it was called "Bernville". There is a Bernville that still exists today, and it is in Berks County, Pennsylvania. In the 19th and first half of the 20th century it had a number of stores, up to three hotels, several blacksmith shops, a funeral home, cabinet makers, harness makers, etc.; now it almost entirely residential. The town hall is located here in a former hotel. Upstairs is the Berne Museum with "ten rooms of history" operated by the Berne Historical Society.
- East Berne – A hamlet east of Berne village on New York State Route 443. It has a Stewarts, a hardware store and a post office. In 2019, Dollar General opened a store in East Berne.
- Reidsville – A hamlet in the southeastern part of the town.
- South Berne – A hamlet near the southern town line.
- Thompsons Lake – A small community in the northeastern section of the town, south of Thompsons Lake. In the late 19th and early 20th century, it was a summer resort. Now the major hotels are gone and most of the cottages around the lake are lived in year-round.
- Warners Lake – A lake and the surrounding community in the north-central part of the town, just west of East Berne. In the late 19th and early 20th century, it was a summer resort. Now the public beaches are closed and the boarding houses are private residences. Many of the cottages around the lake are lived in year-round. There is one restaurant on the northeastern side of the lake.
- West Berne – A hamlet near the western town line and west of Berne hamlet New York State Route 443. The community was once called "Mechanicsville" and "Peoria". In the 19th and first half of the 20th century, it had a number of stores and a couple of blacksmith shops; now it is strictly residential.

== Politics ==
Presidential results
Year	Democrat	Republican
2008	Obama 50%	McCain 47%
2012	Obama 52%	Romney 45%
2016	Clinton 40%	Trump 52%
2020	Biden 42%	Trump 55%
2024	Harris 40%	Trump 59%
