= New Course at Albany =

Golf course in Albany, New York

Coordinates: 42°39′4.3″N 73°49′15.4″W

The New Course at Albany, now the Capital Hills at Albany golf course and formerly Albany Municipal Golf Course is an 18-hole golf course located in Albany, New York.

== History ==
In 1929 the mayor of Albany declared it was an "imperative" for the city to have a municipal golf course, and so a nine-hole was temporarily established while a permanent 18-hole constructed between May 1931 and May 1932. At the time the golf course was located on land in the hamlet of Hurstville in the town of Bethlehem, outside the city limits. It was not until 1967 that the course would be annexed into the city that owned it.
