= Cotton Hill (New York) =

Mountain in New York, United States

- Location within New York Adirondack Park Location within the United States

Highest point
- Elevation: 2,110 feet (640 m)
- Coordinates: 42°37′44″N 74°16′01″W, 42°37′02″N 74°16′35″W

Geography
- Location: NE of Middleburgh, New York, U.S.
- Topo map(s): USGS Schoharie, Middleburgh

Cotton Hill is a mountain in Schoharie County, New York. It is located northeast of Middleburgh. The Cliff is located southwest and Rundy Cup Mountain is located north of Cotton Hill.
