= New York State Department of Taxation and Finance =

Department of the New York state government

Department of Taxation and Finance
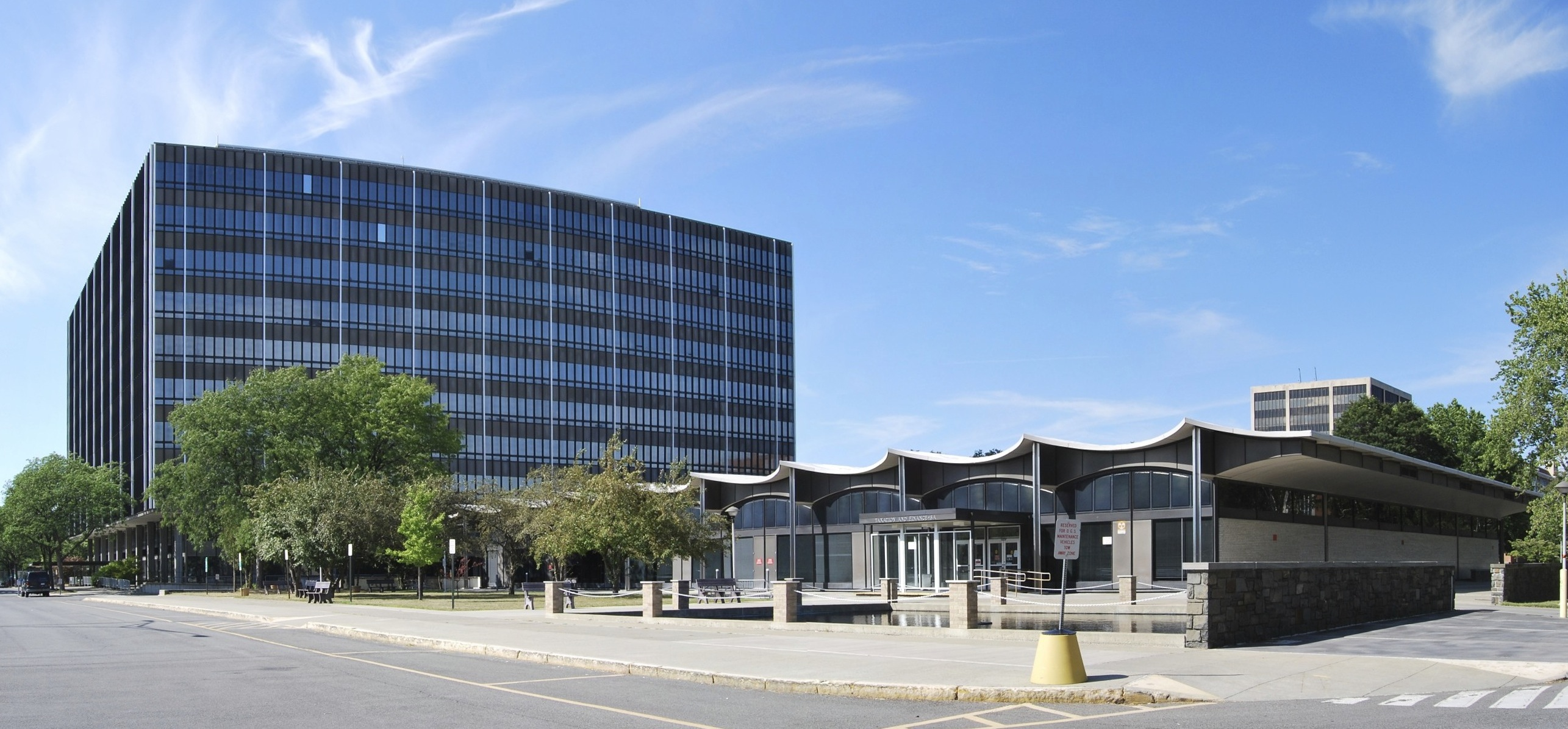
- Department of Taxation and Finance headquarters in Albany

Department overview
- Formed: January 1, 1927
- Jurisdiction: New York
- Key document: Tax Law
- Website: www.tax.ny.gov

The New York State Department of Taxation and Finance (NYSDTF) is the department of the New York state government responsible for taxation and revenue, including handling all tax forms and publications, and dispersing tax revenue to other agencies and counties within New York State. The department also has a law enforcement division, the New York State Office of Tax Enforcement. Its regulations are compiled in title 20 of the New York Codes, Rules and Regulations.

It is headquartered in Building 8/8A at the W. Averell Harriman State Office Building Campus in Albany.

During the September 11 attacks, the department had offices on the 86th and 87th floors of the World Trade Center's South Tower. On the 86th floor, five of eight employees in the revenue crimes bureau died. On the 87th floor, the mediation services bureau lost six of seven employees. Of the estimated 20 people on the 87th floor, nine were lost, including two of three senior staff.

The tax department was formally created on January 1, 1927, but the first signs of the department date to 1859. The original intent was to find a way (a mathematical formula) to distribute tax revenue to individual counties in New York State.

In 2025, the FBI asked Citibank to freeze accounts of the New York State Department of Taxation and Finance.

== Enforcement ==
The New York State Office of Tax Enforcement (OTE) is the law enforcement entity of the New York State Department of Taxation and Finance (DTF) that conducts criminal and civil investigations. The office is divided into two bureaus, the Petroleum, Alcohol and Tobacco Bureau (PATB) and the Revenue Crimes Bureau (RCB) that was recently renamed the Special Investigations Unit (SIU).

== See also ==
- New York City Department of Finance
