= W. Averell Harriman State Office Building Campus =

Office park in Albany, New York

Coordinates: 42°40′46.32″N 73°48′34.2″W

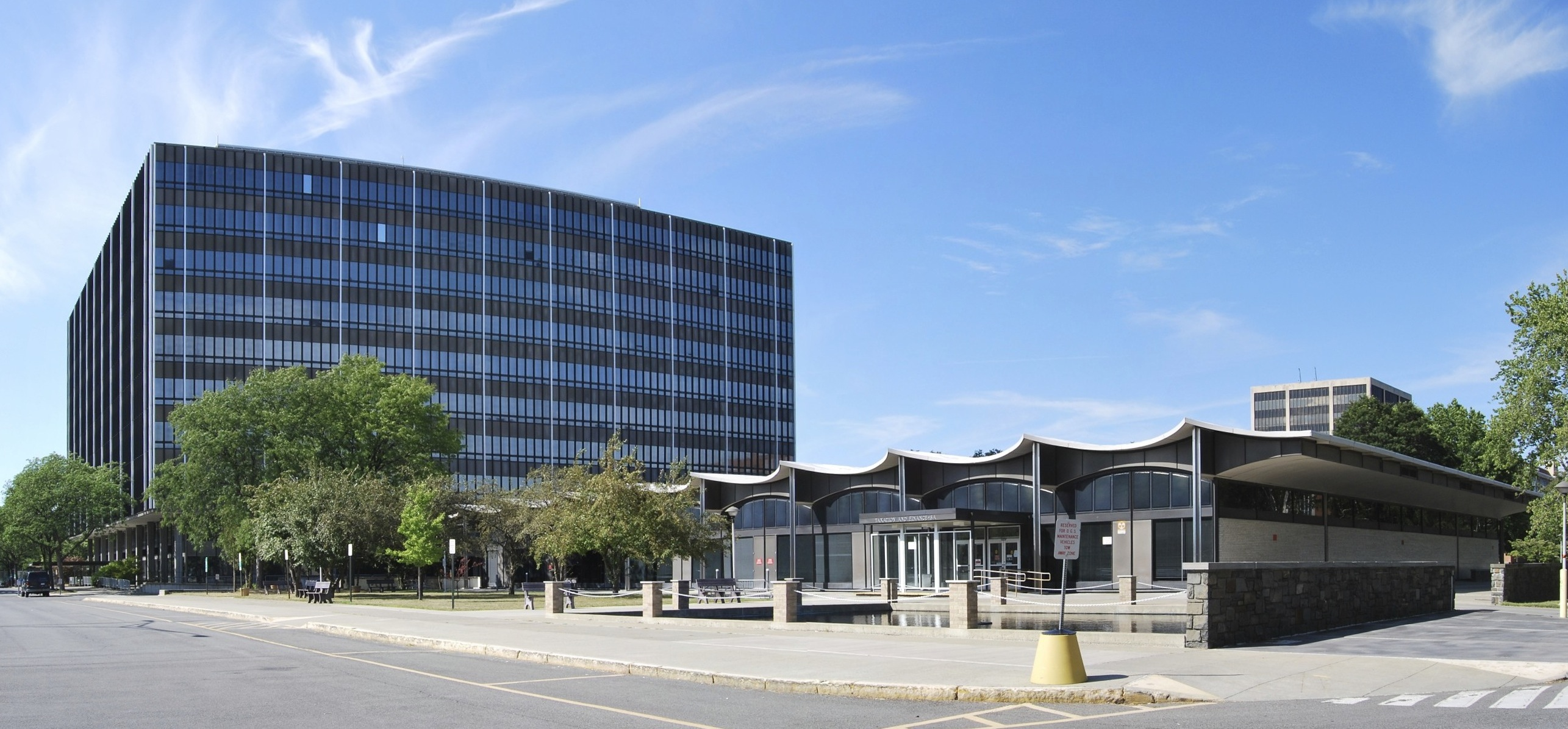
The Department of Taxation and Finance (Buildings 8 and 8A)

The W. Averell Harriman State Office Building Campus is an office park in western Albany, New York, United States that houses sixteen New York State Government office buildings. The land totals roughly 330 acres (130 ha) and over 3 million square feet (280,000 m^{2}) of office space, and about 7,000 state employees work there. The campus was built during the 1950s and 1960s in a suburban, car-oriented style bordered by an outer ring road that cuts the campus off from the surrounding neighborhoods. The campus is flanked by Washington Avenue to the north, Western Avenue to the south, University at Albany to the west, and New York State Route 85 to the east. With its own steam generation power plant for cooling and heating (Building 17) the campus is mostly self-sufficient.

== History ==
The campus was planned in the 1950s by Governor W. Averell Harriman to offer more parking and easier access for state employees. Prior to this the land was part of the Albany Pine Bush with the Albany Country Club to the west where the University at Albany is today. The first building (Building 1, Department of Civil Service) was built in 1956, and 2, 9, and 17 were completed by the early 1960s, but most of the buildings were built in the mid-late 1960s under Governor Nelson Rockefeller. In 1964 the Division Headquarters Building (Building 22) of the New York State Police was built in the campus, marking the first time that the administrative and headquarters support services were consolidated in the same building. Three years later the State Police Academy (Building 24) was built next door. The State Police Forensics Center (Building 30), was built in 1994. In 1987 less than 2 acres (0.81 ha) on Brevator Street was given at no charge to the city of Albany for use of a new fire station, Engine 10. This increased coverage for the western part of the city, including the Harriman Campus and University at Albany.

Starting with Governor Hugh Carey in the 1970s, policy has been to relocate workers from the Harriman Campus and other suburban settings to the various downtowns of the Capital District; Albany, Schenectady and Troy. The plan continued under governors Mario Cuomo and George Pataki; Pataki signed into law in 1998 the $235 million Albany Plan that further sped up the process and included privatizing the campus after moving the majority of state workers to other locations. From 1995 to 2005 over 13,364 state workers were relocated around the Capital District, including moving the 1,400 New York State Department of Transportation workers from the Harriman Campus to a renovated 50 Wolf Road in Colonie (the former New York State Department of Environmental Conservation headquarters).

The Harriman Research and Technology Development Corporation (HRTDC) was established in 2004 as a subsidiary of the Empire State Development Corporation and has been tasked with the redevelopment of the campus. The plan was originally envisioned in 2003 as a bold move to completely eliminate the ring road, demolish the existing buildings, and construct a hotel, commercial, residential, and high tech office space all integrated with the surrounding neighborhoods. The Harriman Campus once included land north of Washington Avenue and south of Interstate 90. In 2006 Columbia Development purchased 12.6 acres (5.1 ha) of surface-parking north of Washington Ave for $4.2 million to add to its growing Patroon Creek Corporate Center. Buildings 1 and 1a were slated to be demolished in 2006 as part of that Albany Plan, funded with the proceeds from the parking lot sale to Columbia Development. As of 2015, the buildings have been demolished.

That far-reaching plan, however, was scrapped by Governor Eliot Spitzer in 2007. Two very different proposals were put forth, one by the Howard Group that kept to the original idea of integration, retail, and residential space and demolition of existing structures, the other by Columbia Development. Columbia Development's proposal, which would keep the state office buildings and privatize the land putting it back on the tax rolls piecemeal as tenants were lined up, was the one chose by the HRTDC. Residential development would take a smaller role as would retail. The ring road would also stay unless land requirements would require moving it, but not until tenants were definitely lined up for space. The campus would remain apart and segregated from the surrounding neighborhoods. Columbia Development will begin with just a five to 15-acre (61,000 m^{2}) parcel in the northwest corner of the campus and has a one-year window starting in 2010 to market it for development. The neighboring University at Albany has petitioned for a transfer of 3.3 acres (1.3 ha) from the Harriman Campus to the university in order to build a new dormitory, and the HRTDC agreed to the transfer. This has taken place; it was under the purview of the Office of General Services (OGS), the state agency that acts as landlord for state-owned property, since the former OGS Commissioner John Egan was also the chairman of the HRTDC this was not likely to be a problem.

Plans to relocate state workers and privatize the campus have seen a further reversal as time has passed. Recently 200 employees of the Office of Real Property Services have been moved from downtown Albany to the campus, as well as plans for a new 3-story building to house a laboratory for 50 workers of the Department of Agriculture. Preliminary plans also call for a $100 million data center for the Department of Technology.

Agriculture and Markets, the new Building # 6, is complete and occupied. Further, in 2015, the Office of General Services' Business Services Center moved into a renovated Building 5.

In July 2016, New York State released a Request for Proposals for a 27-acre part of the Harriman Campus for sale to private investment.

== Map ==
http://www.albanylocal.com/w-averell-harriman-state-office-campus-map/

== Buildings ==
Building	Tenant	Floors	Constructed	Proposed future use'
1/1A	Formerly Department of Civil Service	3	1958/1970	Demolished
2	Department of Corrections and Community Supervision	3	1958	Demolish (New York State OGS announced on 11/22/2016 that demolition would start on 11/28/2016)
3	Campus Children's Center - previously Cafeteria & Credit Union Remodeled 2015-16	1	1964	Opened September 2016
4	Former Campus Children's Center Remodel to begin late 2016; Reopened Summer 2021 with NYS Department of Corrections and Community Supervision as tenant	3	1964	Office/R&D
5	Re-opened on or about 7/7/2015 after renovations Office of General Services (OGS) Business Services Center (BSC); Office of the State Comptroller (OSC); E-licensing; Office of Information Technology Services (ITS); Formerly Department of Transportation	7	1963	As is
6	Department of Agriculture and Markets Lab	3	2013	As is
7/7A	Department of Agriculture and Markets (7); Harriman Business Center Incubator (7A); Division of Homeland Security and Emergency Services (7A); Office of Counter Terrorism (7A); Office of Cyber Security (7A); Office of Interoperable and Emergency Communications (7A)	3-9	1963/1972	Office/R&D
8/8A	Department of Taxation and Finance	8/1	1964	Demolish
9	Department of Taxation and Finance	4	1961	Office
12	Department of Labor	5	1963	Demolish
17	Steam generation power plant (Campus Power Plant)	1	1960	As is
18	Office of General Services, CRU/Graphics; Campus management and security	1	1965	As is
21	Department of Education Records Center	1	1967	As is
22	New York State Office of Emergency Management; New York State Police	4	1964	As is
24	New York State Police Academy		1967	As is
30	New York State Police Forensics Center		1994	As is

=== Harriman Business Center Incubator ===
The Harriman Business Center is a business incubator in Building 7A at the campus. The University at Albany's Small Business Development Center has an office on-site to provide consulting, training, and other services. The University also has its College of Computing and Information at the incubator. Other tenants are the New School of Radio and Television, Petrolab (a division of Ametek), Applied Visions, Inc., and Breonics (a bio-medical research firm)0.

=== State Emergency Management Office ===
Below the Harriman Campus is a two-story underground bunker designed to withstand a nuclear attack, adjacent to the State Police Headquarters. This bunker was built over 40 years ago to assure continuation of the government of the state of New York in case of an emergency during the Cold War. As originally built it was to accommodate 400 people for up to two weeks, during the late 1990s it received a $1 million renovation to house the State Emergency Management Office (SEMO) in response to concerns over the Y2K bug. It has been brought to full-operation multiple times, including the following: once on January 1, 2000 to monitor the Y2K bug, then again after the September 11th attacks, and again during both responses to Hurricane Irene & Tropical Storm Lee (2011) and Superstorm Sandy. It is a fully functional emergency management office, housing the state coordination center, or Emergency Operations Center (EOC), and manages disaster response for the State of New York, as warranted.

== Infrastructure ==
Of the roughly 330 acres (1.3 km^{2}) that comprise the Harriman Campus about 155 of them (45%) is open-space; the rest is buildings, roads, sidewalks, and parking lots. Two ring roads surround the main portion of the campus. The outer road is a three lane one-way traveling counterclockwise and has thirteen access points to NY 85, I-90, Brevator Street, Western Avenue, and Washington Avenue. The inner road is a three lane one-way traveling clockwise and allows access to campus buildings and parking lots. The roads are connected by several one-way Texas U-turns. Peak traffic counts on all six lanes of the ring road is approximately 4,000 vehicles per hour. The highest volume of traffic entering the campus ring road is from the Crosstown Arterial (NY 85).

The Capital District Transportation Authority (CDTA) runs public transit lines through the campus connecting it to the surrounding region.

The Building 17 Campus Power Plant produces steam that is piped to all the buildings through a duct-system. It is used for heating during the winter and is used to generate chilled water for cooling from April to October. Electricity is delivered to the campus by National Grid.

The New York State Police Troop G serves the needs of the campus. The city of Albany's West Station supplements the state police presence as needed. Fire protection is provided by the city of Albany's Engine 10 fire station on Brevator Street.

== Activities ==
The New York State Office of General Services’ Special Events Office puts on craft shows, a farmer's market, and noon-time food vendors in a central courtyard at the campus. A memorial garden in memory of the September 11th attacks is located near Buildings 8 and 9. Unofficial activities that take place (and are not actually permitted) are jogging, bird-watching, dog-walking, and on the ring road- road races.

== Sick Building Syndrome ==
In 1991, several employees of Building 8 became ill after the pesticide chlorpyrifos was misused in the building.
