= New York State Route 85A =

State highway in Albany County, New York, US

New York State Route 85A
- Map of Albany County in eastern New York with NY 85A highlighted in red

Route information
- Auxiliary route of NY 85
- Maintained by NYSDOT
- Length: 5.59 mi (9.00 km)
- Existed: c. 1932–present

Major junctions
- West end: NY 85 in New Scotland
- East end: NY 85 in New Scotland

Location
- Country: United States
- State: New York
- Counties: Albany

Highway system
- New York Highways; Interstate; US; State; Reference; Parkways
← NY 85	→ I-86

New York State Route 85A (NY 85A) is an east–west state highway in Albany County, New York, in the United States. It serves as a 5.54-mile (8.92 km), two-lane alternate route of NY 85 through the town of New Scotland, running from the hamlet of New Salem to the hamlet of New Scotland. While NY 85 bypasses the village of Voorheesville to the south, NY 85A directly serves it, connecting to two state routes inside of the village limits. The route was assigned c. 1932 to its current alignment.

== Route description ==
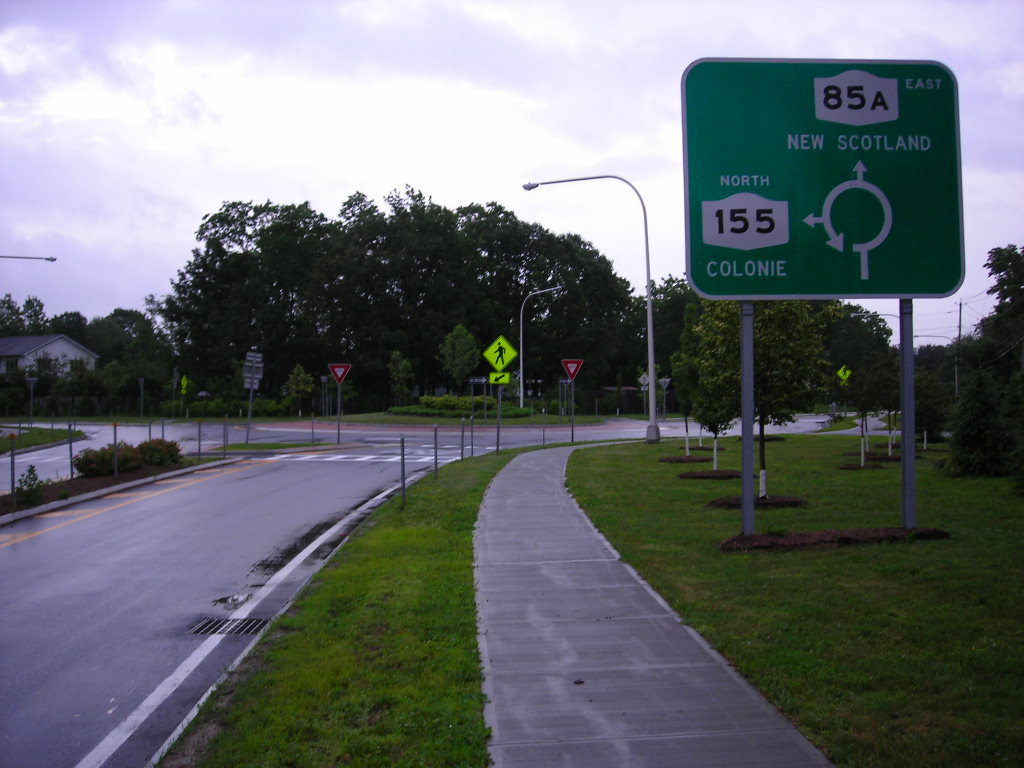
NY 85A eastbound at the junction with NY 155 in Voorheesville. The "North" above the NY 155 shield should say "East".

NY 85A begins at an intersection with NY 85 in the hamlet of New Salem, located in the northwestern portion of the town of New Scotland. It heads northward from the site of the Punkintown Fair as New Salem Road, leaving New Salem for slightly more open areas north of the hamlet. Development along the route remains high, however, as the two-lane road passes by several residential street and serves Clayton A. Bouton High School. About one-half mile (0.8 km) north of New Salem, the route makes a sharp turn to the east, running by another line of homes on its way into the village of Voorheesville. Inside the village, NY 85A becomes known as Helderberg Parkway.

As it approaches the center of the village, NY 85A serves Voorheesville Elementary School and meets the eastern end of NY 156. While NY 156 heads northwest out of the village on Altamont Road, NY 85A continues east through Voorheesville's commercial and residential center on Maple Avenue. Along the way, the route passes by a village park and passes under the CSX Transportation-owned Selkirk Subdivision rail line. On the eastern fringe of the village, the route connects to the western terminus of NY 155 by way of a roundabout. Now under the name Maple Road, NY 85A heads southeast from the village, connecting to several housing tracts and passing by Colonie Country Club. Roughly one mile (1.6 km) from NY 155, the highway turns due southward, traversing open fields to return to NY 85 at a junction east of the hamlet of New Scotland.

== History ==
The entirety of modern NY 85A was taken over by the state of New York by 1926 and designated as NY 85A c. 1932. East of Voorheesville, NY 85A was originally concurrent with NY 156 to NY 85, where both routes ended. The overlap between the two routes was eliminated when NY 156 was truncated to Voorheesville at some point between 1950 and 1965.

== Major intersections ==
The entire route is in Albany County.

Location	mi	km	Destinations	Notes
New Scotland	0.00	0.00	NY 85 – Thacher Park	Western terminus; hamlet of New Salem
Voorheesville	3.11	5.01	NY 156 west – Altamont	Eastern terminus of NY 156
Voorheesville	3.78	6.08	NY 155 east – Guilderland, Colonie	Western terminus of NY 155; roundabout
New Scotland	5.59	9.00	NY 85 – Slingerlands	Eastern terminus
1.000 mi = 1.609 km; 1.000 km = 0.621 mi
