= New Salem, New York =

- Hamlet
- Location within New York Location within the United States
- Coordinates: 42°37′22″N 73°58′04″W
- Country: United States
- State: New York
- Region: Capital District
- County: Albany
- Town: New Scotland
- Settled (farmland): 1770
- Elevation: 420 ft (130 m)
- Time zone: UTC-5 (EST)
  - Summer (DST): UTC-4 (EDT)
- ZIP Code: 12186 (Voorheesville)
- Area code: 518

New Salem is a hamlet in the town of New Scotland, Albany County, New York, United States. It is located in a valley at the foot of the Helderberg Escarpment along New York State Route 85. A local fair and car show is held every year in this small hamlet. It is also home to the town of New Scotland's community center and museum.

== History ==
The area of New Salem was first settled as farmland around 1770 and soon the Beaverdam Road was established through the future hamlet. Legend has it that the original name of the hamlet, Punkintown, was because a sow and her litter were able to live inside a "punkin" (pumpkin) since the pumpkins grown in the area grew so large. When the post office was established here in 1830 the name New Salem was used.

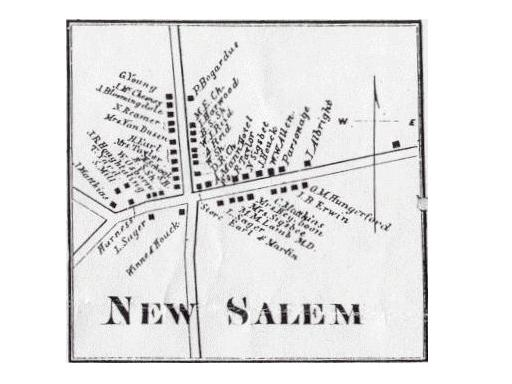
Map of New Salem in 1866

In 1806, the Beaverdam Road was moved to follow the contour of the mountains and from this time the progress of New Salem began with the building of several houses and a church. In 1850 the Albany, Rensselaerville, and Schoharie Plank Road Company was established by the state to construct a plank road from Albany through New Salem, to Gallupville in Schoharie County. The section from New Salem north and east to Albany was graded and planked but the section from New Salem west to Berne was not improved. In 1854, the state authorized the company to abandon or sell portions and to turn other sections into a turnpike and charge tolls, the section from New Salem east to the hamlet of New Scotland subsequently had its planks removed.

In 1947, DeWitt Carl moved his service station to New Salem from Albany naming the New Salem Garage, and in 1961 he transformed it into an auto dealership dealing exclusively with Saabs. New Salem Garage Inc., even though no longer in New Salem continues to use the name, and remains the seventh oldest Saab dealership in the United States and the oldest continually family-owned and operated Saab dealership in the Northeastern US. In the early 1990s, the New Salem Garage moved four miles east to a Slingerlands address and the location in New Salem (with the same owners and still named the New Salem Garage, just as the car dealership) became a lawn and garden center specializing in Cub Cadet lawn tractors, mowers, and snowblowers.

The New Salem Schoolhouse, a former one-room rural schoolhouse, was used by the New Salem Historical Society and the New Scotland town senior citizens group when in 1988 the town decided to enlarge and renovate the building in order to make it the town's first community center. In 1997, the New Scotland Historical Society opened a museum of the town's history in the community center's Spaulding Room.

== Geography ==
New Salem is located in the western section of the town of New Scotland, west of the hamlet of that name and southwest of the village of Voorheesville. The hamlet sits in a valley formed by the Helderberg Escarpment to the west and some hills to the east. The core of the hamlet is situated at the intersection of New Scotland Road (New York State Route 85) and the western terminus of New York State Route 85A (New Salem Road).

== Culture ==
New Salem is home to the Wyman Osterhout Community Center, a former one-room school house. The community center is home to the New Scotland Historical Society (NSHS), the senior citizen center, and the NSHS's town history museum. Since 1942 the town has hosted a Punkintown Fair originally meant to raise money for cigarettes and other goods for soldiers overseas in World War II, since 1946 it has been sponsored by the volunteer fire department to raise money for new equipment. A classic car show is held the weekend prior to the fair.

== Education ==
New Salem is a part of the Voorheesville Central School District (VCS) and the children attend Voorheesville Elementary School for kindergarten through fifth grade, Voorheesville Middle School for grades six to eight and Clayton A. Bouton High School for ninth through twelfth.
