= Rundy Cup Mountain =

Mountain in New York, United States

- Location within New York Adirondack Park Location within the United States

Highest point
- Elevation: 1,870 feet (570 m)
- Coordinates: 42°38′46″N 74°15′50″W

Geography
- Location: NE of Middleburgh, New York, U.S.
- Topo map: USGS Schoharie

Rundy Cup Mountain is a mountain in Schoharie County, New York. It is located northeast of Middleburgh. The Cliff is located southwest and Zimmer Hill is located east of Rundy Cup Mountain.
