= Hurstville, New York =

Hurstville City of Albany, New York
- Former hamlet of Bethlehem, New York
- Etymology: Named for William Hurst
- Location of Hurstville within the state of New York
- Coordinates: 42°39′25″N 73°48′50″W
- Country: United States
- State: New York
- Region: Capital District
- County: Albany
- Established: 1861
- Time zone: UTC-5 (EST)
  - Summer (DST): UTC-4 (EDT)
- ZIP Code: 12208
- Area code: 518

Hurstville is a former hamlet in the town of Bethlehem, New York. Today it is part of the city of Albany. Hurstville was located in the area of a bend in the Albany, Rensselaerville, and Schoharie Turnpike (today New Scotland Avenue) at its intersections with Whitehall and Krumkill roads, just outside the city limits of Albany.

== History ==
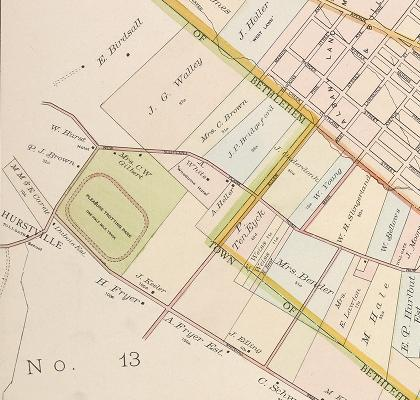
Map of Hurstville in 1891

Hurstville's earliest settlers were Urban Van Hart, William Gilber, and a man by the name of Hagadorn. Hagadorn built a log tavern which gave this place its earliest name, that of Log Tavern. In 1861 William Hurst moved to this location and, within a few years of the Albany, Rensselaerville, and Schoharie Plank Road (later turnpike) being built through here, built the Hurstville Hotel. The hotel was built on the site of an earlier hotel, the "Log Tavern". He also later built a trotting track at the northeast corner of Whitehall Road and New Scotland Avenue. During the Prohibition Era the hotel was known as the Love Nest and was a speak easy. The hotel burned down in 1929.

The Albany Municipal Golf Course was constructed at Hurstville.

In 1967, the hamlets of Hurstville and Karlsfeld—whose residents wished for access to city water and sewer services—were annexed to the city of Albany.
