= Voorheesville, New York =

Voorheesville
- Village
- Seal

- Location in Albany County and the state of New York.

- Location within New York Location within the United States
- Coordinates: 42°38′59″N 73°55′45″W
- Country: United States
- State: New York
- County: Albany
- Town: New Scotland

Area
  - Total: 2.14 sq mi (5.55 km^{2})
  - Land: 2.14 sq mi (5.54 km^{2})
  - Water: 0.0039 sq mi (0.01 km^{2})
- Elevation: 338 ft (103 m)

Population (2020)
  - Total: 2,841
  - Density: 1,328.3/sq mi (512.87/km^{2})
- Time zone: UTC-5 (Eastern (EST))
  - Summer (DST): UTC-4 (EDT)
- ZIP code: 12186
- Area code: 518
- FIPS code: 36-77684
- GNIS feature ID: 0968604
- Website: www.villageofvoorheesville.gov

Voorheesville /ˈvɔːriːzˌvɪl/ is a village within the town of New Scotland in Albany County, New York, United States. It is a suburb of Albany and part of the city's historic metropolitan area. The population was 2,841 at the 2020 census. The village is named after a railroad attorney, Alonzo B. Voorhees.

The village is situated by the northern town line of New Scotland.

== History ==
The area was settled by farmers sent by the Rensselaer family. In the 19th century, their descendants rebelled against the patroon system, fomenting a Rent War.

In 1864, two railroads were built through the town of New Scotland, headed west from the Hudson River, both trying to find a way around the Helderberg Mountains. The Albany and Susquehanna Railroad and the New York, West Shore and Buffalo Railroads crossed one another in a farm field. Subsequently, a village grew up around the crossroad and in 1899 the village of Voorheesville, named for the aforementioned railroad attorney, was incorporated. In 1870, the A&S was leased to the Delaware and Hudson Canal Company. These railroads crossed at South and North Main, and for a significant period of time there was a passenger train that came through Voorheesville. Voorheesville for several years in its early days (it was originally referred to as Union Depot before being named after Alonzo B. Voorhees) was something of a tourist attraction. The village boasted a hotel, the Friars Grove Hotel, located right across Grove Street from the train station. Just next to the hotel was a brick oven bakery, and further up Grove was a cider mill. The mill was bought out by Duffy Mott and Mott's Cider before eventually closing. The village also claimed the renowned Harris House, a tavern and hotel for the "weary traveler", a foundry that closed after a fire whose remnants still stand today, and Vly Creek (which runs through the entire village before connecting to the Normanskill Creek in Guilderland) was dammed up near the present day elementary school as a swimming hole. Historically until 2003/2004, the village railroad crossing was unique only like one other location in the United States in that four different sets of railroad tracks ran through the village and crossed at one point. The double tracked CSX (former NYC, PC, Conrail) line is still frequently used, while the remains of the D&H line west of the village is leased to SMS Rail lines, which services the Northeast Industrial Park under contract with Canadian Pacific. The West Shore line remained unused. In 2003 and 2004 the D&H line east of the village was torn up, leaving the village crossing a part of history.

== Demographics ==
Historical population
Census	Pop.	Note	%±
1900	554		—
1910	533		−3.8%
1920	614		15.2%
1930	644		4.9%
1940	717		11.3%
1950	895		24.8%
1960	1,228		37.2%
1970	2,826		130.1%
1980	3,320		17.5%
1990	3,225		−2.9%
2000	2,705		−16.1%
2010	2,789		3.1%
2020	2,841		1.9%
U.S. Decennial Census

According to the 2010 Census, the racial makeup of the village was 96.5% White, 0.8% African American, 0.2% American Indian or Alaska Native, 1.5% Asian, 0.0% Native Hawaiian and Other Pacific Islander, and 0.1% Some Other Race. Of the 2,789 person total population, 97 were not White alone or in combination.

== Education ==
Two schools in the village, Voorheesville Elementary School and Clayton A. Bouton High School are part of the Voorheesville Central School District, and service the village, most parts of the Town of New Scotland and the hamlet of Slingerlands, with some students coming from the outskirts of the Town of Guilderland, Town of Bethlehem, and Village of Altamont. The elementary school serves students in grades kindergarten through fifth grade, while Clayton A. Bouton High School serves sixth grade through twelfth grade, with a separate wing for the middle school.
