= Washington Avenue (Albany, New York) =

Route in the city of Albany, New York, USA

- Interactive map of Washington Avenue
- Coordinates: 42.6838°N 73.8100°W
- East end: Eagle Street
- Major junctions: US 9W Lark Street; NY 5 Central Avenue; Western Avenue; Fuller Road (Albany County Route 156)
- West end: NY 155 New Karner Road

Washington Avenue is a major east–west route in the city of Albany, New York.

== History ==
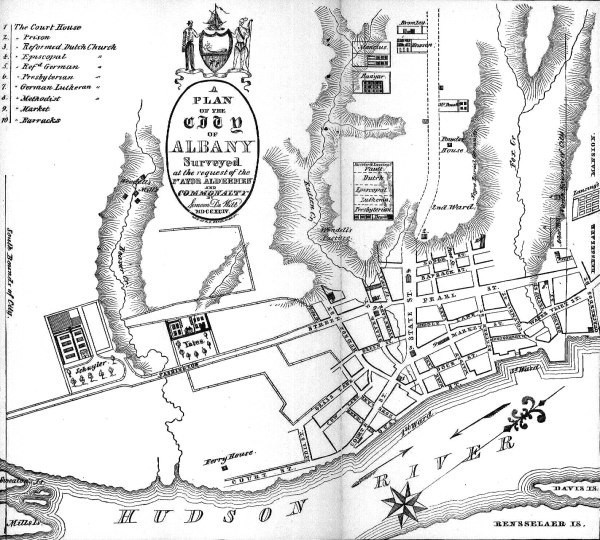
Simeon De Witt map showing King's Highway, predecessor to Washington Avenue, as a dotted line roadway.

The street was originally named King Street in 1764, then Lion in 1790, and finally Washington Avenue. As King Street, lots were sold in 1778 and residences began to line the route up to Lark Street by the 1790s. Washington Avenue as Lion (or Lyon) Street was the widest of the animal-named east–west routes in Albany. The oldest section near Downtown Albany is along the path of the King's Highway to Schenectady. It was first shown on a map by Simeon De Witt in 1794.

The Public Square at the intersection of Eagle Street, State Street, and Washington Avenue was originally the terminus of Washington Avenue. Over time the square was developed into the Capitol East Park and Academy/Lafayette Park. Prior to the completion of the Erie Canal Washington Avenue was part of the main route from New England to Central and Western New York. The avenue was at its commercial height when the canal was finished in 1823 and fell into decline.

Washington Avenue from Quail Street to Manning Boulevard was constructed in 1895 as a speedway.

Washington Avenue ended at Fuller Road until 1973, when the extension section, which continues to New York State Route 155 in the western edge of Albany, was completed.

== Route description ==
Washington Avenue begins at Eagle Street, opposite the Albany City Hall, in Downtown Albany. Heading northwest, as a four-lane road, Washington Avenue moves past the northern side of the New York State Capitol as it climbs in elevation away from the Hudson River. From its beginnings at Eagle Street, Washington Avenue carries New York State Route 5. Continuing northwestward, Washington Avenue intersects with Lark Street (US Route 9W), and then loses its designation as Route 5 to Central Avenue, which ends at the Washington intersection. After meeting Central Avenue, and intersecting Henry Johnson Boulevard, Washington Avenue runs past the SUNY Albany Downtown Campus, and forms the northern boundary of the Pine Hills neighborhood. Moving further uptown, Washington Avenue crosses over the Crosstown Arterial, New York State Route 85, while providing access to that route southbound from the westbound lanes, and northbound from the eastbound lanes. The W. Averell Harriman State Office Building Campus can be accessed from eastbound lanes and from the westbound lanes via the Patroon Creek Corporate Park. Washington Avenue continues it northwest course by paralleling Interstate 90 as a four-lane divided highway, and forms the northern boundary of the SUNY Albany Uptown Campus. Washington Avenue provides three separate entrances to the campus, as well as access to the eastbound side of Interstate 90 via that highway's Exit 2. Washington Avenue at a two-level roundabout with Fuller Road continues onwards as Washington Avenue Extension (officially known as New York State Reference Route 910D). As Washington Ave Ext, the highway continues as a four-lane divided highway, with an interchange for the Crossgates Mall in neighboring town of Guilderland, and intersections for access to several access roads parallel to the highway. The access roads have Crossgates Commons, a shopping center in the city of Albany, along with numerous business/corporate parks and the Dunes neighborhood. Washington Ave Ext ends at the intersection with New Karner Road (NY 155), with the right-of-way continuing in a business park as Madison Avenue Extension.
