= New York State Route 910D =

State highway in New York State

New York State Route 910D
- Washington Avenue Extension
- NY 910D highlighted in red

Route information
- Maintained by NYSDOT
- Length: 3.30 mi (5.31 km)
- Existed: By 1973–present

Major junctions
- West end: NY 155 / CR 157 in Albany
- East end: I-90 / CR 156 / Washington Avenue in Albany

Location
- Country: United States
- State: New York
- Counties: Albany

Highway system
- New York Highways; Interstate; US; State; Reference; Parkways

New York State Route 910D (NY 910D) is a 3.30-mile-long (5.31 km) unsigned reference route designation for Washington Avenue Extension, a limited-access extension of Washington Avenue in Albany, New York, in the United States. The state-maintained portion of the highway begins at an intersection with NY 155 (here county-maintained as County Route 157 or CR 157) and ends just east of CR 156 (Fuller Road) at Interstate 90 (I-90) exit 2. Past I-90 and University Avenue, the highway is maintained by the city of Albany and known as Washington Avenue. Washington Avenue Extension was constructed in the late 1960s and open to traffic by 1973.

== Route description ==
Washington Avenue Extension (unsigned NY 910D) begins at an intersection with NY 155 (here county-maintained as CR 157) near the western Albany city line. The highway heads southeastward as a four-lane expressway, paralleling the routing of nearby Interstate 90 (I-90) to New York State Thruway exit 24. This portion of Washington Avenue Extension is flanked on both sides by named Frontage Roads, both of which begin at NY 155. The northern road ends prior to Rapp Road while the southern road ends just short of Crossgates Mall.

At exit 24, Washington Avenue Extension dips southward to serve Crossgates Mall and avoid exit 1 on the Adirondack Northway (I-87) and the Northside Route (I-90). Past the interchange, the road returns northeastward and follows I-90 east to CR 156 (Fuller Road). From Fuller Road it continues eastward to a junction with the on-off ramps for I-90 eastbound and University Drive which leads to the University at Albany uptown campus. At this junction, state jurisdiction of Washington Avenue ends and Washington Avenue continues into downtown Albany as a city street. This section of Washington Avenue connects to the W. Averell Harriman State Office Complex, and NY 85.

While the speed limit is 45 miles per hour (72 km/h), the route is controlled by traffic signals at every intersection, save the interchange for Crossgates Mall, a grade-separated interchange. This causes traffic to flow at speeds up to 15 miles per hour (24 km/h) below the limit during peak hours. At Crossgates, Washington Avenue Extension curves southward around the exit 1 interchange of I-90 and the Northway, curving northward afterward to resume it original course.

== History ==
When the New York State Thruway was constructed near Albany in the early 1950s, exit 24 on the highway initially connected to Washington Avenue, a city street leading into downtown Albany. In the mid-1960s, the portion of Washington Avenue from the Thruway to Fuller Road was dismantled as part of the construction of the Northside Route; that is, the modern routing of I-90 through downtown Albany. At the same time, construction began on a new divided highway routing for Washington Avenue between Fuller Road and NY 155 along the southern edge of I-90. The highway, named Washington Avenue Extension, was completed by 1973 and designated as NY 910D, an unsigned reference route.

As of May 2012, major reconstruction work is well underway to realign Washington Avenue Extension to the north of the CSNE UAlbany Nanotech College complex at its intersection with Fuller Road and build a roundabout interchange. The current signalized intersection will be replaced with a two-lane roundabout with an overpass carrying Washington Avenue through traffic. When the reconstruction was completed, NY 910D was extended eastward to I-90 exit 2 and University Drive.

== Exit List ==
The entire route is in Albany, Albany County. All exits are unnumbered.

mi	km	Destinations	Notes
0.00	0.00	NY 155 (New Karner Road) / CR 157 – Voorheesville, Colonie, Airport	Western terminus
2.03	3.27	Crossgates Mall Road	To Crossgates Commons and Crossgates Mall
2.91	4.68	I-90 west / Fuller Road (CR 156) to I-87 / New York Thruway	Roundabout interchange; exit 2 on I-90
3.30	5.31	I-90 east / University Drive – UAlbany	Eastern terminus; exit 2 on I-90
3.30	5.31	Washington Avenue east	Continuation east
1.000 mi = 1.609 km; 1.000 km = 0.621 mi
