= Crossgates Commons =

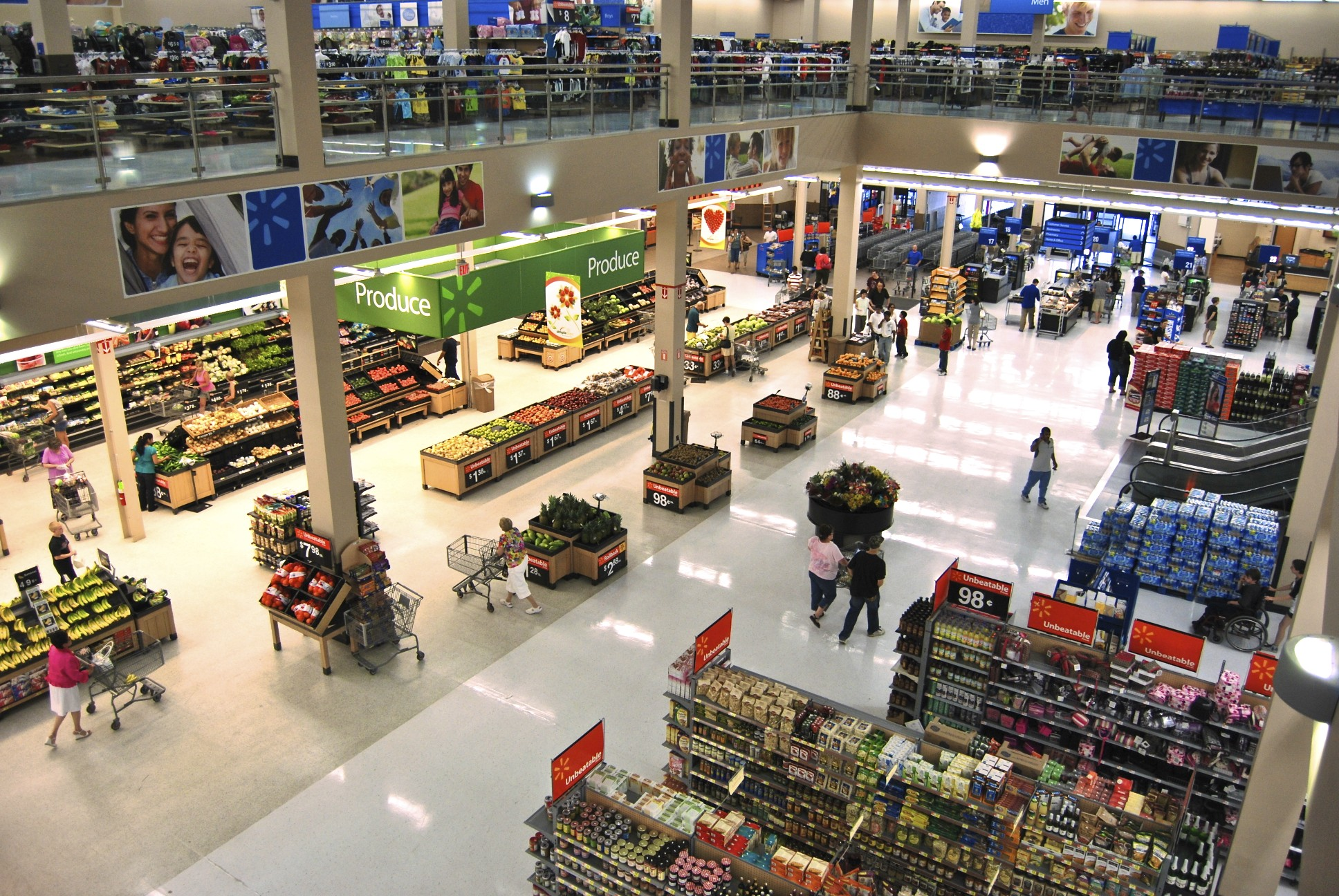
- Inside of Walmart at Crossgates Commons
- Location: Albany, New York, United States
- Coordinates: 42°41′49″N 73°50′51″W
- Opened: 1994
- Developer: The Pyramid Companies
- Manager: The Pyramid Companies
- Num. of stores: 15

Crossgates Commons is a shopping plaza in Albany, New York, along Washington Avenue Extension. It is owned and managed by Pyramid Management Group, Inc., who also own and manage the nearby Crossgates Mall.

== History ==
Crossgates Commons is built within the Albany Pine Bush, one of the largest of the world's 20 inland pine barrens. When Europeans arrived in the early 17th century, the Pine Bush was in use as hunting grounds and firewood supply of the Mohawk nation of the Haudenosaunee to the west along the Mohawk River, and the Mahican to the east, along the Hudson River. One of the largest remaining remnants of the Pine Bush is located across Washington Avenue from the plaza, and is managed as the Pine Bush Preserve.

When the shopping center first opened in 1994, it had six original tenants: Walmart (then branded as Wal-Mart), Sam's Club, Home Depot, Media Play, Old Navy, and MJ Designs.

On May 1, 2006, the Sam's Club at Crossgates Commons closed in favor of the nearby Latham branch.

The Walmart located at Crossgates Commons became the largest Walmart in the United States (and the largest outside of China) in 2008, when it expanded into a Walmart Supercenter, now occupying 260,000 square feet (24,000 m^{2}) over two floors.

== Description ==
The shopping center has a split-level design with stores on the upper level accessible from the front and stores on the lower level accessible from the rear. It opened in 1994 and has 1,300,000 square feet (120,000 m^{2}) of retail space. Although Crossgates Commons is relatively young, it has already undergone an expansion, and some locations have had high turnover rates.
