= Westmere, New York =

- Hamlet and CDP
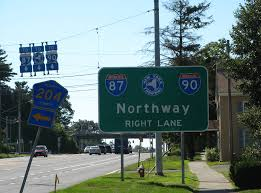

- Location in Albany County and the state of New York
- Coordinates: 42°41′29″N 73°52′34″W
- Country: United States
- State: New York
- Region: Capital District
- County: Albany
- Town: Guilderland
- Settled: 1920s

Area
  - Total: 3.18 sq mi (8.23 km^{2})
  - Land: 3.17 sq mi (8.21 km^{2})
  - Water: 0.012 sq mi (0.03 km^{2})
- Elevation: 292 ft (89 m)

Population (2020)
  - Total: 7,560
  - Density: 2,385.5/sq mi (921.03/km^{2})
- Time zone: UTC-5 (EST)
  - Summer (DST): UTC-4 (EDT)
- ZIP Codes: 12203 (Albany); 12084 (Guilderland); 12159 (Slingerlands)
- Area code: 518
- FIPS code: 36-80423
- GNIS feature ID: 0970925

Westmere is a hamlet in the town of Guilderland, Albany County, New York, United States. Since the 1970 Census, a census-designated place (CDP) has been established with the name of Westmere for tabulating the population of what the census has defined as the boundaries for Westmere. As of the 2020 census, Westmere had a population of 7,560. It is a suburb of the neighboring city of Albany. U.S. Route 20 (Western Avenue) bisects the community and is the major thoroughfare and main street. Along Western Avenue are numerous strip malls, shopping plazas, and commercial buildings, with residential use on the side streets to the north and south. Crossgates Mall, the Capital District's largest shopping mall, is in Westmere's northeastern corner.

== History ==
Westmere as a settled place is of recent origin, though being along the Great Western Turnpike, built in 1799, it was always a place migrants passed through on their way from Albany and New England to the western frontier. A toll gate existed on the turnpike roughly where Highland Estates is located. Even before the turnpike was built, 300 wagons (and sleighs in the winter) passed through in 1796 what would later become Westmere. After World War I, development began to encroach on the rural wooded area with mostly bungalows and cottages. This would accelerate in the post-war era after World War II, and in the 1940s is when the name Westmere would be given to this area. Westmere was the fastest growing section of the town of Guilderland in this period.

== Geography ==
As a hamlet, the borders of Westmere are only loosely defined. As a census-designated place (CDP) however, the borders (as of the 2010 census) are exactly defined as the city of Albany to the north, then following New York Route 155 (State Farm Road/New Karner Road) as the western border. The southern border follows Doctor Shaw Road from its intersection with NY 155, then turns northeast onto Veeder Road until its termination with Johnston Road. At Johnston Road, the border turns north and follows it until it takes a right onto Church Road and follows it to the intersection with U.S. Route 20 (Western Avenue). The border then takes a right on Western Avenue to the Governor Thomas E. Dewey Thruway (Interstate 87) and goes north to the Albany city line. These borders can change from census to census. According to the United States Census Bureau in 2000, the CDP has a total area of 3.2 square miles (8.3 km^{2}), all land.

== Demographics ==
Westmere CDP Historical Populations
Year	Pop.	±%
1970	6,364	—
1980	6,881	+8.1%
1990	6,750	−1.9%
2000	7,188	+6.5%
2010	7,284	+1.3%
2020	7,560	+3.8%
Source: U.S. Decennial Census

As of the census of 2000, there were 7,188 people, 3,162 households, and 1,903 families residing in the CDP. The population density was 2,259.8 inhabitants per square mile (872.5/km^{2}). There were 3,287 housing units at an average density of 1,033.4 per square mile (399.0/km^{2}). The racial makeup of the CDP was 88.75% White, 3.62% African American, 0.04% Native American, 6.25% Asian, 0.03% Pacific Islander, 0.43% from other races, and 0.89% from two or more races. Hispanic or Latino of any race were 2.00% of the population.

There were 3,162 households, out of which 26.6% had children under the age of 18 living with them, 48.1% were married couples living together, 9.2% had a female householder with no husband present, and 39.8% were non-families. 32.4% of all households were made up of individuals, and 10.3% had someone living alone who was 65 years of age or older. The average household size was 2.25 and the average family size was 2.90.

In the CDP, the population was spread out, with 21.1% under the age of 18, 6.6% from 18 to 24, 31.7% from 25 to 44, 24.9% from 45 to 64, and 15.7% who were 65 years of age or older. The median age was 40 years. For every 100 females, there were 90.6 males. For every 100 females age 18 and over, there were 87.8 males.

The median income for a household in the CDP was $55,000, and the median income for a family was $61,827. Males had a median income of $45,769 versus $32,937 for females. The per capita income for the CDP was $28,790. About 3.0% of families and 4.1% of the population were below the poverty line, including 2.5% of those under age 18 and 4.4% of those age 65 or over.

== Fire Protection ==
The Westmere Fire Department was formally incorporated on December 31, 1935, for the protection of the residents of the community. In 1937, the Westmere Fire District was recognized by the New York State Comptroller. Today, the Westmere Fire Department continues to be 100% volunteer, with over 50 active firefighters volunteering at the busiest fire department in the Town of Guilderland. The department operates with three fire engines, a tower-ladder, one heavy-rescue truck, a multi-purpose pickup truck, and two command vehicles.
