= Capital District Transportation Authority =

Public transport operator in the New York Capital District

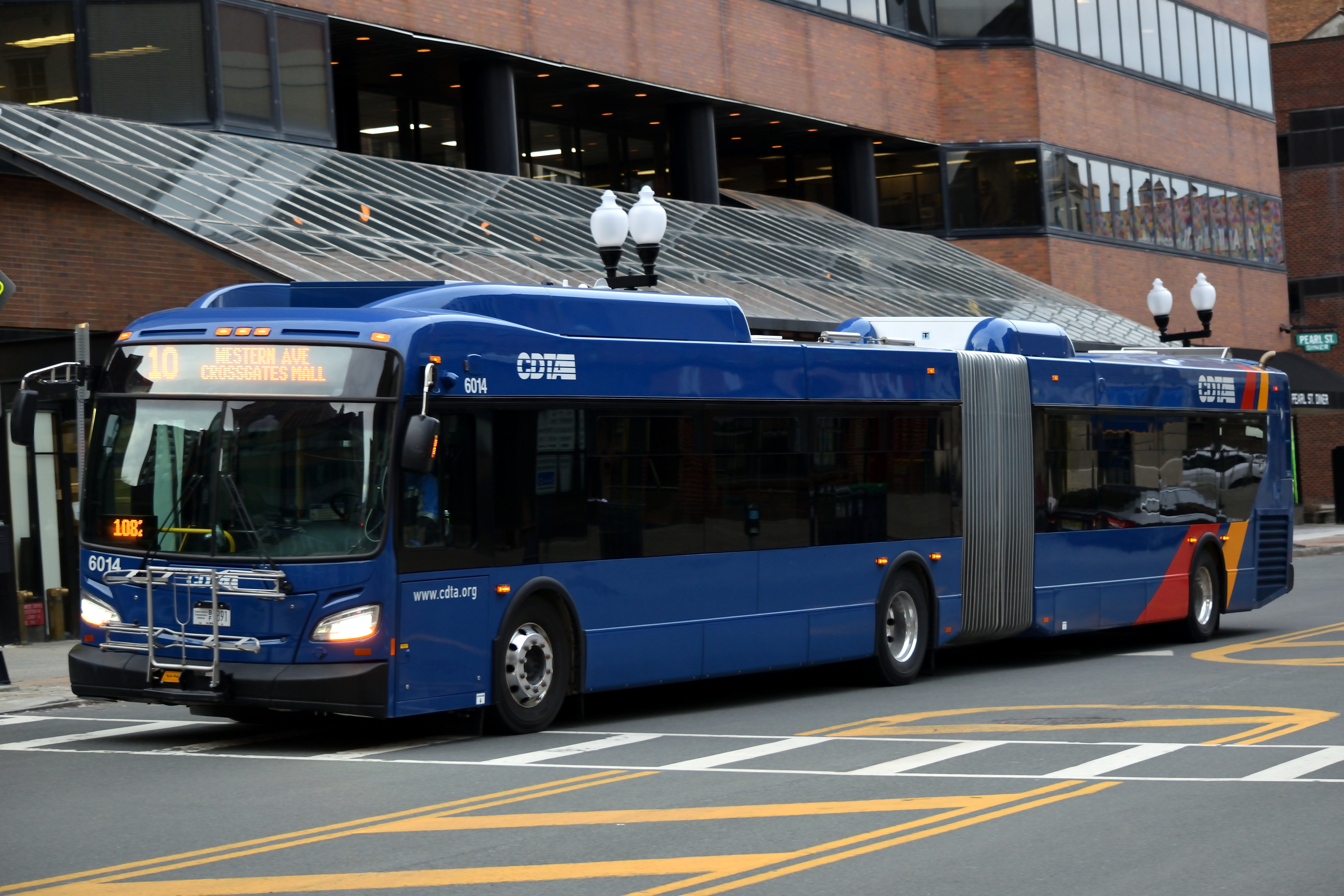
- An articulated bus on CDTA route 10
- Founded: 1970 (previously United Traction Company in 1890)
- Headquarters: 110 Watervliet Avenue; Albany, New York
- Locale: Capital District
- Service area: Albany, Rensselaer, Schenectady, Saratoga, Montgomery, Washington, and Warren counties
- Service type: Local bus service express bus service commuter coach service bus rapid transit paratransit (STAR)
- Routes: 63
- Stops: 2,640
- Depots: Albany Depot: 110 Watervliet Avenue, Albany NY; Troy Depot: 40 Hoosick Street, Troy NY, Schenectady Depot: 2401 Maxon Rd. Schenectady NY; Upstate Transit of Saratoga: 207 Geyser Rd. Saratoga Springs NY; Brown Transportation: (Only for storing #560 MCI's):50 Venner Rd. Amsterdam NY, Warren and Washington Counties (Glens Falls/Hudson Falls) Depot: 495 Queensbury Ave, Queensbury, NY 12804 Amsterdam Division (for 600 and 601) 1430 NY-5S Amsterdam NY 12010
- Fleet: 292
- Daily ridership: 59,700 (weekdays, Q2 2026)
- Annual ridership: 18,238,800 (2025)
- Fuel type: Diesel, diesel-electric hybrid, Battery electric
- Operator: CDTA (all except Northway Express); Upstate Transit (Northway Express only); Brown Transportation (Thruway Express only)
- Chief executive: Frank Annicaro
- Website: cdta.org

The Capital District Transportation Authority (CDTA) is a New York State public-benefit corporation providing transit services across the Capital District of New York State (Albany, Montgomery, Rensselaer, Saratoga, Schenectady, Warren, and Washington counties). CDTA runs local and express buses, including four lines of an express bus service called BusPlus (905, 910, 922, 923), and manages three Amtrak stations in the Capital region–the Albany-Rensselaer, Schenectady and Saratoga Springs Amtrak stations. In 2025, the system had a ridership of 18,238,800, or about 59,700 per weekday as of the second quarter of 2026.

Created as an act of the New York State Legislature in August 1970, CDTA was formed similarly to agencies in Syracuse, Rochester, and Buffalo. In 1970, CDTA purchased and took over management of the United Traction Company and Schenectady Transit.

CDTA bus operators, dispatchers, and supervisory staff are organized in Local 1321 of the Amalgamated Transit Union (ATU).

== Governance ==
CDTA is overseen by a nine-member board of directors.

Currently, the board is represented of:

- Three members representing Albany County
- Two members representing Rensselaer County
- One member representing Schenectady County
- Two members representing Saratoga County
- One member (non-voting) representing the labor unions

There is also an executive director that handles day-to-day business, reporting to the board of directors. In 2017, the CDTA had operating expenses of $108.41 million and a level of staffing of 821 people.

== Fixed route services ==
System map showing service frequency (data from November 2009–March 2010)

CDTA operates ~60 routes, connecting neighborhoods, shopping centers, colleges, and major regional hubs. Services generally run: Weekdays: 4:00am – 1:00am, Saturdays: 4:00am – 12:30 AM, Sundays: 6:00am – 12:30 AM

College routes often run later, up to 2:00 AM in Albany and Troy.

=== Albany Division ===
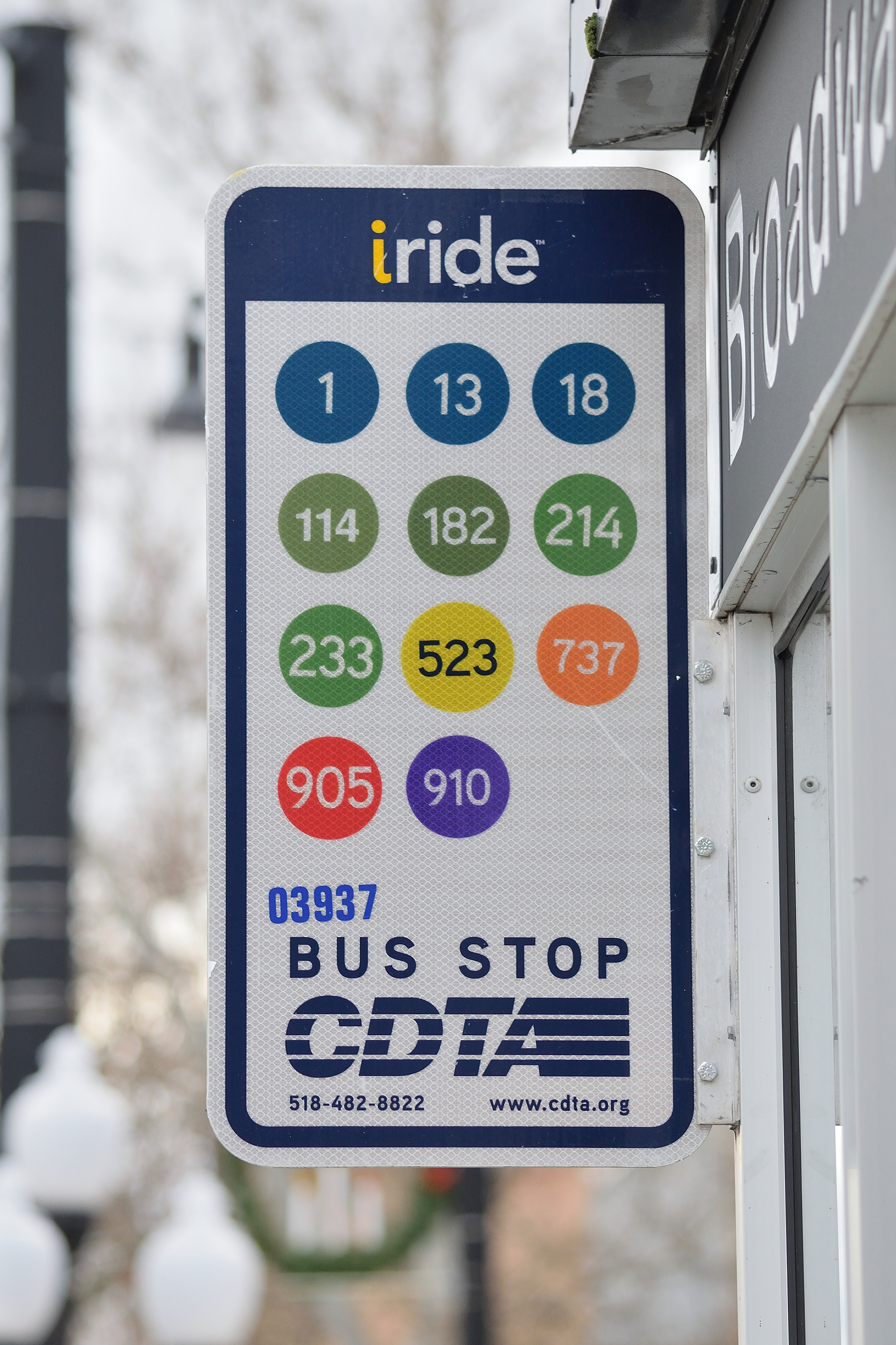
A CDTA bus stop sign

The Albany Division, based at CDTA's Watervliet Avenue headquarters, includes routes originally operated by United Traction and Albany-Nassau Bus.

In early 2011, CDTA announced its plans to restructure the Albany County bus routes in two phases. Its goal was to have a more uniformed bus system without any route deviation. Phase 1 involved reconstructing routes within the city of Albany. The results were five new neighborhood routes and three commuter routes. Phase 1 of the reconstructing went into effect on November 13, 2011. In August 2012, CDTA revealed the draft plan for Phase 2 of the reconstructing. Phase 2 involved reconstructing routes within the western and northern portions of Albany County, with a public input campaign held until September 2012. Phase 2 of the reconstructing went into effect on November 11, 2012.

Route	Terminals		Major streets	Notes
1	Albany Bus Terminal Madison & Green	Colonie Station Wolf Rd. & Colonie Center	Central Ave., NY 5	Rt. 5 local service between Downtown Albany and Colonie Center, interlined with 355, split with Schenectady Division.
10	Broadway & Steuben St. Broadway & Orange St.	Crossgates Mall	Western Ave., Rt. 20	Rt. 20 local service between Downtown Albany and Crossgates Mall
12	Broadway & Steuben St. Broadway & Orange	Crossgates Mall	Washington Ave.	
13	Albany Bus Terminal Madison & Green	Price Chopper/ Shoprite (Slingerlands)	New Scotland Ave., Lark St., NY 85	
18	Albany Bus Terminal Madison & Green	Price Chopper/ Shoprite (Slingerlands)	Delaware Ave., Lark St., Cherry Ave., NY 443	
22	River St. & Front St.	Madison Ave. & Empire State Plaza, Albany	Broadway, NY 32	Rt. 32 local service between Downtown Albany and Downtown Troy. Split with Troy Division.
87	River St. & Front St.	Walmart – Brunswick Plaza	Hoosick St. & 15th St.	Split with Troy Division.
100	Clinton Square Station S. Pearl St & Dunn Memorial Bridge	S. Pearl St & Beaver St.	Pearl St., Morton Ave, Quail St., Livingston Ave, and Lark Dr.	Mid City Belt
106	Clinton Square Station S. Pearl St & Dunn Memorial Bridge	S. Pearl St & Beaver St	Pearl St, 2nd Ave, Whitehall Rd. Allen St. Livingston Ave, Lark Dr	Uptown Belt
107	Clinton Square Station	Glenmont Price Chopper	South Pearl St., Mt. Hope Dr., Route 9W	
114	UAlbany Health Science Campus Rensselaer Rail Station	Crossgates Mall	Third St., Western Ave., Madison Ave.	Limited service beyond Rensselaer Rail Station
117	Crossgates Mall	Rt 7 & Ronald Dr	Western Ave., Fuller Rd., Wolf Rd.,	Colonie crosstown. Airport service
125	Albany Bus Terminal	Colonie Station	Sand Creek Rd., Everett Rd., Clinton Ave.	No Sunday service
155	Crossgates Mall	Shaker Place	via Albany Airport, Rt 155	Runs twice a day on weekends only
214	Empire State Plaza Concourse Broadway & Hudson Ave.	East Greenbush Tech Park	Washington Ave., 3rd St.	Stops at ESP weekdays only
224	River St. & Front St.	Empire State Plaza Concourse	I-787, I-90, Rt. 4	No weekend service Does not serve downtown Troy after 7:30 pm, ends at HVCC. Split with Troy Division.
233	Empire State Plaza Concourse Broadway & Hudson Ave.	Schodack Park & Ride	Rt. 9, Rt. 20	Stops at ESP Weekdays only
355	Gateway Plaza	Central Ave. & Colonie Center	State St., Central Ave., NY 5	Rt. 5 local service between Downtown Schenectady and Colonie Center, interlined with 1, split with Schenectady Division.
370	River St. & Front St., Troy	Rivers Casino, Erie Blvd Schenectady	NY 2, Union St., NY 7	Split with Schenectady and Troy Divisions.
519	Empire State Plaza Concourse	Elm Avenue Park & Ride	Rt. 20, NY 146, NY 156, NY 85, I-787	Weekday express service only
524	Empire State Concourse/South Swan St. & Washington Ave.	80 Broadway Lot	I-787	Weekday express service only
712	Quail/WAMC Station	SUNY Collins Circle	Washington Ave., Colvin Ave., Central Ave.	Limited weekday service only – provides service to the Harriman State Office Campus
737	Albany Bus Terminal Madison Ave & Green St	Atrium Dr & Palisade Dr Albany International Airport 19 British American Blvd	Albany Shaker Rd., Everett Rd., Henry Johnson Blvd.	Downtown to airport, limited weekday service only
801	(many routes)	Myers Middle School		Only available for students and when school is in session
805	(many routes)	Albany High School		Only available for students and when school is in session
813	Church St. & 5th St.	Wolf Rd. & Colonie Center	I87, I90, Rt 85, Wolf Rd.	Runs only on Tuesday. Ravena Shopping Bus.
872	Six Mile Waterworks Park Watervilet & Essex	Five Rivers Education Center Thatcher State Park	Livingston Ave, Pearl St, 2nd Ave, Delaware Ave	Free Seasonal Nature Bus, runs Staurdays only, alternates destination
910	Albany Bus Terminal	Crossgates Mall	Washington Ave, State St., Western Ave	Rt. 20 BusPlus service between Downtown Albany and Crossgates Mall, with only 16 stops per trip.

Former bus routes that were part of the Albany Division include:

- #2 - West Albany (discontinued in November 2011 during Phase 1 of the Albany County Route Restructuring)
- #3 - Quail Street (discontinued in November 2011 during Phase 1 of the Albany County Route Restructuring)
- #4 - Pine Hills (discontinued in November 2011 during Phase 1 of the Albany County Route Restructuring)
- #5 - Northern Boulevard (discontinued in May 2009 due to low ridership; merged with Route #6)
- Old #6 - Second Avenue (split into two routes, new #6 and #116, in November 2011 during Phase 1 of the Albany County Route Restructuring)
- New #6 - Second/Whitehall (merged with Route #138 in November 2020 to form #106)
- #7 - Glenmont (Restructured into Route #107 in November 2020)
- #8 - Arbor Hill (discontinued in November 2011 during Phase 1 of the Albany County Route Restructuring)
- #9 - Whitehall Road (discontinued in November 2011 during Phase 1 of the Albany County Route Restructuring)
- #14 - Rensselaer Third Street - Amtrak (merged with Route #15 to form Route #214 in May 2009)
- #15 - Rensselaer East Street (merged with Route #14 to form Route #214 in May 2009)
- #16 - Downtown Albany Circulator (discontinued in January 2009 due to low ridership)
- #17 - Four Mall Circuit (merged with Route #90 Troy/Latham in the 1990s)
- #19 - Voorheesvile Express (discontinued in November 2012 during Phase 2 of the Albany County Route Restructuring)
- #20 - Downtown Albany Circulator East Parking Garage (discontinued on May 23, 2004, due to low ridership)
- #21 - Altamont Express (discontinued in November 2012 during Phase 2 of the Albany County Route Restructuring)
- #23 - Albany-Troy via Menands Bridge (discontinued in 2002 due to low ridership)
- #24 - Albany/Troy via Rensselaer (renumbered Route #224 in September 2009)
- #25 - West Sand Lake/Averill Park (discontinued during the 1990s)
- #26 - Albany-Cohoes via Broadway (merged into Route 82 during the 1990s)
- #27 - Corporate Woods (Merged into Route 4 in January 2010; resplit in April 2011 discontinued in November 2011 during Phase 1 of the Albany County Route Restructuring)
- #30 - Hackett Blvd (discontinued in November 2011 during Phase 1 of the Albany County Route Restructuring)
- #31 - Albany Shaker Road (discontinued in November 2011 during Phase 1 of the Albany County Route Restructuring)
- #32 - Hampton Manor (renumbered Route #232 in May 2009)
- #33 - Albany/Nassau (renumbered Route #233 in May 2009)
- #33x - Albany/Nassau express (renumbered Route #520 in May 2009)
- #34 - Albany/Castleton (discontinued in May 2009 due to low ridership)
- #116 - Mt Hope / Albany South End (renumbered Route #716)
- #138 - Allen St. / Livingston Ave. (merged with new #6 in November 2020 to form #106)
- #232 - Hampton Manor (discontinued in May 2012 due to low ridership)
- #610 - Shuttle Fly (Colonie Center, Wolf Rd to Rt. 7 - discontinued in November 2012 during Phase 2 of the Albany County Route Restructuring)
- #611 - Shuttle Bug (Crossgates Mall to Twenty Mall - discontinued in November 2012 during Phase 2 of the Albany County Route Restructuring)
- #612 - Shuttle Bug (Crossgates Mall to Central Ave - discontinued in November 2012 during Phase 2 of the Albany County Route Restructuring)
- #716 - Mt. Hope/Albany South End (eliminated in November 2020 due to implementation of River Corridor BRT routes #922 and #923)
- #810 - Berne/Knox rural shuttle (discontinued in August 2012 due to low ridership)
- #811 - Westerlo rural shuttle (discontinued in September 2009 due to low ridership)
- #812 - Rensselaerville rural shuttle (discontinued in August 2012 due to low ridership)

=== Schenectady Division ===
In 2010, CDTA restructured Schenectady service, replacing several older routes (51, 52, 53, 54, etc.) with new cross-town routes 351, 352, 353, 354, and 358, though Route 358 was later cut due to low ridership. This was part of a shift to a new three-digit route numbering system.

CDTA also introduced express routes 530, 531, and 532 from Schenectady to Downtown Albany, which replaced the former 55x route. These buses did not accept local passengers. Routes 531 and 532 were eventually consolidated and discontinued, while Route 530 became part of Route 560, the Thruway Express to Montgomery County, launched in 2022.

Route	Terminals		Major streets	Notes
1	Albany Bus Terminal Madison & Green	Colonie Station Wolf Rd. & Colonie Center	Central Ave., NY 5	Rt. 5 local service between Downtown Albany and Colonie Center, interlined with 355, split with Albany Division.
351	Golub Corp.	Gerling St. & Sheridan Ave.	Broadway, Van Vranken Ave.	
353	Walmart – Glenville	Price Chopper – Altamont Ave.	Mohawk Ave.	
355	Gateway Plaza	Central Ave. & Colonie Center	State St., Central Ave., NY 5	Rt. 5 local service between Downtown Schenectady and Colonie Center, interlined with 1, split with Albany Division.
370	River St. & Front St., Troy	Rivers Casino, Erie Blvd Schenectady	NY 2, Union St., NY 7	Split with Albany and Troy Divisions.
560 (TX)	Main St. & Market St.	Kiernan Plaza	I-787, I-90	Weekday express service only
763	Liberty Park	Crossgates Mall Station	Western Ave., Rt. 20, Curry Rd., Broadway	Limited weekday service only
810	(many routes)	Schenectady High School		Only available for students and when school is in session
905	Gateway Plaza	Albany Bus Terminal	State St., Central Ave., NY 5	Rt. 5 Bus Plus service between Downtown Schenectady and Downtown Albany, with only 19 stops per trip

Former bus routes that were part of the Schenectady Division include:

- Old #50 - Route 50 (merged with Route #71 in July 2007 as part of the Saratoga Springs Route Expansion)
- #51 - Broadway (discontinued in May 2010 as part of the Schenectady Route Restructuring)
- Old #52 - Scotia/Crane St. (split up into two routes, new Route #52 Crane St. and new Route #54 Scotia/Walmart in January 2004)
- New #52 - Crane St. (discontinued in May 2010 as part of the Schenectady Route Restructuring)
- #53 - Altamont Ave (discontinued in May 2010 as part of the Schenectady Route Restructuring)
- Old #54 - Kings Rd. (discontinued during the 1990s)
- New #54 - Scotia/Walmart (discontinued in May 2010 as part of the Schenectady Route Restructuring)
- #55 - Schenectady/Albany (renumbered Route #355 and shortened to run between Schenectady and Colonie Center in April 2011, during implementation of Rt. 5 Bus Plus service)
- #55x - Schenectady/Albany Express (discontinued in April 2011, during implementation of Rt. 5 Bus Plus service)
- #56x - Schenectady/State Office Campus Express (discontinued in August 2010 due to low ridership)
- #58 - Union St./Mohawk Mall (discontinued during the 1990s)
- #59 - Nott St. (discontinued in May 2010 as part of the Schenectady Route Restructuring)
- #60 - Rosa Rd. (merged with Route #61 Van Vranken Ave. during the 1990s)
- #61 - Van Vraken Ave. (discontinued in May 2010 as part of the Schenectady Route Restructuring)
- #62 - McClellan St./Rotterdam Square Mall (discontinued in May 2010 as part of the Schenectady Route Restructuring)
- #63 - Route Twenty (renumbered Route #763 in November 2012 during Phase 2 of the Albany County Route Restructuring)
- #64 - Charlton (discontinued during the 1990s)
- #66 - Schenectady South Loop (discontinued in May 2010 as part of the Schenectady Route Restructuring)
- #70 - Schenectady/Troy (renumbered Route #370 in November 2012 during Phase 2 of the Albany County Route Restructuring))
- #77 - Schenectady North Loop (discontinued in May 2010 as part of the Schenectady Route Restructuring)
- #78 - Schenectady West Loop (discontinued in May 2009 due to low ridership)
- #95 - Duanesburg/Delanson rural service (separated into four distinct routes, Routes #810, #811, #812 and #830 in January 2009)
- #96 - Rensselaer rural service, with summer Grafton State Park service (discontinued in August 2011 due to low ridership)
- #352 - McClellan St/Altamount Ave (discontinued in November 2025 due to low ridership)
- #354 - Rotterdam Square Mall/Nott Street (merged with Route #602 to create Route #605 in November 2025)
- #358 - Hamburg St./McClellan St. (Replaced parts of Routes #53, #59, #61 and #62 in May 2010; discontinued in April 2011 due to low ridership)
- #530 - Exit 26/Via Port Rotterdam Express (replaced by Route 560 in August 2022)
- #531 - St. Luke's Express (discontinued in April 2020)
- #532 - Woodlawn Express (merged with Route #531 St. Luke's Express in November 2011)
- Original #830 - Duanesburg rural shuttle (discontinued in September 2009 due to low ridership)
- Recent #830 - Schenectady Shopping Bus (eliminated in 2025 due to low ridership

=== Saratoga Division ===
Saratoga Springs routes operate from CDTA's Schenectady Division and run seven days a week. Before 2007, service was limited and operated out of the Uncle Sam Depot in Troy, with no direct connection to the rest of the CDTA network. Route 50 service was operated out of Schenectady with only one weekday AM and one weekday PM trip as far north as Ballston Spa.

On July 2, 2007, Route 50 was expanded and began running hourly between Schenectady and Wilton Mall, with several local deviations including Rowland St and Geyser Rd in Milton. Service was centralized out of the Electric Depot in Schenectady.

In 2016, CDTA restructured the system: Route 50 became Route 450, now running along NY 50 without deviations. New Routes 451 and 452 absorbed former deviations and replaced portions of Routes 472 and 473.

In 2025, Routes 451 and 452 were discontinued, "except for late night Skidmore trips on Thursday, Friday, and Saturday nights" and replaced with Flex service.

Route	Terminals		Major streets	Notes
450	Gateway Plaza	Wilton Mall	NY 50, Broadway	Split with Glens Falls Division
452	Skidmore College	Skidmore College	Excelsior Ave., Broadway, Clinton St.	Late night shuttle, runs Thursday-Saturday only
840	Stonequist Apartments	Wilton Mall	Union Ave.	Shopping shuttle, Runs on Tuesdays only.
875	Saratoga Casino and Raceway	Courtyard Hotel, Saratoga Springs	Broadway, Nelson Ave., Jefferson St., Avenue of the Pines	Seasonal trolley operates from Memorial Day weekend to Labor Day. Wed - Sun only
NX (540)	Empire State Plaza, Albany	Milton Town Hall/ Exit 9 - Crossing Park & Ride - Clifton Park/ Route 50 & High Street - Ballston Spa	I-87, I-787	Weekday express service only

Former Saratoga Springs bus routes that were operated by the Schenectady Division include:

- New #50 - Route 50 (replaced by Route #450 in May 2016 as part of the Saratoga Springs restructure plan)
- #409 - federally founded pilot service on Rt. 9 between Saratoga Springs and Clifton Park (launched on May 24, 2010, with a minimum ridership of 15 passengers per hour needed. Discontinued on September 2, 2011, because it did not maintain the above ridership quota.)
- #451 - Ballston Ave./West Saratoga (discontinued in November 2025 due to low ridership)
- #471 - Union Ave. (discontinued in September 2010 due to low ridership)
- #472 - Lake Ave. (discontinued in May 2016 as part of the Saratoga Springs restructure plan)
- #473 - Jefferson St./Skidmore College (discontinued in May 2016 as part of the Saratoga Springs restructure plan)
- #474 - Saratoga Springs City Shuttle (discontinued in May 2009 due to low ridership)
- #870 - Saratoga County Shuttle (provided rural service to Galway, Wilton, Schuylerville and Round Lake - discontinued in May 2012 due to low ridership)

Former Saratoga Springs bus routes that were operated by the Troy Division include:

- #71 - Saratoga Springs/Ballston Spa (merged with Route #50 in July 2007 as part of the Saratoga Springs Route Expansion)
- #72 - Saratoga Springs City Bus (discontinued in July 2007 as part of the Saratoga Springs Route Expansion)
- #73 - Victory Mills/Galway/Saratoga Springs (discontinued in July 2007 as part of the Saratoga Springs Route Expansion)
- #97 - Saratoga Springs/Ballston Spa (Renumbered Route 71 in 2002)
- #98 - Saratoga Springs City Bus (Renumbered Route 72 in 2002)

=== Troy Division ===
Before CDTA, most of these routes were operated by the United Traction Co and the Troy-Fifth Avenue Bus Company. Buses run from the Uncle Sam Depot at 40 Hoosick Street in Troy, which also used to operate Saratoga Springs service prior to July 2007.

Route	Terminals		Major streets	Notes
22	River St. & Front St.	Madison Ave. & Empire State Plaza, Albany	Broadway, NY 32	Rt. 32 local service between Downtown Albany and Downtown Troy Split with Albany Division.
85	Northern Dr. & 8th Ave	Hudson Valley Community College	Rt. 4	
87	River St. & Front St.	Walmart – Brunswick Plaza	Hoosick St. & 15th St.	Split with Albany Division.
96	River St. & Front St	Grafton Lakes State Park	Hoosick St, & NY 2.	Seasonal Service (Summers only) 7 Days a week
182	River St. & Front St.	Albany Bus Terminal Madison & Green	Henry Johnson Blvd., Van Rensselaer Blvd., Northern Blvd., Rt. 9, Columbia St., NY 32	Runs seven days a week between Downtown Albany, Latham Farms, Cohoes, Green Island, Watervliet and Troy
190	Latham Farms Shopping Center	Crossgates Mall	Wade Rd., Wolf Rd., Fuller Rd.	No weekend service
224	River St. & Front St.	Empire State Plaza Concourse	I-787, I-90, Rt. 4	No weekend service Does not serve downtown Troy after 7:30 pm, ends at HVCC. Split with Albany Division.
286	River & Front St. / Sunset Dr. & Forsyth Terrace	Vanderheyden Hall / Myrtle Ave & Pawling Ave	Pawling Ave., 15th St., Congress St.	No Sunday service
289	Madison Ave. & Project St.	15th St. & Massachusetts Ave. 15th St. & Park Blvd	Pawling Ave., 4th St., 15th St.	
370	River St. & Front St., Troy	Rivers Casino, Erie Blvd Schenectady	NY 2, Union St., NY 7	Split with Albany and Schenectady Divisions.
802	Troy High School	(many routes)		Only available for students and when school is in session
815	Lansingburgh Apartments	Walmart/Brunswick Plaza	Hoosick, River St., 2nd Ave	Runs only on Wednesday. Troy Shopping Bus.
821	Target & Rensselaer Plaza	St. Jude Senior Apts	Bloomingrove Dr.	Runs only on Thursday. North Greenbush Shopping Bus.
922	Canal Square – Downtown Cohoes	Whitehall Rd & Delaware Ave, Albany	Ontario St, Rt 4, Rt 32 and 2nd Ave	Rt. 32 Bus Plus service between Albany and Downtown Cohoes, with only 26 stops per trip
923	Broad St & 4th St, Waterford	Albany County Rail Trail	Rt 4, Rt 32	Rt. 32 Bus Plus service between Albany and Downtown Waterford, with only 27 stops per trip

Former routes that were part of the Troy Division include:

- #24 - Albany/Troy via Rensselaer (renumbered Route #224 in September 2009)
- #29 - Albany/Cohoes via Route 9 (renumbered Route #129 in November 2012 during phase 2 of the Albany County Route Restructuring)
- #35x - I-787 express (discontinued in November 2012 during Phase 2 of the Albany County Route Restructuring)
- #80 - Troy/5th Ave (eliminated and replaced with Route #85 in November 2020)
- #81 - Baker Street (discontinued in September 2001)
- #82 - Troy/Cohoes/Green Island (discontinued in November 2012 during Phase 2 of the Albany County Route Restructuring)
- #84 - Watervliet Belt (merged with Route #89 to form Route #289 in September 2009)
- Old #86 - Sycaway (combined with Route #87 Beman Park circa 1990)
- New #86 - RPI Shuttle (renumbered Route #286 RPI Shuttle in September 2009)
- #88 - Troy/Mechanicville/Stillwater (discontinued during the mid-1990s due to low ridership)
- #89 - Griswold Heights (merged with Route #84 to form Route #289 in September 2009)
- Old #90 - Troy/Latham (merged with Route #17, Four Mall Circuit in the 1990s)
- New #90 - Troy/Latham/Crossgates (discontinued in November 2012 during Phase 2 of the Albany County Route Restructuring)
- #90x - Troy/State Office Campus Express (discontinued in November 2010 due to low ridership)
- #129 - Albany/Latham Farms (replaced part of Route #29 in November 2012; merged with Route #182 in May 2013)
- #280 - Troy/Wynantskill (merged with route #286 in September 2016)
- Old #286 - RPI Shuttle (merged with route #280 in September 2016)
- #288 - RPI Uptown Shuttle (Discontinued in late-2020)
- #432 - Troy/Mechanicville (discontinued in May 2012 due to low ridership)
- #620 - Shuttle Bee (Route 4, Hannaford Plaza to HVCC - discontinued in May 2011 due to low ridership)

=== Amsterdam Division ===
CDTA began Montgomery County Service on August 28, 2022, after the City of Amsterdam discontinued its municipal bus service in 2018. The new service included new Route 602 to run along Route 5 to Schenectady, connecting Amsterdam to its fixed route system. The takeover also included the introduction of the TX: Thruway Express, which provides commuter express service from Amsterdam to Albany; similar to its Northway Express service in Saratoga County. In November 2025, CDTA merged Route 602 with Route 354 to create Route 605 (which operates from St. James Plaza in Niskayuna via Nott St. to Downtown Schenectady and Via Port Rotterdam before continuing to Amsterdam). CDTA will replace Routes #600 and #601 with FLEX service in November 2026.

Route	Terminals		Major streets	Notes
600	Amsterdam High School		Perth Rd, Guy Park Ave/Division St., E. Main Street, Church St. Clizbe Ave	Neighborhood belt
601	Amsterdam High School	Destefano Ave & Barkley Elementary	Midline Rd, Perth Rd., Rt. 30	No Sunday service
605	St. Mary's Hospital	Nott St. & St. James Plaza	Guy Park Ave/ Division St, E. Main St. NY 5	Replaced Route 602

Former routes that were part of the Amsterdam Division include:

- #602 - Schenectady/Amsterdam (merged with Route #354 to create Route #605 in November 2025)

=== Glens Falls Division ===
CDTA officially took over the former Greater Glens Falls Transit bus company on January 1, 2024. Upon the takeover, CDTA left all of the former Greater Glens Falls Transit routes the same, only changing the route numbers to match its new three-digit route identification. The routes service Warren, Washington and northern Saratoga Counties. On April 1, 2025, CDTA upgraded the fare structure in its Glens Falls Division to align with the rest of its fixed route system. On August 24, 2025, Route #713 was created, to Glens Falls with Saratoga Springs; connecting Warren and Washington Counties to its fixed route system. CDTA restructured its Glens Falls routes in August 2026. Route #402 was extended to replace parts of Route #407, Route #405 was discontinued, several routes received frequency upgrades and Route #411 gained Sunday service.

Route	Terminals		Major streets	Notes
402	Hannaford	SUNY Adirondack	Bay St., Bay Rd.	Weekdays Only
404	Ridge St. Terminal	Fort Edward Amtrak	Main St, Blvd, Warren St, Maple St, Ridge St, Dix Ave.	No Sunday service
407	Ridge St. Terminal	Van Dunsen Rd. & Luzerne Rd.	Broad St, Luzerne Rd, Van Dunsen Rd, Corinth Rd, Main St.	Peak period trips only
411	Ridge St. Terminal	Glens Falls Walmart	Glen St, Lake George Rd,	
412	Ridge St. Terminal	Aviation Mall / Montcalm Apts.	Glen St, Aviation Rd	No Sunday service
419	Ridge St. Terminal	Beach Rd (Lake George)	Bay St, Quaker Rd, Lake George Rd, Rt. 9, E. Shore Rd.	Weekdays only, service suspended during summer season and replaced with Route 876
713	Ridge St. Terminal	Saratoga Rail Station	I-87, Saratoga Ave., Lake Ave., Church St.	Weekdays only
876	Beach Road Terminal	Lake George RV Park/Ridge St. Terminal	NYS Route 9	Summers Only, Glens Falls Trolley
877	Beach Road Terminal	Bolton Landing	Lake Shore Drive	Summers only, Glens Falls Trolley North

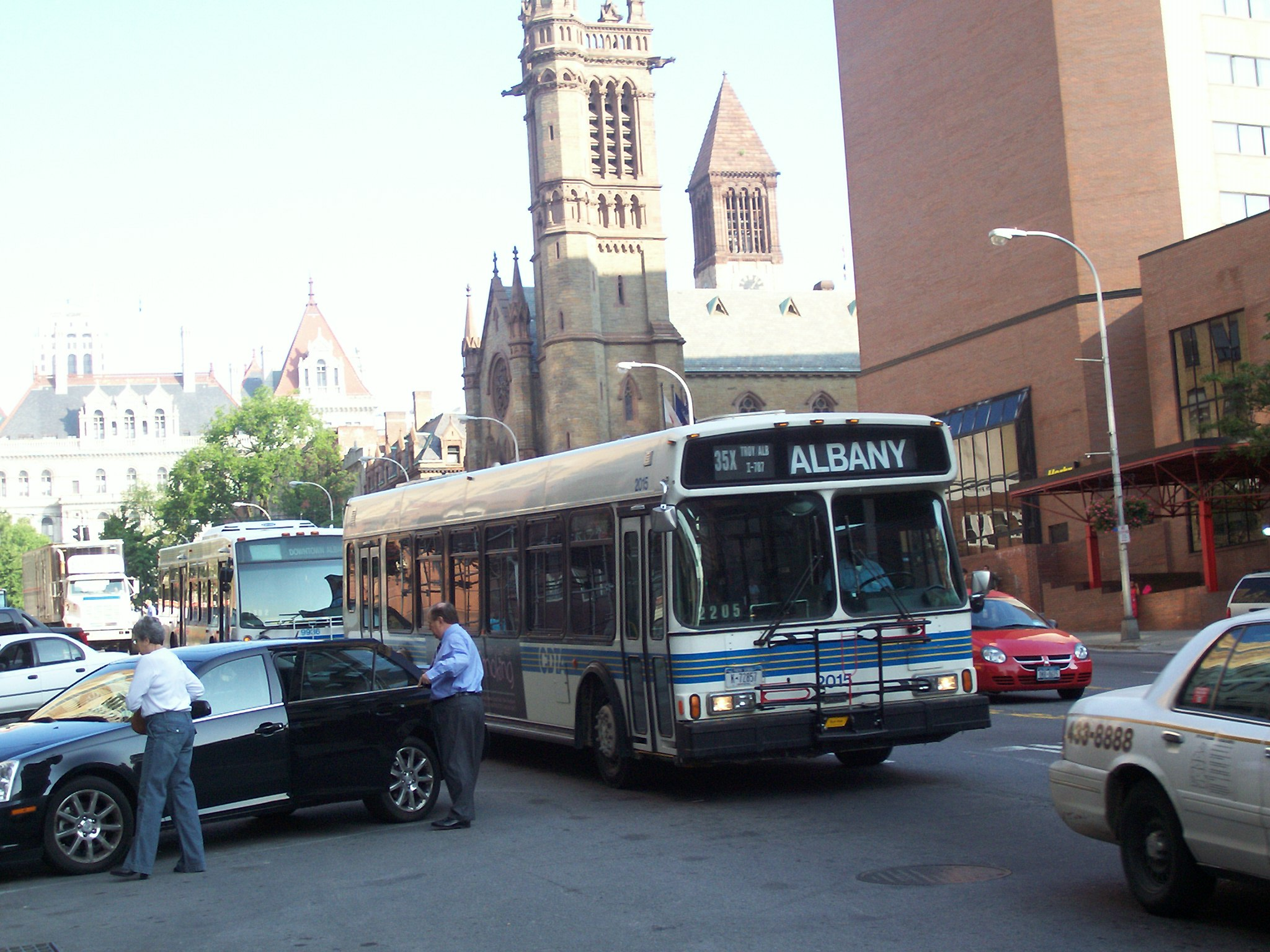
The former 35x bus route at State and Lodge Streets in Albany, July 2006

Former routes that were part of the Glens Falls Division include:

- #405 - Moreau/South Glens Falls (discontinued in August 2026)

== Other services ==
=== Shuttles ===
CDTA formerly operated three suburban shuttles using smaller vans out of Albany Division. These served office parks and destinations not requiring full-size buses. In November 2012, all shuttle service was discontinued and replaced with fixed routes 117 and 155, which now connect Albany International Airport, Wolf Road, Colonie Center, Crossgates Mall, and Washington Ave Ext. This is similar to FLEX Service. [citation needed]

=== Flex service ===
In 2020, CDTA began a service called Flex which is an on-demand service where a person is transported by van to their desired location or CDTA bus route. Riders use an app similar to Uber and Lyft to request a ride. Currently the service operates in Guilderland, starting in September 2021, the southern part of Saratoga County, New York, to service Clifton Park, Halfmoon and Mechanicville, and starting in November 2025, Saratoga Springs, replacing Routes 451 and 452. The program may be expanded in the future to Amsterdam, Glens Falls, and Bethlehem as stated in the 2025 Transit Development Plan. At first the service was free, but in October 2020, CDTA started requiring riders to pay for a Flex ride.

=== BusPlus ===
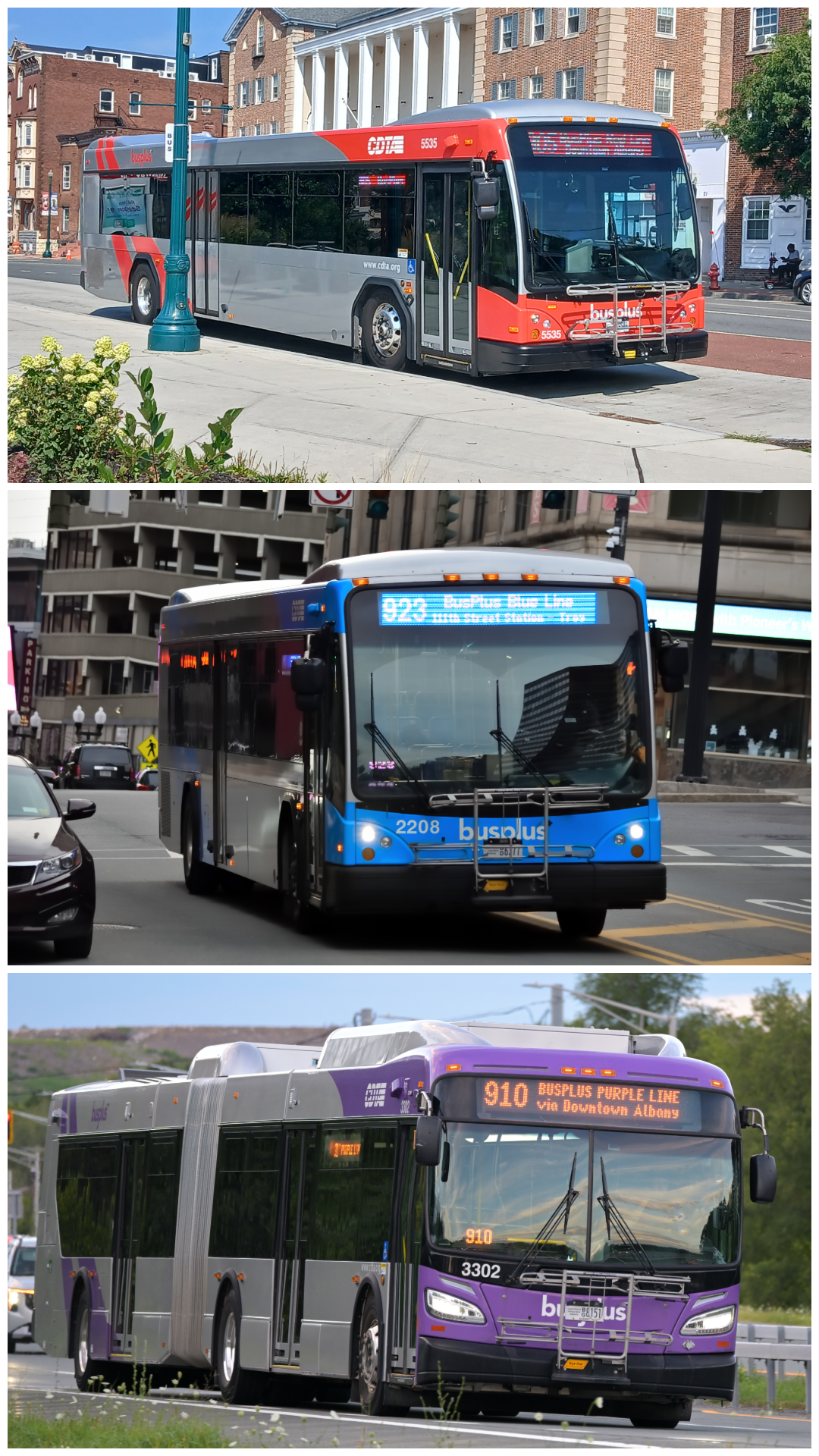
Each of the BusPlus corridors uses buses in a specific color.

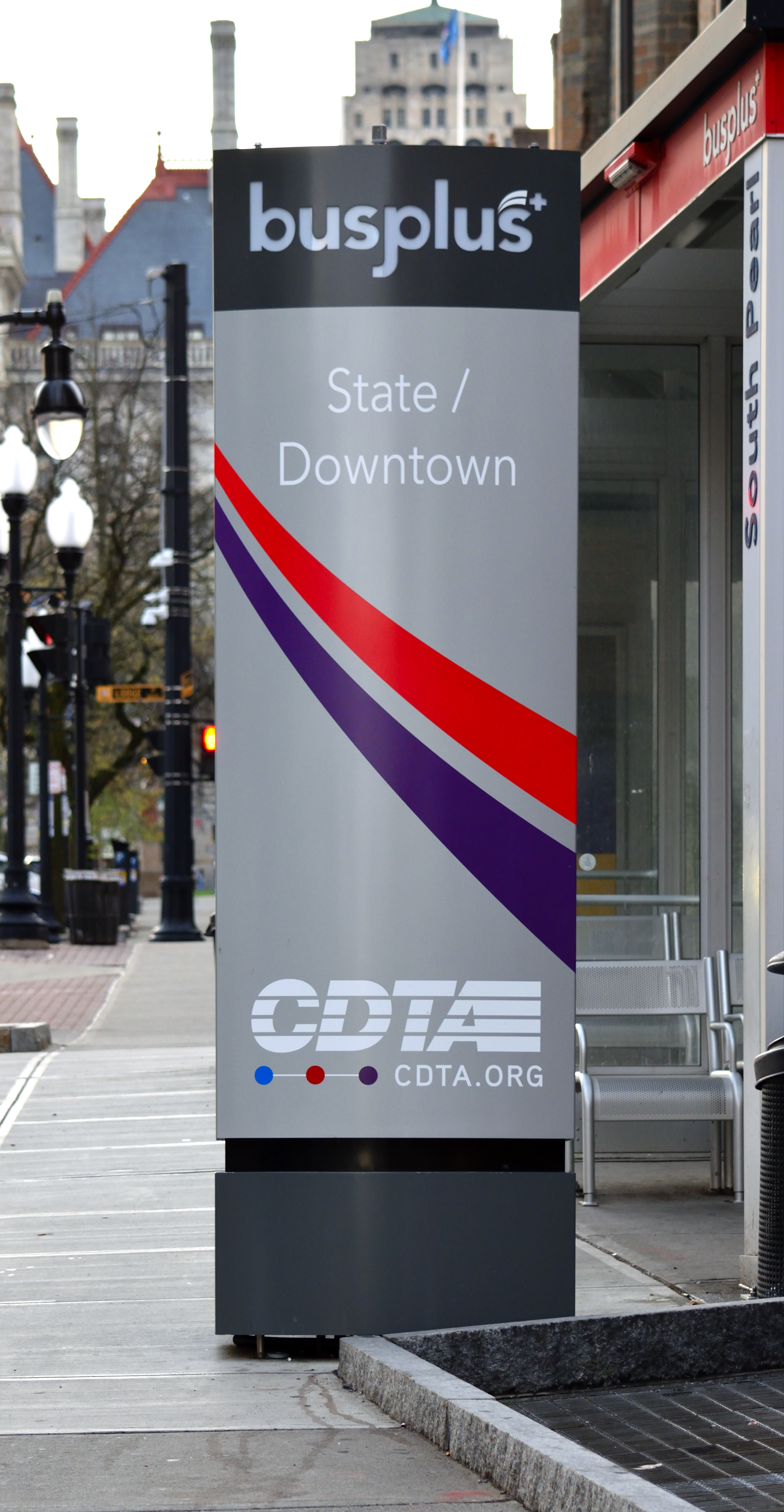
A combined BusPlus Red and Purple line sign

CDTA's BusPlus service is a limited-stop system with distinct line colors, shown to the right. The 4 lines collectively feature frequent arrivals of every 10 to 15 mins. (frequency was decreased on the Red and Blue lines to every 12 to 20 mins in 2025 and 2026 due to a funding deficit, and the Purple Line's frequency is decreased seasonally.) articulated buses, queue jumps and signal priority, although isn't classified as "Full" BRT, since most corridors lack dedicated bus lanes, off-board fare collection, or level boarding.

NY 5 BRT service, known as the Red Line or 905 BusPlus, began on Monday, April 4, 2011, with new silver and red-branded Gillig 40-foot hybrid buses. Route 55 was then renumbered to 355 and cut back to Colonie Station. In 2018 and 2022, the BusPlus fleet was expanded to include New Flyer XD60 articulated buses. In 2024 and 2025, the original Hybrid buses were replaced with Diesel buses.

In November 2020, the BusPlus Service was expanded from one to three routes. The two new routes that operate along the NY 32/Broadway corridor between Downtown Albany, Menands, and Troy/Cohoes are the 922 & 923 (The 922 runs to Cohoes and Delaware Ave Station, the 923 to Waterford and Albany County Rail Trail), also known as the "Blue Line", with 32 stops between Downtown Albany, Cohoes, and Waterford. A fleet of Gillig 40' Diesel buses branded silver and Blue are used on the line/s, with 1 articulated bus joining the fleet in 2023. [citation needed]

On November 5, 2023, Route 910, the "Purple Line" began service operating along Western Ave/US 20 between Downtown Albany and Crossgates Mall, via UAlbany. A fleet of all New Flyer XD60 buses are used. Notably, the Purple Line features a mile long busway through the UAlbany Uptown Campus. On November 30, 2025, 2 previously cut stations were re-added at Western & Colonial and Harriman East.

=== Saratoga Trolley ===
In cooperation with the Saratoga Chamber of Commerce, CDTA operates open-air trolleys during the summer months. In the past, the trolleys would run from Memorial Day weekend to Labor Day to serve popular destinations such as the Saratoga Performing Arts Center, Saratoga Spa State Park, the Saratoga Casino and Raceway, the Saratoga Race Course and Broadway.

Prior to 2011, the trolley ran between Skidmore College and the Saratoga Performing Arts Center. From 2007 to 2010, Route #471 provided summer service to the Saratoga Race Course, before it was discontinued due to low ridership. From 2011 to 2015, the trolley route ran between Broadway, the Saratoga Performing Arts Center, Saratoga Spa State Park, the Saratoga Casino and Raceway and the Saratoga Race Course, to include areas previously served by Route #471. As of 2011, trolley service to Skidmore College was discontinued, with year-round service to Skidmore College continued on former Route #473 and new Route #452. As of 2016, trolley service to Saratoga Spa State Park and the Saratoga Performing Arts Center has been discontinued and replaced by a new route that runs between the Courtyard Hotel, Broadway, the Saratoga Race Course and the Saratoga Casino and Raceway. The 2016 changes also included free fare for all riders and service reduction to instead only run from Independence Day weekend to Labor Day. While not marked as such on the vehicles, this service appears as Route #875 on the Saratoga Service map. [citation needed]

=== Lake George Trolleys ===
Upon taking over Greater Glens Falls Transit in January 2024, CDTA acquired its summer trolley service. Similar to its Saratoga Trolley, the service consists of open-air trolleys that operate during the summer months. The trolleys run from Memorial Day weekend to Columbus Day, with two fixed routes. Route 876 runs along Route 9 between the Ridge St terminal Glens Falls and Beach Rd in Lake George. Additional trips run to Lake George RV Park. During the summer months, Route 419 is temporarily suspended. After Columbus Day, when service along Route 876 is discontinued, Route 419 is continued again. Route 877 runs along Route 9N between Beach Rd in Lake George to the Sagamore in Bolton Landing.

=== STAR Service ===
In 1982, CDTA began providing paratransit services to riders who are medically unable to take regular transit services. ADA wheelchair-accessible buses were added in 1988; since 2004, all CDTA routes have been wheelchair-accessible. The Star fleet has had a variety of minibuses. Though for most of its history it has been dominated by the Orion II low-floor minibus, STAR has begun replacing older models with Startrans "Senator" cutaway vehicles. Other minibuses in the fleet include Ford "ELF" minibuses and several transfers from suburban shuttle routes (see below). [citation needed]

=== NX: Northway Xpress ===
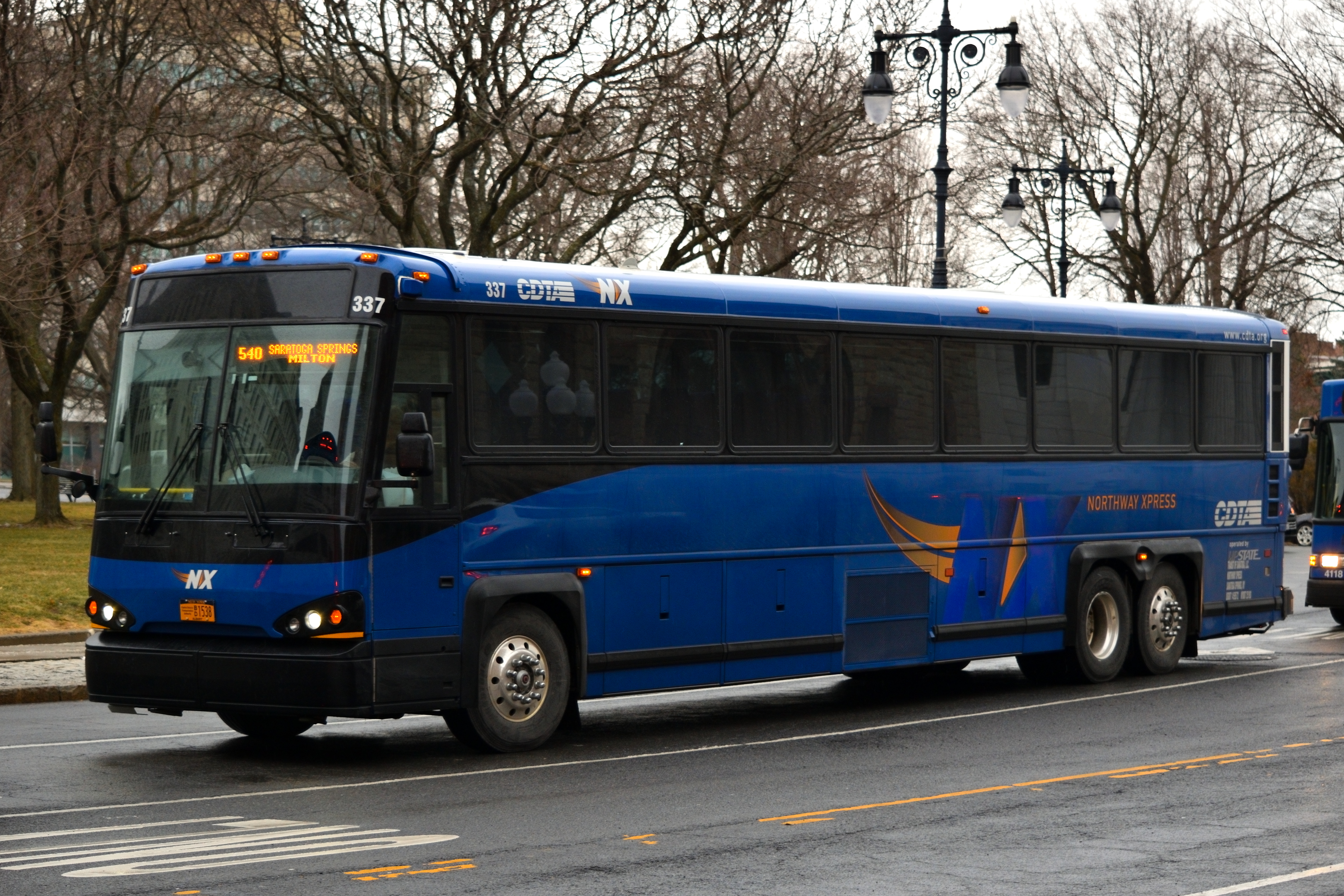
A Northway Xpress bus

The NX: Northway Xpress is a group of express routes that links Albany to towns in Saratoga County which is operated under contract by Upstate Transit (which had been contracted to run the service since 2006). These routes run from Saratoga Springs, Ballston Spa, Malta, Clifton Park, Round Lake, and South Glens Falls to Downtown Albany.

In October 2012, Northway Express fares and schedules were redesigned to increase ridership and service efficiency. Fare structure was consolidated from 5 zones to 3 zones, with the addition of an unlimited ride prepayment card. Service was also eliminated from areas with low ridership, including Mechanicville, Stillwater, Albany International Airport, SUNY Albany, Wolf Road and the Harriman State Office Campus. In May 2014, Northway Express service was expanded to Corporate Woods, but this was later retracted. With the takeover of Greater Glens Falls Transit in January 2024, CDTA is looking to potentially expand its Northway Express service further north into Warren County in the future. [citation needed]

=== TX: Thruway Xpress ===
When CDTA expanded to Montgomery County in August 2022, it began its TX: Thruway Express or #560 service, which operates similar to its Northway Express. The new Thruway Express provides commuter express service between Albany and Amsterdam, also stopping at the Thruway Exit 26 Park & Ride in Glenville along the way. While this service was provided by Brown Coach for many years, and may use some of their coaches, CDTA brought more advertising to the route.

=== Rural service ===
Until 2012, CDTA operated rural/lifeline services to several areas in rural Albany and Rensselaer counties, once per week, including routes #810 (Berne/Knox), #812 (Rensselaerville), #870 (Saratoga County Shuttle), and #96 (Rensselaer Rural, with summer Grafton State Park service); as part of CDTA's route restructuring, these routes were phased out, except Route #96, which now only provides summer Grafton State Park service.

=== Electric scooters ===
The CDTA has been promoting its own electric scooters. Initially planned for use by the public in the summer of 2021, implementation was delayed to 2025.

In 2025, CDTA SCOOT launched, for 1 month from September to October

== Fleet ==
=== Active CDTA fleet ===
All buses are wheelchair accessible.

Year	Manufacturer	Model	Engine	Transmission	Fleet numbers	Notes	Depot Assignments
2014	Gillig	Low Floor 40'	Cummins ISL9	Voith D864.5	4113-4127	4122 has virtual mirrors. 4114-4116, 4119-4121, 4123, 4125-4127 are retired	Albany
2015	Gillig	Low Floor 40'	Cummins ISL9	Voith D864.5	4128-4139	4128, 4137 has plastic seats, later used on 2025 buses	4128, 4129 Albany; 4130-4139 Schenectady
2016	Gillig	Low Floor 40'	Cummins ISL9	Voith D864.5	4140-4149		4140-4142, 4144-4149 Schenectady, 4143 Albany
2016	Gillig	BRT 40'	Cummins ISL9	Voith D864.5	5515-5516	Used for the 905 BRT	Schenectady
2017	Gillig	Low Floor 40'	Cummins ISL9	Voith D864.5 and Voith D864.6	4150-4170	4150-4161 have Voith D864.5 and 4162-4170 have Voith D864.6	4150 Schenectady; 4151-4159, 4161-4170 Troy, 4160 Albany
2017	Gillig	BRT 40'	Cummins ISL9	Voith D864.6	5517	Used for the 905 BRT	Schenectady
2018	Gillig	Low Floor 40'	Cummins L9	Voith D864.6	4171-4182	4173 has virtual mirrors	4171-4172, 4175-4182 Troy; 4173-4174 Albany
2019	Gillig	Low Floor 29'	Cummins L9	Allison B300R-6	40-43	Ex-GGFT buses	Glens Falls
2019	Gillig	Low Floor 40'	Cummins L9	Voith D864.6	4183-4194		4183-4186, 4189 Troy; 4187-4188, 4190-4194 Albany
2020	Gillig	Low Floor 40'	Cummins L9	Voith D864.6	4195-4206		Albany
2020	Gillig	BRT 40'	Cummins L9	Voith D864.6	2200-2219	Used for the 922/923 BRT	Troy
2022	Gillig	Low Floor 29'	Cummins L9	Allison B300R-6	44	Ex-GGFT bus	Glens Falls
2022	Gillig	Low Floor 40'	Cummins L9	Allison B400R-6	4207-4242	4214-4223 can run on Amsterdam routes, 4226 is America 250 Wrapped	4208-4213 Glens Falls; 4214-4223 Schenectady; 4207, 4224-4242 Albany
2023	Gillig	Low Floor 29'	Cummins L9	Allison B300R-6	45-46	Ex-GGFT buses	Glens Falls
2024	Gillig	BRT 40'	Cummins L9	Voith D867.8 NXT	5525-5532	Used for the 905 BRT	Schenectady
2024	Gillig	Low Floor 40'	Cummins L9	Voith D867.8 NXT	4243-4252		4243-4250 Albany; 4251, 4252 Schenectady
2025	Gillig	Low Floor 40'	Cummins L9	Voith D867.8 NXT	4253-4267		4253-4257, Albany; 4258-4262 Troy; 4263-4267 Schenectady
2025	Gillig	BRT 40'	Cummins L9	Voith D867.8 NXT	5533-5537	Used on the 905 BRT	Schenectady
2015	New Flyer	XD60	Cummins ISL9	Voith D864.5	6000-6001		Albany
2017	New Flyer	XD60	Cummins ISL9	Voith D864.6	6002-6007		Albany
2018	New Flyer	XD60	Cummins L9	Voith D864.6	5518, 6008	5518 is used for the 905 BRT	5518 Schenectady; 6008 Albany
2019	New Flyer	XE40	Siemens ELFA2	Direct Drive	1900E-1903E	First 100% all-electric buses in Upstate NY.	Albany
2022	New Flyer	XE40 NG	Siemens ELFA3	Direct Drive	1904E-1907E		Albany
2022	New Flyer	XD60	Cummins L9	Allison B500R-6	5519-5522, 6009-6024	5519-5522, 6020 is used for the 905 BRT, 6019 is used for the 910 BRT.	5519-5522, 6020-22 Schenectady; 6009-6019 Albany; 6023-6024 Troy
2023	New Flyer	XD60	Cummins L9	Allison B500R-6	2220, 3300-3315	2220 is used for the 922/923 BRT, 3300-3315 are used for the 910 BRT	2220 Troy; 3300-3315 Albany
2024	New Flyer	XD60	Cummins L9	Voith D867.8 NXT	5523-5524	Used for the 905 BRT	Schenectady
2026	New Flyer	XE40 NG	Siemens ELFA3	Direct Drive	1908E-1916E		Albany
2015	MCI	D4500CT	Cummins ISL9	Allison B500R-6	329-330*	Used for the 560	Amsterdam
2017	MCI	D4500CT	Cummins ISX12	Allison B500R-6	331-333*	331 is used for the 540, 332-333 are used for the 560	Saratoga, Amsterdam
2019	MCI	D4500CT	Cummins ISX12	Allison B500R-6	334-335*	Used for the 540	Saratoga
2020	MCI	D4500CT	Cummins X12	Allison B500R-6	336-337*	Used for the 540	Saratoga
2022	MCI	D4500CT	Cummins X12	Allison B500R-6	338-339*	338 is used for the 540, 339 is used for the 560	Saratoga, Amsterdam
2024	MCI	D45 CRT	Cummins X12	Allison B500R-6	340-341*	Used on the 540	Saratoga

* All MCIs can run on 560 due to occasional staffing shortages or maintenance changes.

== Future fleet ==
CDTA has purchased 14 40' Gillig Diesel Buses (4268–4281), with delivery in late 2026/early 2027.

CDTA has also purchased 10 New Flyer XDE40s, with delivery in 2027 as per the preference outlined in the 2025 Transit Development Plan for Hybrid Electric Buses, as a "proven bridge technology."They have also ordered one XE60 with delivery in 2028.

CDTA was awarded $31.787 million in 2025 under the Federal Transit Administration's Low or No Emissions grant program and a separate $17.5 million grant, partially to purchase 2 Hydrogen/Fuel Cell Electric Buses.

== Retired fleet ==
Year	Manufacturer	Model	Fleet numbers	Notes	Depot Assignments when delivered	Depot Assignments before buses retired	Retired year
1957	GMC	TDH-4512	100-101	Ex-STS buses	Schenectady		1975
1965	GMC	TDH-5304	113-117	Ex-STS buses	Schenectady		1975
1960	GMC	TDH-4517	150-152	Ex-STS buses	Schenectady		1975
1963	GMC	TDH-4519	301-310	Ex-United Traction buses	Troy		1976
1964	GMC	TDH-4519	311-320	Ex-United Traction buses	Troy		1976
1961	GMC	TDH-4517	333-335	Ex-United Traction buses	Albany		1975
1962	GMC	TDH-4517	336-345	Ex-United Traction buses	Albany		1976
1976	GMC	S8H-5304A Suburban	600-604	Used for the 35X, sometimes used for other routes	Troy		1988
1971	Flxible	111CD-D5-1	200-230		Schenectady		1984
1970	Flxible	111CD-D5-1	400-499		400-449 Albany; 450-499 Troy		Between 1984 and 1986
1975	AMG	9635A-6 35'	500-519		Schenectady		1986
1976	AMG	9640A-6 40'	520-552		520-539 Troy; 540-552 Albany		1986
1983	Crown Ikarus	286 60'	800-807	First 60' buses	Albany		1999
1984	Orion	01.508 40'	630-657, 660–671		Albany		Between 1997 and 1999
1984	Orion	01.502 31'	180-192		Troy		1999
1984	Orion	01.507 36'	700-776		700-730 Schenectady; 731-776 Troy		Between 1997 and 1999
1984-85	Orion	01.509 Suburban 40'	680-689	Used for the 19,21/21X,32,33,33X and sometimes used for other routes	Albany		1999
1985	Orion	01.508 40'	610-619		Albany		1999
1985	Orion	01.507 36'	780-787		Albany		1999
1986	Orion	01.502 31'	193-199		Troy		1999
1986	Orion	01.508 40'	620-629		Albany		1999
1986	Orion	01.507 36'	788-795		Albany		1999
1988	Orion	01.507 36'	250-261		Schenectady	Albany	2004
1988	Orion	01.508 40'	350-353	Used for the 55 from 1988 to 2000	Schenectady	Albany	2004
1988-89	Orion	01.509 Suburban 40'	690-699	690-694 Used for the 35X and for other routes, 695-699 Used for the 55X/57X and for other routes	690-694 Troy; 695-699 Schenectady		2004
1991	Orion	01.509 Suburban 40'	360-369	Used for the 55 from 1991 to 2000, Used for Express routes in Albany from 2000 to 2004	Schenectady	Albany	2004
1991	Orion	V 05.501 40'	1001-1002		Troy		2004
1996-1997	Orion	VI 06.501 40'	2000-2020	0	Albany	2000-2009, 2020 Albany; 2010-2019 Troy	2010
1998	Orion	VI 06.501 40'	2021-2102		2021-2039, 2060–2074, 2100–2102 Albany; 2040–2059, 2090-2099 Schenectady; 2075-2089 Troy	2040-2047, 2049, 2051–2054, 2056 Schenectady; 2058, 2060, 2064, 2066, 2069, 2071–2072, 2074, 2077, 2080, 2082, 2084, 2086–2087, 2102 Albany; 2089-2098 Troy	2008 and between 2010 and 2013
1999	NovaBus	LFS	3021-3030, 9901–9949		3021-3030 Schenectady; 9901-9930 Albany; 9931-9949 Troy	3021, 3023–3024, 3026-3029 Schenectady; 9907, 9910, 9913, 9917 Albany	Between 2014-2015 and 2017–2019
1999	NovaBus	LFS Suburban	3001-3011, 9950–9959	3001-3011 Used for the 55 from 2000 to 2008	3001-3011 Schenectady; 9950-9959 Albany	3001-3002, 3006–3009, 3011, 9950-9959 Albany	2015 and between 2017 and 2018
1999	NABI	35-LFW	9960-9984		9960-9975 Troy; 9976-9984 Albany	Albany	Between 2014 and 2015
2007	Gillig	BRT HEV Suburban 40'	325H	Used for the 540/NX from 2007 to 2013, Used for the 450 and 530 from 2020 to 2023	Saratoga	Schenectady	2023
2007	Gillig	Low Floor 29'	3100-3107		Schenectady	3101, 3103 Schenectady; 3105, 3107 Albany	Between 2019 and 2020
2007	Gillig	Low Floor 40'	4000-4007		Albany	4000-4002, 4007 Troy	2019 and 2022
2007	Gillig	BRT HEV 40'	4008H-4013H	Used for the 55, 4008H used for the 905 BRT from 2011 to 2019, 4009H and 4013H used for the 905 BRT from 2020 to 2022	Schenectady	4009H, 4013H Schenectady; 4010H, 4012 Albany	Between 2019 and 2022
2008	Gillig	Low Floor HEV 29'	3108H-3115H		3108H-3111H Schenectady; 3112H-3115H Albany	3112H, 3115H Albany; 3114H Schenectady	Between 2020 and 2021
2008	Gillig	BRT HEV 40'	4014H-4019H	Used for the 55	Schenectady	Albany	2022
2008-2009	Gillig	Low Floor HEV 40'	4020H-4047H	4020H-4027H are 2008 4028-4047H are 2009	Albany	4020H-4027H, 4031H-4047H Albany; 4028H-4030H Schenectady	Between 2022 and 2024
2009	Gillig	BRT HEV Suburban 40'	326H	Used for the 540/NX from 2007 to 2013, Used for the 450 and 530 from 2020 to 2022	Saratoga	Schenectady	2022
2010	Gillig	Low Floor HEV 40'	4048H-4055H		Troy	4048H-4051H, 4054H-4055H Albany; 4052H-4053H Schenectady	Between 2022 and 2024
2010	Gillig	BRT HEV 40'	5500H-5514H, 5530H-5532H [citation needed]	Used for the 905 BRT	Schenectady		5530H-5532H Retired in 2016-2017 5507H in 2023, 5500H-5506H, 5508H-5514H retired between 2023 and 2025
2010	Gillig	Low Floor 40'	4056-4072		4056-4061 Troy; 4062-4072 Albany	Troy	2024
2012	Gillig	Low Floor 40'	4073-4092		Albany	4073-4078, 4092 Troy; 4079-4091 Schenectady	2025
2013	Gillig	Low Floor 40'	4093-4108		Albany	4093-4096 Troy; 4097-4108 Albany	2025
2013	Gillig	Low Floor HEV 40'	4109H-4112H		Albany		2025
1993	MCI	102-AW3	308-312	Used for the 540/NX	Saratoga		Between 2007 and 2013
1999	MCI	102-D3	313-315	Used for the 540/NX	Saratoga		Between 2016 and 2017
2002	MCI	D4000	316-319	Used for the 540/NX	Saratoga		2019
2006	MCI	D4500CL	320-324	Used for the 540/NX	Saratoga		Between 2020 and 2021
2013	MCI	D4500CT	327-328	Used for the 540/NX from 2013 to 2022, used for the 560/TX from 2022 to 2024	Saratoga	Amsterdam	2024

== Transit development plans ==
In 2005, CDTA commissioned a transit development plan that would create a planned environment to react to needed changes in the CDTA organization.

Parts of this plan included:

- Replacing similar numbers of transit vehicles each year over an expected twelve-year life span, creating a more uniform expectation of vehicles needing replacement, also replacing few and larger orders. This began in 2007, reduced the costs of maintaining an aging fleet.
- Replacing Orion VI buses by 2012 and the NABI and NovaBus LFS buses by 2016.
- Installing LED destination signs on all vehicles, replacing expensive curtain style signage.
- Expansion of service in Saratoga Springs, which took place in July 2007 and modified in May 2016. In addition a further expansion was planned, including erecting and opening of a bus garage in Saratoga Springs for Saratoga County vehicles.
- Redrawing bus routes in hopes to better serve riders, starting with Schenectady-based routes in the second half of 2007.
- Implementation of a three-digit route system, in which the first digit will serve as an indication of the route's primary base. As part of the new three-digit system, 100 routes represent Albany Division, 200 routes represent Troy Division, 300 routes represent Schenectady Division, 400 routes represent Saratoga and Glens Falls service, 500 routes represent express route service, 600 routes represent Amsterdam service, 700 routes represent commuter service, 800 routes represent School routes and shopping shuttles and 900 routes represent Bus Rapid Transit service.
- Expansion of service into Montgomery County to service the City of Amsterdam, which took place on August 28, 2022.
- Connecting Warren & Washington Counties to the rest of its route system by a regular fixed route between Glens Falls and Saratoga Springs (which took place with the creation of new route #713 on August 24, 2025) and extension of its Northway Express Service

In 2025, CDTA developed another Transit Development Plan, which (most importantly) mentions:

- Service/route cuts due to a budget deficit
- Route splitting to better allocate resources
- potential fare increases
- more articulated buses to increase capacity without increasing service.

These service changes started in August 2025 and continued into 2026.

== See also ==
- Albany Convention Center Authority
- Albany Port District Commission
- Nelson A. Rockefeller Empire State Plaza Performing Arts Center Corporation
- Capital District
- New York State Archives
- Central New York Regional Transportation Authority – Syracuse, New York
- Metropolitan Transportation Authority – New York Metropolitan Area
- Niagara Frontier Transportation Authority – Buffalo, New York
- Rochester-Genesee Regional Transportation Authority – Rochester, New York
