= MJ Designs =

Arts and crafts retailer

- Company type: Defunct as of 2003
- Industry: Retail
- Founded: 1986
- Founder: Michael Dupey (chairman)
- Headquarters: Coppell, Texas
- Products: Retail arts & crafts, scrapbooking, home decor, custom framing
- Revenue: N/A
- Number of employees: N/A

MJ Designs was an arts and craft retail store in the Dallas/Fort Worth and Washington, D.C., areas. The company filed for Chapter 11 bankruptcy on December 13, 2002, and went out of business in May 2003.

== Products ==
MJ Designs sold a variety of arts and crafts products, floral products and arrangements, and supplies for scrapbooking, custom framing, pottery, and hobbies.

== History ==
Michael Dupey got his start in 1968 when he worked for City Product Corporation (Ben Franklin Stores). He converted one of these stores into an arts and crafts outlet after his father, James Dupey, purchased it for $72,000 from City Product Corporation. The buyout stated that Michael Dupey had to pay his father back $1.2 million after taxes, with the balance due after eight years. In that period, he changed the name to Michaels Arts & Crafts and paid back his father's loan.

In 1983 his father sold out the contracts to Sam Wyly. James Dupey sold his son's contracts for the stores that were not paid for 100%, along with Michael's cash deposits and his name (Michaels Arts & Crafts). James Dupey told Michael that the store name was registered under Dupey Management Corporation (Michael Dupey's Corporation); however, it was not; James Dupey had registered it to his corporation, Dupey Enterprises, Inc.

Michael worked with the new owner, Sam Wyly. He gave Michael the two Michaels Arts & Craft stores in the Dallas/Fort Worth area in return, to help Michael build a public company.

Sam operated Michaels from 1983 until 1990 when it became financially difficult. Michael Dupey, who at the time was operating his 24-unit MJ Designs chain, was brought in as a special consultant. The public company was moving forward on all fronts with positive momentum. The Michaels chain comprised 140 stores by the end of 1990, with sales reaching $362 million, and debt down from $34 million to $9 million after one year. Michael worked as a consultant for Michaels public company until 1999.

MJ Designs was formerly a part of Michaels, operating as Michael's MJ Designs, before the company split in the mid-1980s. Major disagreements between the father and son caused the company to split. As part of the court ruling, Mike got stores in the DFW area and East Coast to rename MJ Designs. James Dupey held the Austin and Houston areas. The court ruling stated that Michaels and MJ Designs must avoid each other's territory for seven years so both companies could grow without competition.

In 1997, the court ruling expired. MJ Designs filed for Chapter 11 bankruptcy in 1999, despite reporting sales of $247.2 million that year.

By 2001, the chain still had more than 500 stores across the country. Its eight Maryland stores were sold, mainly to Michaels. They closed all their stores in the Northeast region and several in the Dallas/Fort Worth area around this time. The remaining nine stores were bought out by Cardnell Investors, who reopened the Dallas/Fort Worth stores. MJ Designs filed for Chapter 11 bankruptcy again on 13 December 2002, and closed its doors in May 2003.
