= New York State Route 155 =

State highway in Albany County, New York, US

New York State Route 155
- NY 155 highlighted in red

Route information
- Maintained by NYSDOT, Albany County and the city of Watervliet
- Length: 16.85 mi (27.12 km)
- Existed: c. 1931–present

Major junctions
- West end: NY 85A in Voorheesville
- US 20 in Westmere; NY 5 in Colonie; Albany International Airport in Colonie; I-87 in Colonie; US 9 in Colonie
- East end: NY 32 in Watervliet

Location
- Country: United States
- State: New York
- Counties: Albany

Highway system
- New York Highways; Interstate; US; State; Reference; Parkways
← NY 154	→ NY 156

New York State Route 155 (NY 155) is a 16.85-mile-long (27.12 km) state highway located entirely within Albany County in the Capital District of New York. The western terminus of the route is at NY 85A in Voorheesville. The eastern terminus is at NY 32 in Watervliet. NY 155 mainly serves as a connection to the Albany International Airport from the major roads it connects to.

== Route description ==
NY 155 begins at a roundabout with NY 85A (Maple Road) on the eastern edge of Voorheesville in the town of New Scotland. NY 155 proceeds northeast along State Farm Road, crossing under the former railroad bed of the Albany and Susquehanna Railroad into a junction with County Route 306 (CR 306 or Voorheesville Avenue / Normanskill Road). The two lane road continues on, winding northwest through New Scotland before entering the town of Guilderland. The route passes east of the Albany Country Club before crossing the Normans Kill creek and passing a housing development. Crossing Blockhouse Creek, NY 155 reaches the hamlet of Westmere.

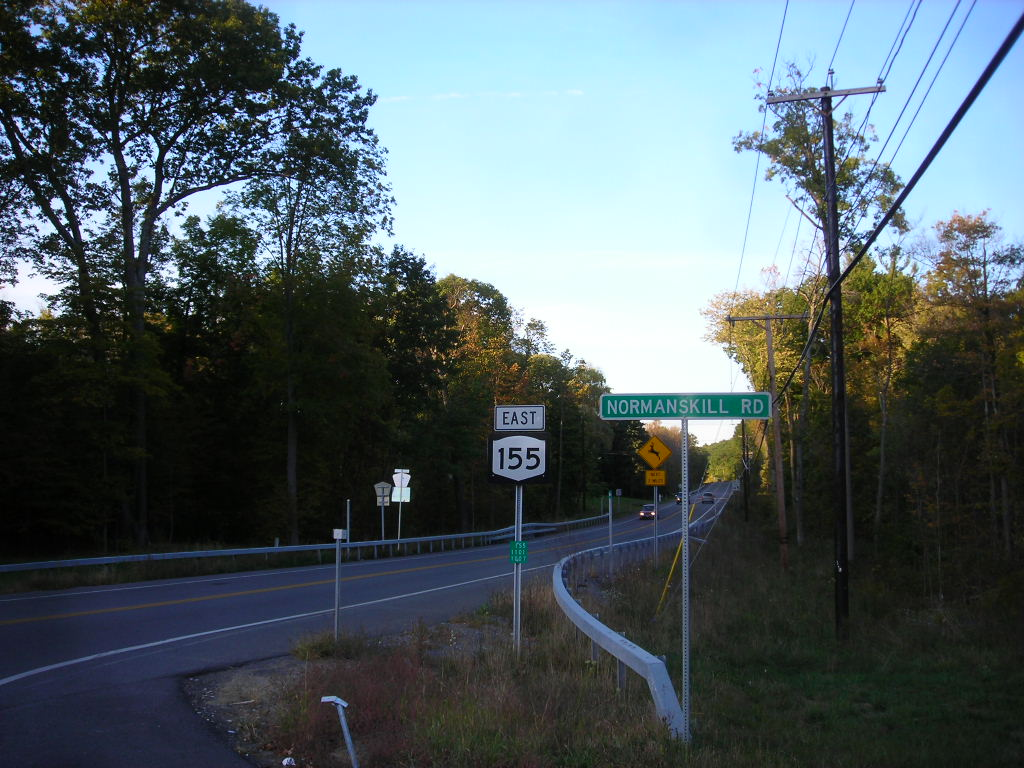
NY 155 north of CR 306 in New Scotland

Through Westmere, NY 155 bends northeast, crossing past the Hiawatha Trails Golf Course and past several housing developments before reaching the center of the hamlet, where it crosses US 20 (Western Avenue). At this junction, maintenance jurisdiction switches from the New York State Department of Transportation to Albany County, and the route becomes concurrent with CR 157. The road name change names from State Farm Road to New Karner Road. Shortly north of US 20, the route crosses into the city of Albany at Corporate Circle. Through Albany, NY 155 and CR 157 remain a two-lane arterial, passing through the Albany Pine Bush Preserve and intersecting with the western terminus of the Washington Avenue Extension (unsigned NY 910D).

Just north of Washington Avenue Extension, NY 155 and CR 157 cross over the New York State Thruway (I-90), and cross through another section of the Albany Pine Bush Preserve. Soon leaving the city of Albany, the routes cross into the town of Colonie after a short stint back in Guilderland. Turning further to the northeast through Colonie, NY 155 and CR 157 pass through the hamlet of Karner and cross over tracks used by Amtrak. After crossing the tracks, the road passes through a corner of the village of Colonie. The routes reach a junction with NY 5 (Central Avenue) and the surrounding commercial area. NY 155 and CR 157 along New Karner Road, a two-lane arterial. At the junction with Watervliet–Shaker Road, NY 155 and CR 157 turn east, while the right-of-way continues north as Vly Road.

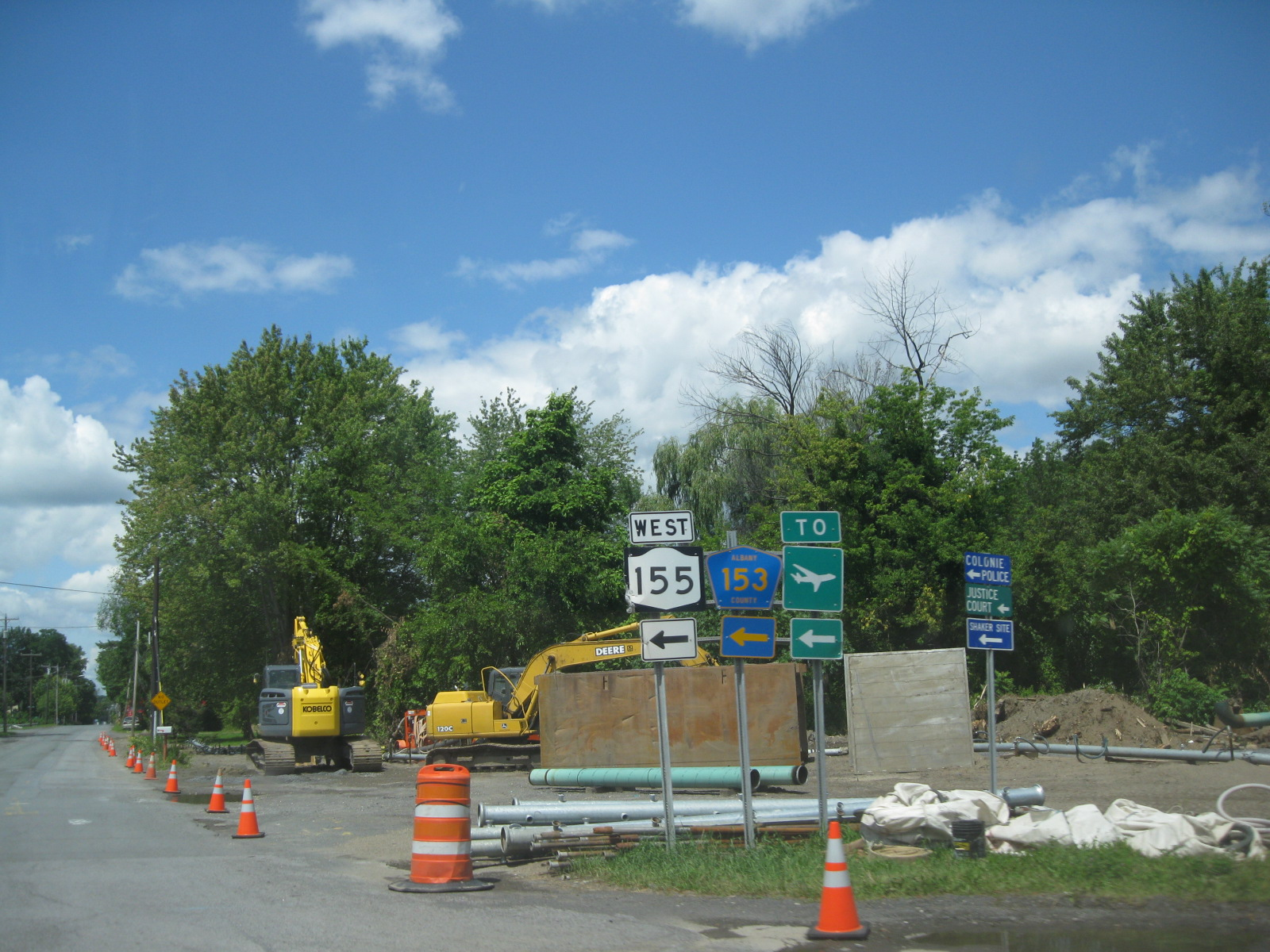
NY 155 west at CR 153 in Colonie

Still in the town of Colonie, NY 155 and CR 157 continue east along Watervliet–Shaker Road, passing the Memory's Garden Cemetery. Passing north of Stump Pond, the routes soon turn northeast through the hamlet of Shakers, where widens into a four lane divided highway. County Route 157 ends at a junction with CR 151 (Albany Shaker Road). NY 155 and CR 151 become concurrent, running along the divided four-lane Albany Shaker Road, which provides the main access to Albany International Airport. Passing the main terminal of the airport, the routes bends southward at the entrance gate. Soon after passing the terminal, the median ends but the road remains four lanes as it passes the south end of the main runway. The next major junction is at the intersection of CR 153 (Wolf Road) and the southbound onramp of I-87 exit 4.

NY 155 and CR 153 continue northeast along Wolf Road, parallel to Interstate 87 (the Adirondack Northway). CR 153 terminates at a nearby roundabout, where NY 155 turns east. Albany County's jurisdiction also ends at the roundabout. This is the eastern section of Watervliet–Shaker Road, which was severed by the runway. NY 155 continues east, crossing under I-87 at exit 5. Continuing east through the town of Colonie, the route soon reaches a junction with US 9 (Loudon Road) just south of the Latham Circle. NY 155 continues southeast through Colonie as a two-lane residential street, winding southeast past Immaculate Conception Cemetery. Passing a small pond, the route remains residential, soon crossing over railroad tracks into the city of Watervliet.

In Watervliet, NY 155 proceeds northeastward as Tenth Street, a main commercial street through the city. At the junction with Third Avenue, it turns north for one block, turning eastward on 13th Street for one more block, reaching a junction with NY 32 (Second Avenue). This junction marks the eastern terminus of NY 155, which continues east as part of NY 32.

== History ==
NY 155 was assigned c. 1931 to the portion of its alignment between NY 5 in Colonie and NY 32 in Watervliet. Meanwhile, the segment of what is now NY 155 from NY 85A near Voorheesville to U.S. Route 20 in Guilderland was designated as NY 310 at some point between 1931 and 1936. NY 155 was extended southwest along Karner Road to US 20 c. 1965 and to NY 85A near Voorheesville by 1968, supplanting NY 310.

The routing of NY 155 around the Albany International Airport has been changed several times over the years as the airport has expanded, extended runways, and improved terminal and parking access. The most recent realignment occurred in 2003 as the alignment of both Watervliet Shaker Road and Albany Shaker Road were reconfigured within the vicinity of the airport.

== Major intersections ==
The entire route is in Albany County.

Location	mi	km	Destinations	Notes
New Scotland	0.00	0.00	NY 85A – New Scotland, Voorheesville	Western terminus; roundabout
Guilderland	3.91	6.29	US 20 – Duanesburg, Albany	Western terminus of CR 157 and county maintenance; hamlet of Westmere
Albany	5.30	8.53	Washington Avenue Extension (NY 910D) – Hospital, Excelsior College	Western terminus of unsigned NY 910D; to New York State Thruway
Village of Colonie	7.04	11.33	NY 5 (Central Avenue) – Schenectady, Albany	
Town of Colonie	9.02	14.52	CR 157 north (Airport Access Road) / CR 151 west (Albany Shaker Road) to NY 7	Eastern terminus of CR 157 concurrency; western terminus of CR 151 concurrency
Town of Colonie	9.05	14.56	Albany International Airport	
Town of Colonie	11.22	18.06	I-87 south (Adirondack Northway) to I-90 / New York Thruway	Exit 3 on I-87 (Adirondack Northway)
Town of Colonie	11.25	18.11	CR 153 north (Wolf Road) / CR 151 east (Albany Shaker Road) to I-87 north	Eastern terminus of CR 151 concurrency; western terminus of CR 153; to Wolf Road (NY 910B)
Town of Colonie	12.35	19.88	Watervliet Shaker Road / Old Niskayuna Road	Roundabout; eastern terminus of CR 153
Town of Colonie	12.55	20.20	I-87 (Adirondack Northway)	Exit 5 on I-87 (Adirondack Northway); partial cloverleaf interchange; northern terminus of county maintenance
Town of Colonie	13.47	21.68	US 9 – Siena College	Hamlet of Latham
Watervliet	16.85	27.12	NY 32 (Second Avenue / 13th Street)	Eastern terminus
1.000 mi = 1.609 km; 1.000 km = 0.621 mi: Concurrency terminus

== See also ==
- List of county routes in Albany County, New York
