= Crossgates Mall =

Shopping mall in Guilderland, New York

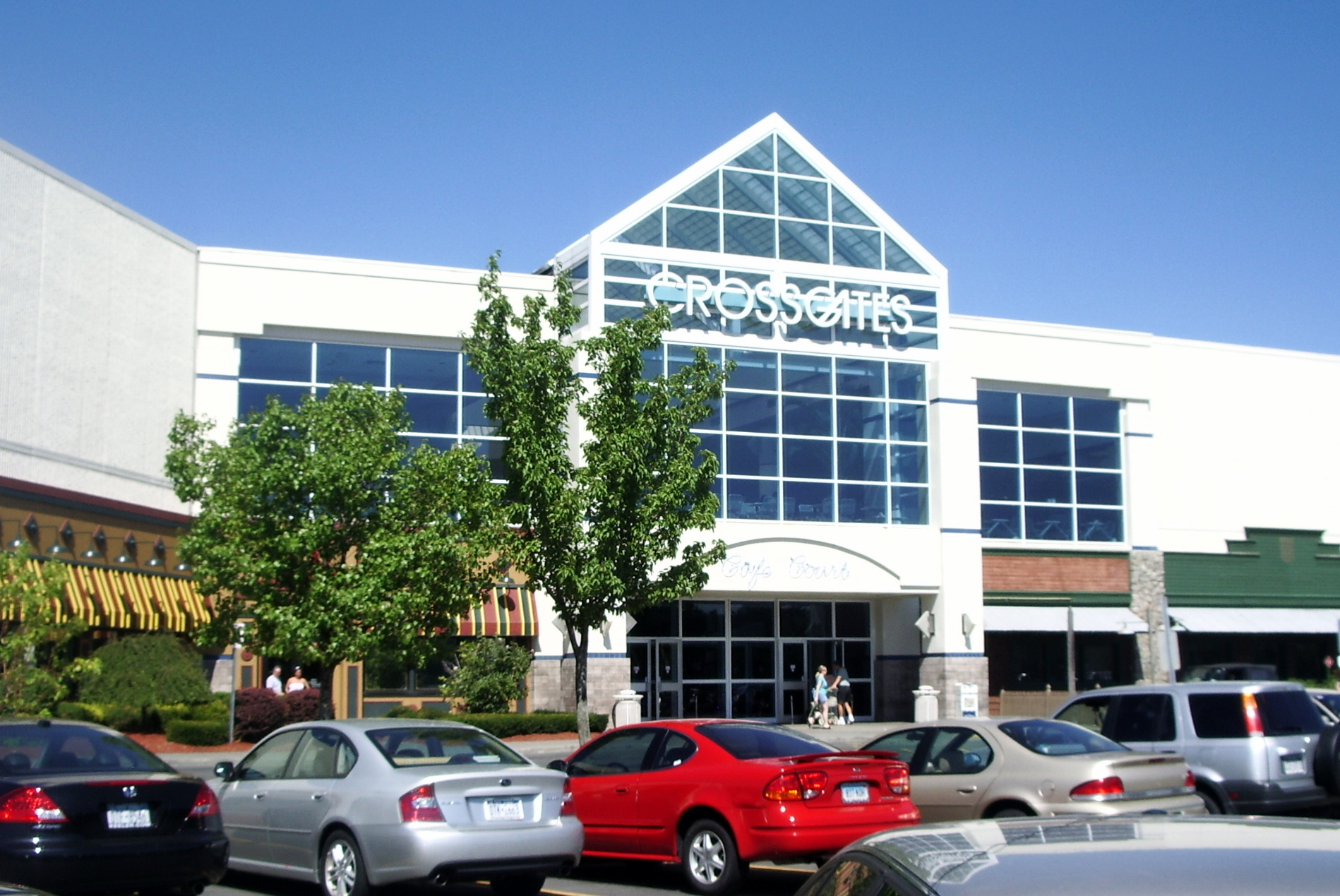
- Location: Guilderland, New York
- Coordinates: 42°41′23″N 73°51′03″W
- Opened: March 4, 1984; 42 years ago
- Developer: The Pyramid Companies
- Manager: The Pyramid Companies
- Owner: Pyramid Management Group
- Num. of stores: 200
- Num. of anchor tenants: 9
- Floor area: 1,700,000 sq ft (160,000 m^{2})
- Floors: 2 plus mezzanine level in center court
- Public transit: CDTA bus: 10, 12, 114, 117, 155, 190, 712, 763
- Website: shopcrossgates.com

Crossgates Mall is an enclosed, super-regional shopping mall located in Guilderland, a suburb of Albany, New York. It is the largest indoor shopping center in the Capital District, and the third largest in the State of New York. The mall is anchored by retailers Macy's, JCPenney, Dick's Sporting Goods, Primark, Burlington, and Best Buy.

Both Crossgates Mall and the nearby Crossgates Commons shopping plaza are owned and operated by the Pyramid Management Group, Inc. through multiple subsidiaries. The mall has a gross leasable area of 1,700,000 sq ft (160,000 m^{2}) and features 212 stores and restaurants as well as an 18-screen IMAX Regal Cinema theater.

Vehicular access is available from Western Avenue, Washington Avenue Extension, and a ramp just south of Adirondack Northway terminus. There are 10-12 parking lots. Public transit is available via a major bus stop served by multiple Capital District Transportation Authority routes.

== History ==
=== Development and opposition ===
In the 1970s, Syracuse-based Pyramid Management Group, Inc. (Pyramid) began purchasing lands within the Pine Bush with the intent to develop a shopping mall, but it wasn't until 1978 that their plans were revealed to the public. The initial proposal called for a $50 million mall on a 175 acres (71 ha) lot with six anchor stores, 100 vendors, a food court, and direct access from the Adirondack Northway.

Opposition from residents and environmentalists was rapid and widespread. The first public hearing on the project was attended by more than 300 speakers, the majority of whom opposed the projects on the grounds that it would destroy a large swath of the unique and ecologically sensitive Pine Bush, would contribute to the continuing urbanization of Guilderland, would cause traffic congestion, and would not provide the claimed economic benefits, among other objections. Despite widespread opposition, a petition from a citizen's group known as the Concerned Citizens Against Crossgates, and an embattled town board, the project was approved rapidly. In opposition, the town supervisor at the time stated: "Taking into consideration that the majority of the correspondence I got was opposed to the Crossgates, and (a) feeling that I have that, in the future that part of town will just be a conglomeration of traffic, I am forced to vote in the negative." The decision was the cause of at least one town official's resignation.

During the four years following the unveiling of the proposal, the town board only voted unanimously on one aspect of the project: that the town should receive its full share of the resulting tax revenue. The Mall proposal was subject to permit approval by the New York State Dept. of Environmental Conservation (ENCON or DEC). In the summer of 1980 DEC conducted an environmental law adjudication in which the Mall opponents and the Pyramid Corporation engaged in adversarial proceedings before an environment law judge. Records of the citizen opposition and record of the hearing are held in the Albany Archives. The citizens won the judgement against the Mall based on extensive testimony and cross-examination. That judgement was then reversed by the DEC Commissioner appointed by Governor Hugh Carey.

=== Early years ===
The mall opened on March 4, 1984. Although Pyramid had initially planned for a 1.3 million square footprint with six anchors, at opening it occupied only 975,000 square feet (90,600 m^{2}) and had four anchors: a Caldor, Jordan Marsh, Filene's, and JCPenney. Of the roughly 170 smaller vendor spaces, 80 were occupied. It was the seventh enclosed shopping mall built by Pyramid, part of a nationwide boom in shopping center openings that peaked at 2,600 in 1985.

Throughout the 1980s, Pyramid sought to expand the mall into the footprint originally envisioned, but were repeatedly rebuffed by the Town.

=== Expansion ===
In October 1994 the mall underwent an expansion nearly doubling its footprint to almost 1,700,000 square feet (160,000 m^{2}) and providing space for up to 250 stores. Following this expansion, Lord & Taylor, Hoyts Cinemas, and a new Filene’s store opened as anchors. The original Filene’s space was partially occupied by a Dick's Sporting Goods. In 1996, anchor Jordan Marsh was replaced by Macy's when the Jordan Marsh brand was retired.

In 1998, Pyramid attempted to double the mall footprint to 3,600,000 square feet (330,000 m^{2}) for a new recreation facility, and sought to raze a nearby residential neighborhood for an 8-story hotel. Following widespread citizen protests, the Guilderland Town Board rejected the required zoning changes.

In 1999, Cohoes Fashions relocated their store from their historic location in downtown Cohoes, New York. In 2007 their parent company, Burlington Coat Factory, closed many of the Cohoes locations and branded those that remained as Burlington Coat Factory. Caldor went out of business the same year. Their space at the mall's center court was split between a Best Buy on the second floor and an H&M on the first. Lord & Taylor would build a store in 2014. In 2021, it was announced the legendary division would shutter and was replaced with Primark.

=== Recent years ===
Pyramid developed several dining and entertainment categories during the mid-2010's. By 2023, following the COVID-19 pandemic, Crossgates Mall had also announced several newest additions.

In August 2017 Pyramid announced a plan to construct a hotel in partnership with Hilton. The hotel opened in 2018, achieving a strategic goal Pyramid had held since at least the late 1990s. It opened under the Homewood Suites, aimed at long-term stays, and the Tru brand, aimed at younger travelers. Both brands are owned by Hilton.

Pyramid announced a plan to develop three sites adjacent to mall in 2018. Initially, this called for 222 residential units and a Costco. The latter was to be developed on a lot that would require demolition of a "ghost neighborhood", consisting of homes Pyramid had purchased in the preceding two decades. Within a month, local environmental watchdog group Save the Pine Bush, residents, and other groups sued Pyramid alleging that clearcutting of the Costco site had occurred in violation of the State Environmental Quality Review Act and the Fourteenth Amendment. The suit was later dismissed.

== Bibliography ==
- Burger, Joanna (2006). Whispers in the Pines: a Naturalist in the Northeast. Piscataway, NJ: Rutgers University Press. ISBN 978-0-8135-3794-8.
