= Dana Park =

Urban park in Albany, New York

Coordinates: 42°39′7.1″N 73°46′4.8″W

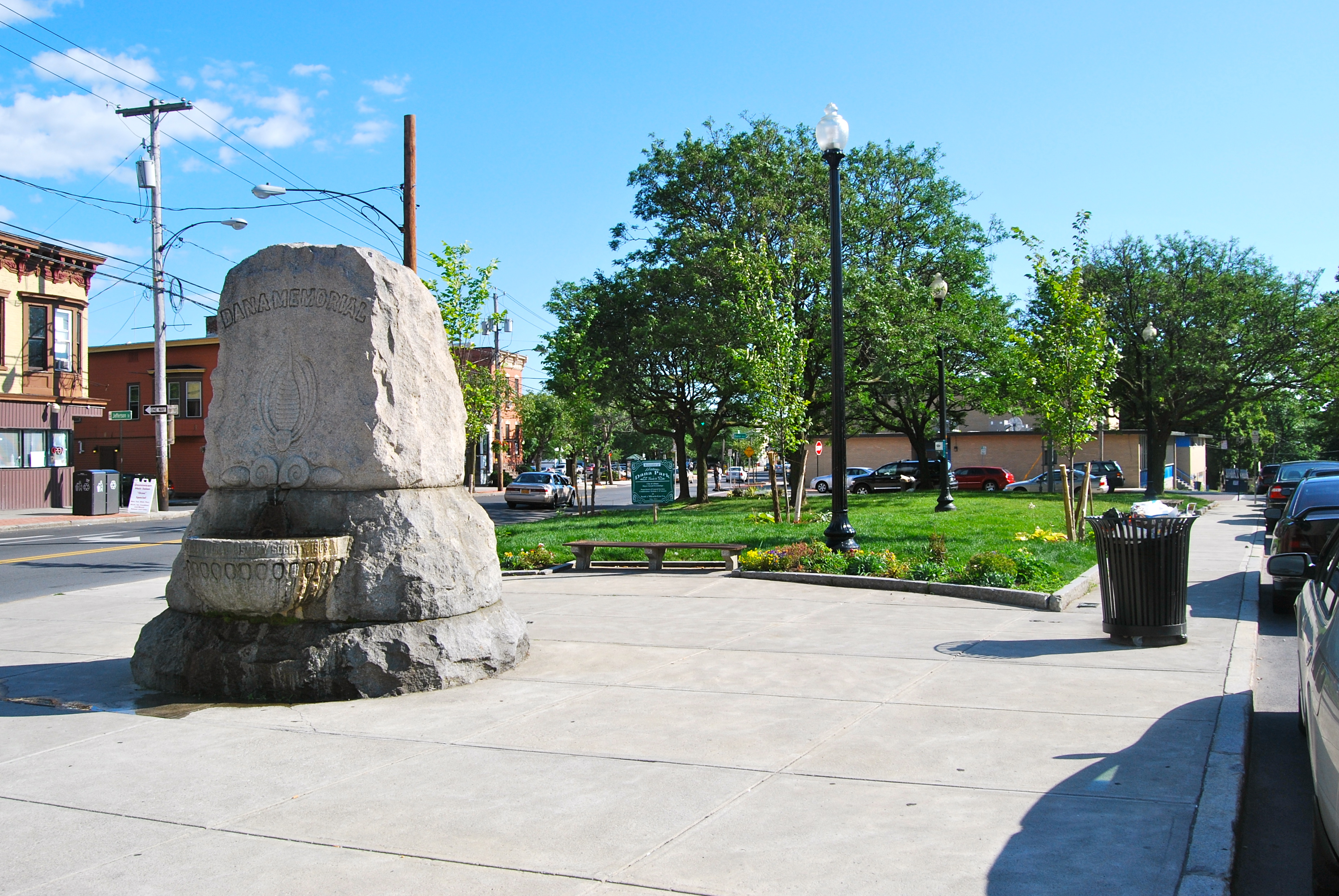
- Dana Park as viewed from Lark Street
- Interactive map of Dana Park
- Type: Urban park
- Location: Albany, New York
- Area: .2 acres (810 m^{2})
- Created: 1826

Dana Park is a small .2-acre (810 m^{2}) urban park in Albany, New York and includes a memorial to James Dana which doubles as Albany's last remaining horse trough. It is located in the Y-intersection caused by Delaware Avenue to the east and Lark Street to the west, with the third leg of the triangle formed by Dana Avenue. Madison Avenue forms a five-point intersection with Lark Street and Delaware Avenue at the eastern end of the park. The park is important to several different neighborhoods, Hudson-Park, Park South, and Lark Street.

== History ==
In December, 1826 the Common Council of Albany decided that at the end of the lease of the current property holder of Delaware Square, the square would become a public square. The park was dedicated on Arbor Day 1901 as Dana Park by Mayor Blessing, in honor of James Dwight Dana, a renowned geologist from Utica. The Dana Natural History Society of Albany, a women only science organization begun in 1868, erected an ornate fountain at the eastern end of the park in 1903. The fountain was a trough to water horses and was used until the late 1940s, the horses pulling the bread wagons of the Freihofer's Baking Company were the last known to use it until the fountain was hooked back to the city water main in 1988 for use by the Albany Police Department's mounted patrol unit.

== Dana Memorial ==
The Dana Memorial is a granite memorial to geologist James Dwight Dana which includes the last remaining horse trough in the city. The memorial is carved with features of trilobites, crinoids, and eurypterid. It was erected in 1903 by the Dana Natural History Society, which today is the oldest female naturalist association in the United States. The fountain is also used to collect water for watering a small garden in the middle of the park.

== Activities ==
A farmer's market is held every Thursday during the summer.

A Little Free Library book box is located within Dana Park, providing the community with a free book-sharing program.

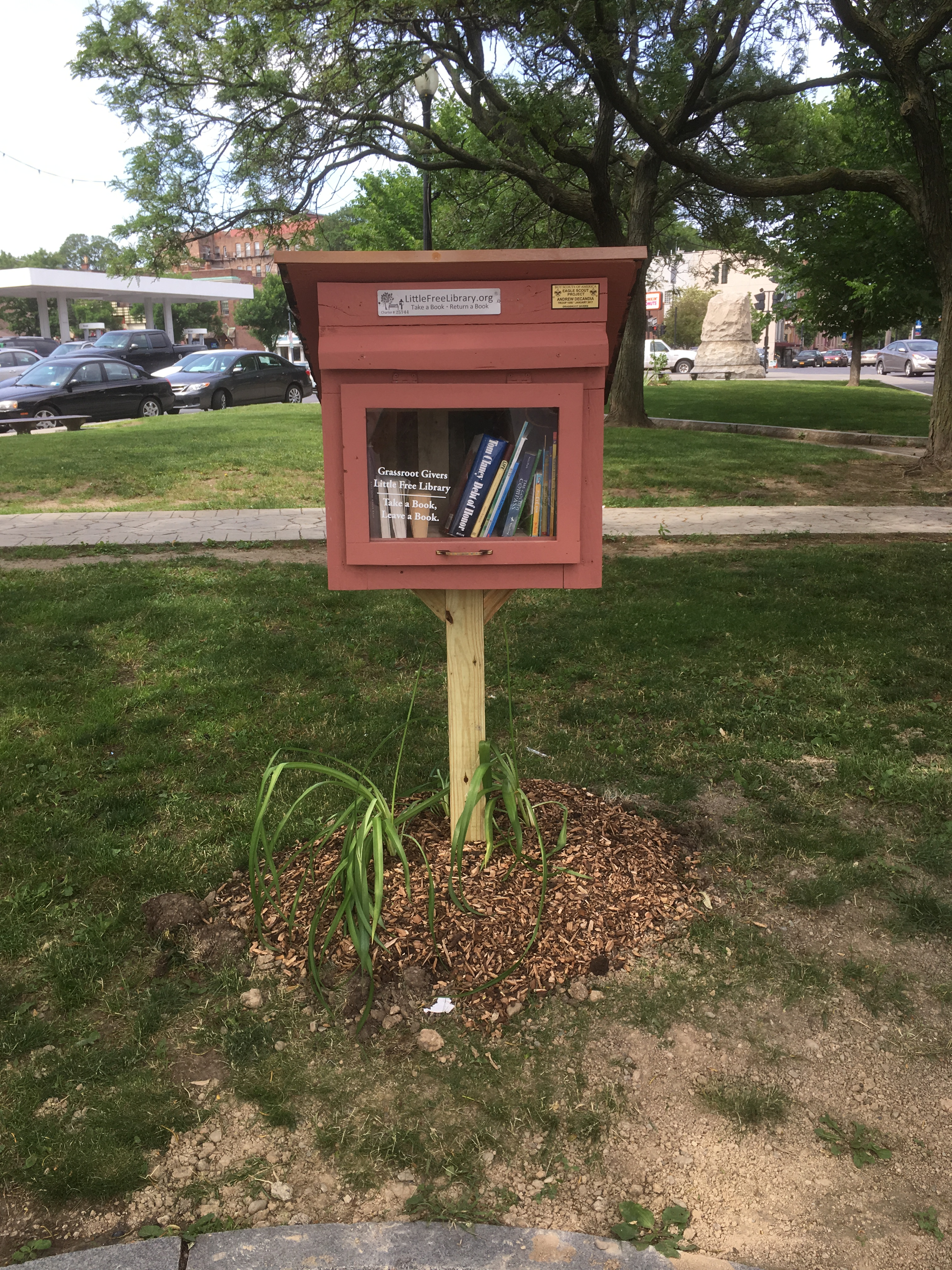
Little Free Library book box located in Dana Park
