= Crank =

Crank may refer to:

== Arts and entertainment ==
=== Music ===
- Crank (Hoodoo Gurus album), 1994
- Crank (The Almighty album), 1994
- "Crank" (Catherine Wheel song), 1993
- "Crank" (Playboi Carti song), 2025
- "Crank" (Slayyyter song), 2025
- "Crank", a song by Fischer-Z from Going Deaf for a Living, 1980
- "Crank", a song by TV Rock from Sunshine City, 2006

=== Other uses in arts and entertainment ===
- Crank (film), a 2006 film starring Jason Statham
  - Crank: High Voltage, the 2009 sequel
- Crank (novel), by Ellen Hopkins, 2004
- Crank! A Record Company, a record label
- Cranks, fictional creatures in The Maze Runner book series

== Places ==
- Crank, Merseyside, England
  - Crank Halt railway station
- Cranks, Kentucky, United States

== Other uses ==
- Crank (mechanism), an arm attached at a right angle to a rotating shaft
- Crank (surname), a surname, including a list of people with the name
- Cranks (restaurant), a chain of English wholefood vegetarian restaurants
- Crank of a partition, in number theory
- Crank, slang term for methamphetamine

== See also ==
- Cranky (disambiguation)
- Krank (disambiguation)
- Crankset, a component of a bicycle drivetrain
- Crankshaft, in a piston engine
- Crank machine, a penal labour device
- Prank call or crank call, a false telephone call
