= Cranky =

Cranky may refer to:

- Irritability
- Cranky Kong, a character from the Donkey Kong video game series
- Cranky the Crane, a character from the children's television series Thomas & Friends
- Cranky Doodle Donkey, a character in the Canadian animated TV series My Little Pony: Friendship is Magic
- Mr. Cranky, a satirical film critic personae since 1995
- Cranky, a character from Where's My Water?

== See also ==
- Crank (disambiguation)
- Kranky (disambiguation)
- Crankie, a form of moving panorama performance operated by a crank
