= Cronk (surname) =

Cronk is a surname.

== List of people with the surname ==
- Chas Cronk, English singer-songwriter and musician
- Cooper Cronk (born 1983), Australian rugby league footballer
- Coy Cronk (born 1998), American football player
- Edwin M. Cronk (1918–2020), the third United States Ambassador to Singapore
- Eleanore A. Cronk, Canadian judge
- George P. Cronk (1904–1996), Los Angeles City Councilman for the 5th district, 1945–52
- Hiram Cronk (1800–1905), the last surviving veteran of the War of 1812 at the time of his death
- Kylie Cronk (born 1984), softball player from Australia, who won a bronze medal at the 2008 Summer Olympics
- Mary Cronk MBE (1932–2018), an independent midwife from England awarded an MBE for services to midwifery
- Mike Cronk, American politician
- Rick Cronk (born 1942), American businessman, co-owner and president of Dreyer's Grand Ice Cream
- Toni Cronk (born 1980), field hockey goalkeeper from Australia

== See also ==
- Crank (surname)
