= Kranky =

Kranky may refer to:

- Kranky (director) (born 1976, a.k.a. Laurence Shanet), director of commercials and films, writer, producer
- Kranky (record label), an independent record label based in Chicago

== See also ==
- Cranky (disambiguation)
