= Crank (surname) =

Crank is a surname. Notable people with the surname include:

- Anthony Crank, British television presenter
- John Crank (1916–2006), British mathematical physicist
- Marion H. Crank (1915–1994), Arkansas politician
- Patrick Crank, American lawyer

== See also ==
- Krank (disambiguation)
- Cronk (surname)
- Crook (surname)
