= Krank =

Krank may refer to:

- "Krank" (song), a 2011 song by industrial rock band KMFDM
- Krank Glacier, Antarctica
- Krank Manufacturing Company building in St. Paul, Minnesota
- Krank Park, Albany, New York
- Krank, the villain of the 1995 film The City of Lost Children
- Luther and Nora Krank, the main characters of the 2004 film Christmas with the Kranks, played by Tim Allen and Jamie Lee Curtis

== See also ==
- Crank (disambiguation)
