= Hook and Ladder No. 4 =

- U.S. National Register of Historic Places
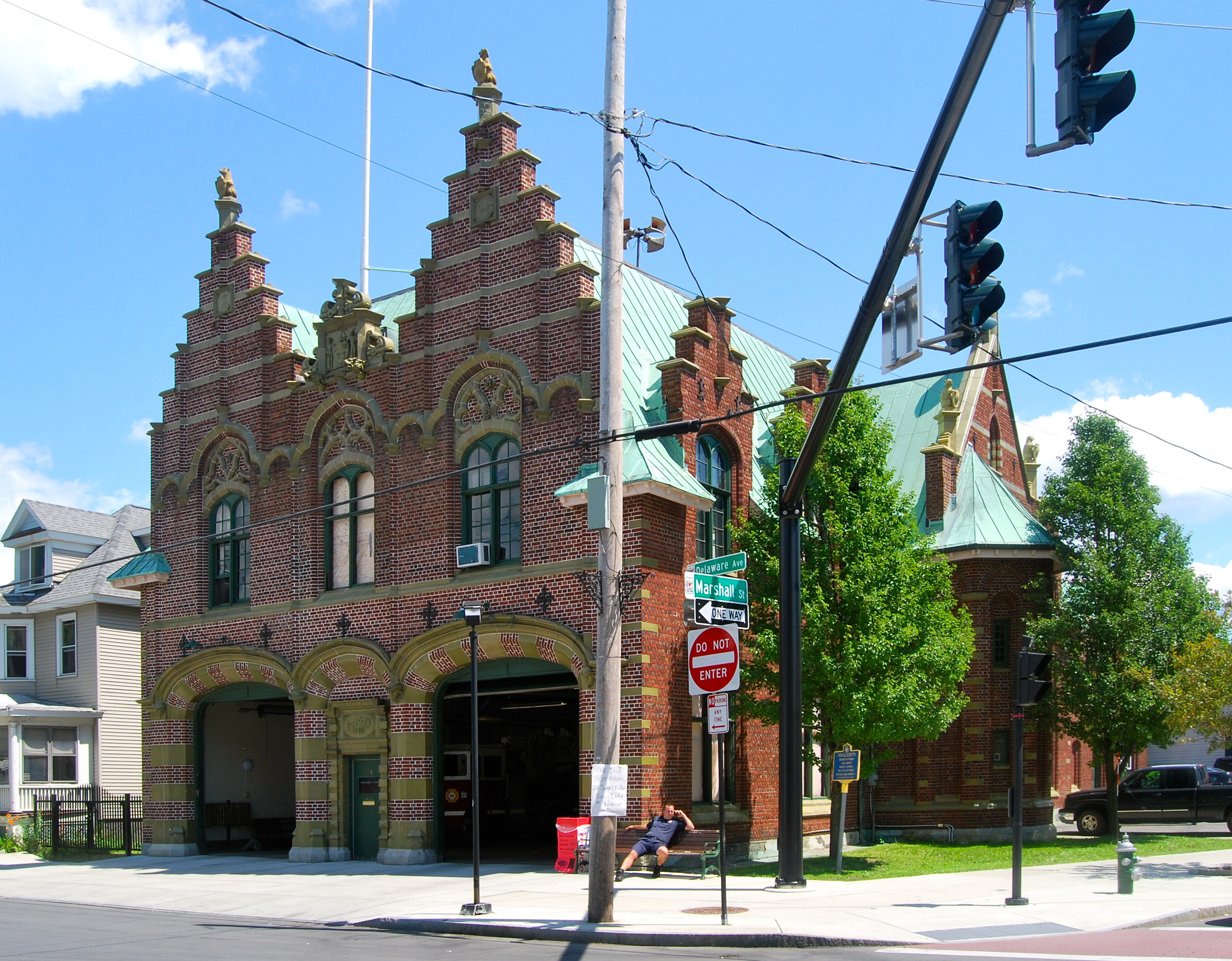
- North (front) elevation and west profile, 2011

- Location within New York Location within the United States
- Interactive map showing the location of Hook & Ladder No. 4
- Location: Albany, New York
- Coordinates: 42°38′30″N 73°46′49″W
- Area: less than one acre
- Built: 1909–1912.
- Architect: Marcus T. Reynolds
- Architectural style: Dutch Colonial Revival
- NRHP reference No.: 01000247
- Added to NRHP: March 12, 2001

Hook and Ladder No. 4, originally Truck No. 4, is a firehouse located at Delaware Avenue (U.S. Route 9W and New York State Route 443) in Albany, New York, United States. It is an elaborate brick structure in the Dutch Colonial Revival architectural style, designed by Albany architect Marcus T. Reynolds, and completed in 1912. In 2001 it was listed on the National Register of Historic Places.

It is one of Reynolds' few public buildings, and one of the rare uses of the Dutch Colonial Revival in a city established by Dutch colonists in the late 17th century. In addition to its distinctive stepped gable, the building also features terra cotta sculptures that illustrate Albany's history. Its construction reflected the city's expansion in the early 20th century, and it has remained in use as a firehouse.

== Building ==
The fire station is located on the southwest corner of the intersection, in southern Albany's Delaware Neighborhood. It is predominantly densely developed and residential, with single-family homes built later than the firehouse the predominant building type. Hook and Ladder No. 4 is on a short stretch of the south side of the street with some commercial buildings. Across from it, at the corner of Delaware and St. James Place, is the neighborhood's other major landmark, St. James' Catholic Church. Next to it is a large parking lot with a couple of buildings. Two blocks to the north, across Hackett Boulevard, is an expansive, more open area of larger institutional buildings, primarily those associated with Sage College of Albany and the South Clinical Campus of Albany Medical Center.

=== Exterior ===
The building itself is a two-and-a-half–story, three-by-six–bay structure of brick on a stone foundation laid in Flemish bond. In the joints the mortar is struck deep to produce a shadow effect in sunlight. It is topped by a hipped roof of copper with a four-horn fire siren in the center. A two-story engaged tower is on the south profile, along Marshall Street. A small one-and-a-half-story brick extension connects to the east (rear) elevation via hyphen.

On the first level the west (front) facade has two large gently arched slightly recessed garage openings flanking a main pedestrian entrance. The sides of the arches have alternating courses of brick and olive green terra cotta. Atop them is a molded terra cotta cornice rising from corbels in the shape of heads. Above the garages are two wrought iron crosses, with another one above the main entrance. Terra cotta also forms the quoins every sixth course on the corner towers up to the small peaked roofs. Along the side elevations are double-hung four-over-eight round-arched sash windows; those on the north have been bricked in.

The tower on the south is semi-octagonal in shape. Its facets have narrow recessed segmental arches with narrower versions of the four-over-eight windows divided by pilasters of alternating brick and terra cotta ending with a molded cornice of the latter at the arch springline. Around the base is another terra cotta feature, a water table. A wooden cornice with small wooden brackets marks the roofline, similar to the other towers and side elevations.

A continuous terra cotta course forms the sill of the three second-story windows, all recessed double four-over-eight sash. Only the tops of their arches are terra cotta; above each is a further distinctive pattern of that material, then a line of arches forming the base of the two six-step gables at the top of the facade. Each stage is set off by a terra cotta course with cornices on the steps. Two stages below the summit are medallions. Atop each gable is a small diamond-shaped pillar topped with a three-foot–tall (91 cm) beaver holding a shield. Between the two is an elaborate crest with two gargoyles holding the city's coat of arms.

Two smaller gables, with three steps apiece, rise from the northern two bays of the south facade. Their decoration is more restrained, with only iron fleur-de-lyses on the face. To their south, the tower's conical roof is engaged with an actual cross-gable that lacks the steps. At its sides are two more pillars with beavers atop. In its field is one central segmental-arched recessed sash window, with three plain terra cotta courses corresponding to its sill, springline and the base of an engaged pillar at the top. A single-bay rounded pediment is on the hyphen, and the rear extension also has a step-gabled roof paralleling the rear cross-gable.

=== Interior ===
An elaborate terra cotta surround frames the main entrance. Above the door is a plaque with "A.F.D., 1910" in raised lettering topped with a dentilled cornice. The pillars on the side have alternating raised bands.

The interior has been extensively renovated from its original appearance. The first story is mostly a single large bay for fire engines. It is floored in cement. The walls are painted white and the ceiling is of wood paneling stained dark brown. A chimney originally used when the firefighters had to heat water for their chemical pumper remains on the northeast. In the rear is the locker room on the southeast. Opposite it is a dining room/kitchen and some office space.

Upstairs are the firefighters' quarters, and a workout room. The interior of the rear extension has been converted from disused stable space and a hayloft to a lounge. In the base of the tower is a bathroom, recently renovated. The stairs to the second story take up the remainder of its space.

== History ==
Organized fire protection in Albany dates to the end of the 17th century. The city was then still known as Fort Orange from its Dutch origins. After several fires caused by stray chimney soot had damaged some houses, the city council ordered that each ward have two fire ladders ready for use. "Brant masters" were appointed to inspect chimneys every two weeks, and paid in wheat.

Later they were called "fyre masters" as the city began to further acknowledge the reality that it had been under English rule since the 1674 Treaty of Westminster. Further ordinances required that two full buckets of water be kept near any fireplace, with certain businesses required to have three. In 1732 the city bought its first piece of fire equipment, followed two years later by the construction of its first firehouse, at Beaver and South Pearl streets downtown. A second one was built six years later on State Street, then known as Yonkers Street.

Albany had established a public firefighting service, but it remained a volunteer fire department until 1867. By then the city had begun to expand beyond its earlier core, swelled by immigration and industrialization brought on by the development of the Erie Canal and the railroads. The newer buildings in the larger city required full-time professional firefighters.

Most of this early expansion took place to the south. By the early 20th century the South End had been built out and development moved up the hill to Delaware Turnpike, today's Delaware Avenue. In the 1900s a trolley line was established along the street. City government began discussing the need for a new fire station there, and residents of Marshall Street circulated a petition calling for one.

In 1909 the city council approved, among other infrastructure improvements for the area, appropriations of $38,000 ($1,362,000 in modern dollars) for the purchase and construction of a fire station at the corner of Delaware and Marshall. Local architect Marcus T. Reynolds was commissioned to design the new building. It would be his only public building that was not a school.

Reynolds' use of the Dutch Colonial Revival mode, with Flemish and Tudor Revival elements, was intended to pay homage to that era of the city's history, from which no buildings remain. Very few other buildings in Albany are built in it. The stepped gables were the most visible element, complemented by the extensive terra cotta decoration that told the history of the city. Local lore has it that the four heads which serve as the corbels for the arches on the first story are idealized portraits of Reynolds and three of Albany's more prominent public officials at that time. The beavers recall an early symbol of both the city and the state.

The station, then Truck No. 4, was designed with horse-drawn fire equipment in mind. In addition to the stables and hayloft in the rear, it had harnesses that dropped from the first floor ceiling onto the horses when the alarm sounded. That era would soon end, as Albany had introduced its first motorized fire vehicle that same year. In 1913 the station got a chemical wagon, and two years later its own first motorized vehicle. Its horses would be retired in 1919, when an engine was added to its first truck.

Two bigger engines were introduced in the early 1960s, one transferred from another company when it was closed. In 1991, the city hired the firm of Quackenbush & Tobin to design what ultimately turned out to be $350,000 in renovations to the interior. At that point many of the remaining features from the horse-drawn era were adapted for modern use, such as the conversion of the stable extension to a firefighters' lounge.

== See also ==
- National Register of Historic Places listings in Albany, New York
