= Lark Street =

Street in Albany, New York, United States

Coordinates: 42°39′18.1″N 73°45′54.2″W

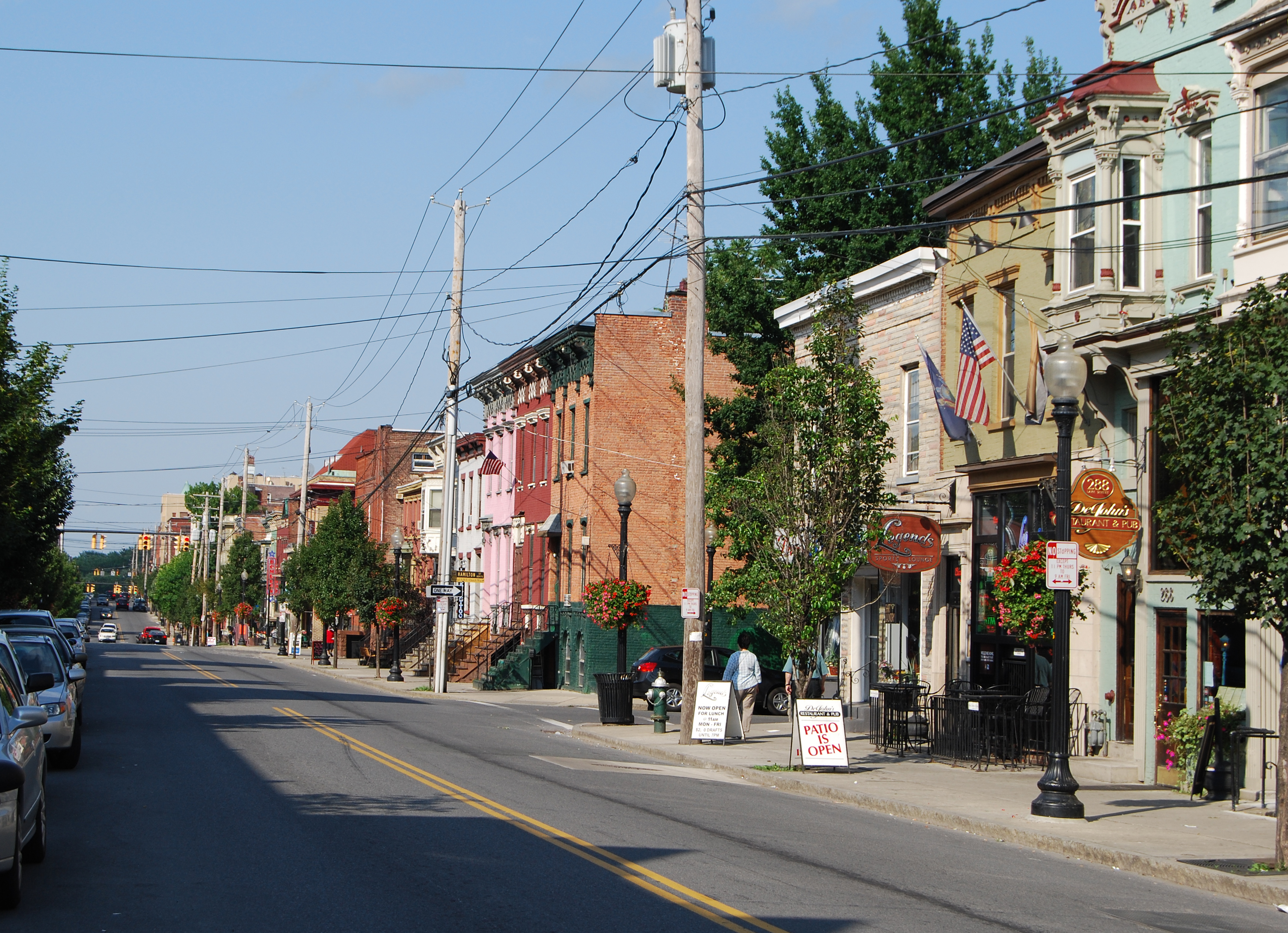
Lark Street near the intersection with Madison

Lark Street is a historic street in Albany, New York, US. It is part of the Arbor Hill, Sheridan Hollow, Center Square, Park South and Hudson/Park neighborhoods, and is located one block east of Washington Park. Lark Street is the site of many independently owned shops, coffee houses, restaurants, art galleries, antique shops, marketing agencies, bars and tattoo shops. Although the part between Madison Avenue and Washington Avenue was rebuilt in 2002-2003 to place new roadways, trees and sidewalks in front of the new shops in the active portion of Lark Street, some local residents have protested against the neglect of the northern end of the street (crossing north of Washington Avenue), which runs down into the less-affluent Arbor Hill neighborhood. Lark Street and Jay Street was used as a location during the filming of Ironweed. The Washington Avenue Armory is located at the corner of Lark Street and Washington Avenue.

== Location ==
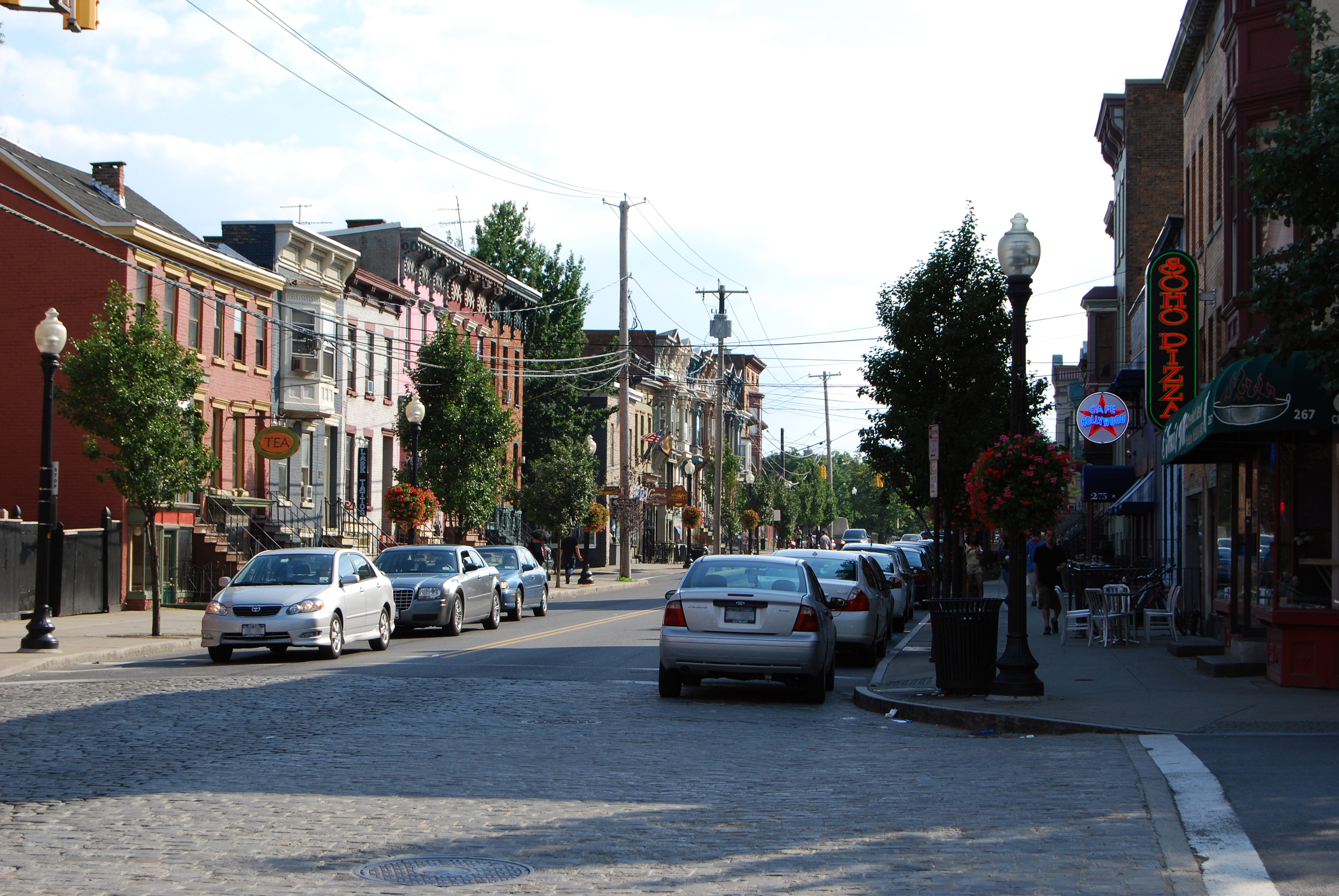
Looking toward Madison Avenue

Lark Street is located two long blocks west of the Empire State Plaza and one block east of Washington Park. Just a short walk from downtown Albany's business district, Lark Street has long been a mix of commercial and residential buildings that is reminiscent of some neighborhoods of Manhattan. Nineteenth century brownstone buildings are a common sight on the street. On parts of Lark Street (especially the intersection with Jay Street) cobblestone intersections remain from the turn-of-the century neighborhood this once was.

From south to north, Lark Street runs through the Park South, Hudson/Park, Center Square, Sheridan Hollow, and Arbor Hill neighborhoods in midtown Albany. It intersects with NY 443 (Delaware Avenue), US 20 (Madison Avenue), NY Route 5 (Washington Avenue), and US 9 (Clinton Avenue). From Madison Avenue to Clinton Avenue, Lark Street is part of U.S. Route 9W.

Lark Street is a critical public transportation route. Several CDTA buses run along all or part of Lark Street, including routes no.13 (New Scotland Avenue - to Slingerlands), no. 18 (Delaware Avenue - to Slingerlands via Delmar), no. 734 (Hackett Blvd./Buckingham Pond) and no. 763 (Route Twenty - to Schenectady via Guilderland).

== Culture ==
Lark Street's culture has been highlighted by the budget-minded Let's Go Travel Guides. A diverse range of artists and organizations has found their way to Lark Street - among them, the Upstate Artists Guild (UAG) which is working to get more galleries and studios into the downtown Albany and Troy areas. Because of this, and efforts from others, Lark Street's many historic apartment buildings have been turned into galleries and artist studios. Lark Street is the crux of the 1st Friday events, a citywide arts show opening extravaganza organized by the UAG and managed by Michael Weidrich, a local artist.

Shopping is available, and many storefronts are tucked into basement-level or second-story shops, further lending to their appeal. Shoppers can find contemporary art, antiques, jewelry, vintage clothing, flowers, books and wine.

Lark Street has a variety of restaurants and eateries, including Tex-Mex, Greek, Thai, Indian, Hunan, Italian and Japanese restaurants. The original Bombers Burrito Bar franchise is on Lark Street. The Washington Avenue Armory, which is located at the corner of Lark Street and Washington Avenue, hosts sporting events and rock concerts.

Lark Street was an important part of the new wave, punk and alternative music scene from 1979-1984, with the Lark Beat music store and 288 Lark playing key roles. Virtually every prominent local musician in Albany plays regularly on Lark Street, including the jazz saxophone player and band leader Brian Patneaude, Thomasina Winslow, her late father Tom Winslow and Sirsy.

The oldest theater, and one of the oldest buildings on Lark Street, is the eba Theater at 351 Hudson Avenue. It was built in 1916 by the Order of the Eastern Star, and it was sold to the arts organization, eba, Inc. in 1977.

== Gay village ==
There are two gay bars and the Capital District Gay and Lesbian Community Center catering to LGBT clientele in the Lark Street area. The annual Gay Pride parade marches down Lark Street in June.

== Art on Lark and LarkFEST ==
During the annual Art on Lark in June, the street is transformed by artists' displays including painters, photographers, jewelers, sculptors, ceramicists, glass artists, live performances and music on several stages. The event has an average attendance of 20,000 people. Art on Lark is the second largest street festival in upstate New York, second only to LarkFEST, and has been voted as the Best Arts Event in the Times Union Readers Poll in 2009 and 2010.

LarkFEST is the largest one day street festival in New York with attendance reaching 80,000 people. This event showcases local, regional and national musical acts as well as around 150 arts and crafts, retail and food vendors. In 2009, artists included Moby, Matt and Kim, Company of Thieves and Bell X1.

Both events are organized by the Lark Street BID (Business Improvement District), a not-for-profit organization that serves "To build, sustain, and enhance a unique and prosperous living and business community for the residents, merchants, and visitors of the Lark Street neighborhood of Albany, NY". This is done through providing core neighborhood services focused on neighborhood safety, street maintenance, neighborhood marketing and special events and promotions.

== See also ==
- Neighborhoods of Albany, New York
- Streets of Albany, New York
