= Neighborhoods of Albany, New York =

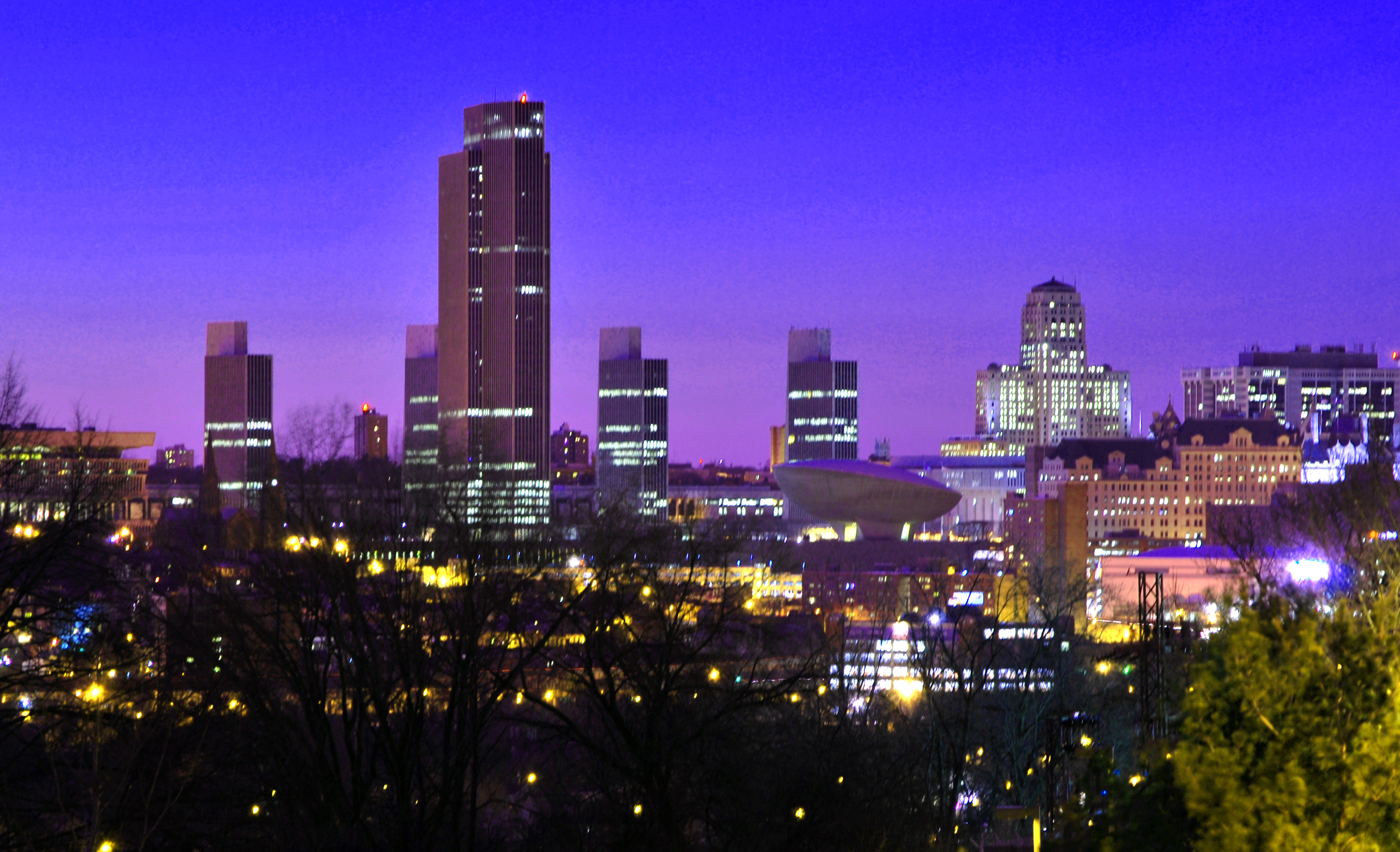
Albany skyline

The neighborhoods of Albany, New York are listed below.

== Arbor Hill ==
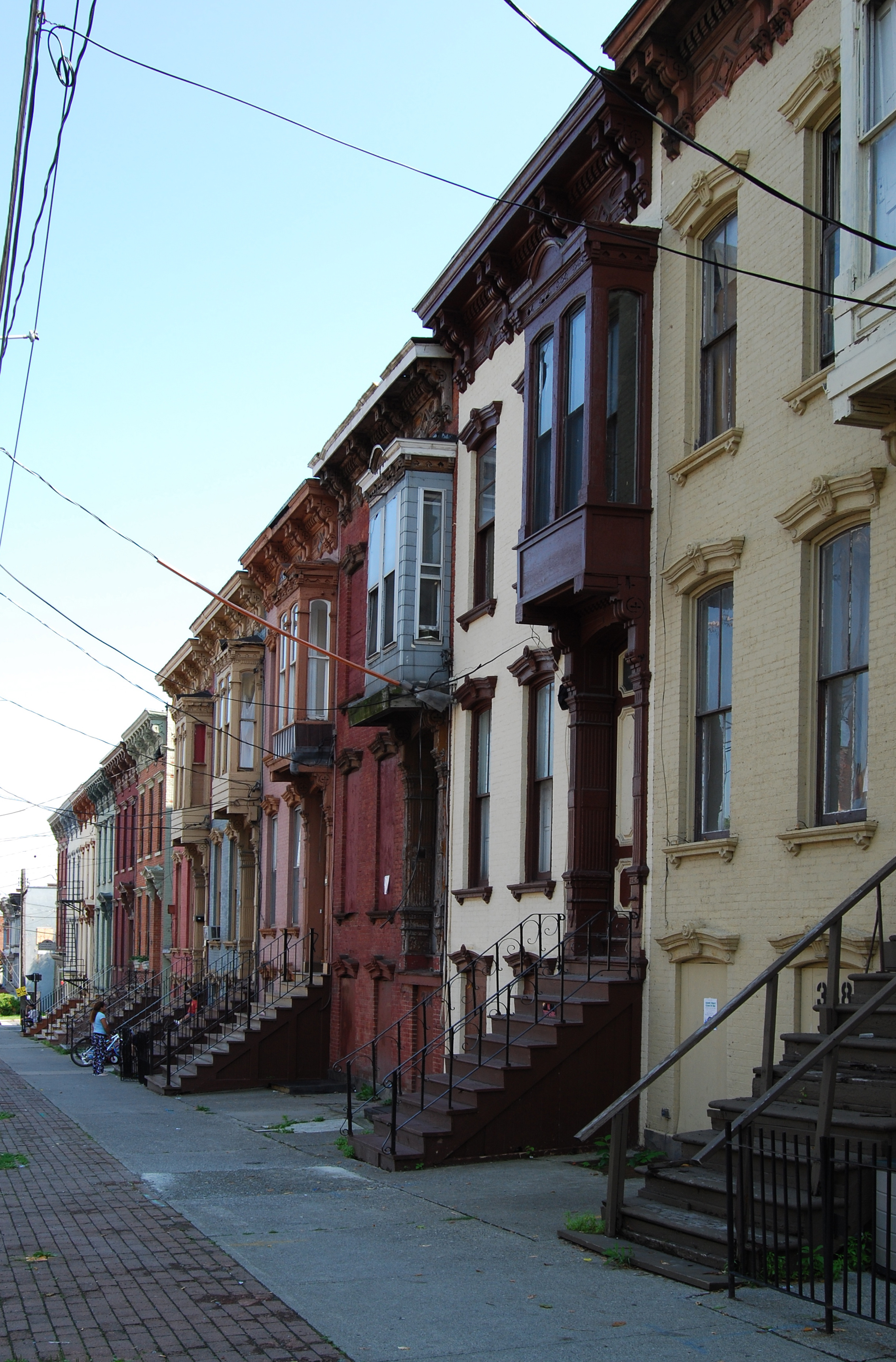
Houses on Clinton Avenue, Arbor Hill

Arbor Hill is an historic neighborhood in northeastern Albany near the Hudson River. Arbor Hill encompasses the area from Clinton Avenue (formerly called Patroon Street) north to the Livingston Avenue Railroad Bridge (where North Albany begins) and from the Hudson River west to Henry Johnson Boulevard. Arbor Hill was outside Albany's first boundaries as set up in the Dongan Charter of 1686. The original name of the area was Colonie. Incorporated as a village on April 9, 1804, Arbor Hill was annexed by the city in 1815, at which time Patroon Street became Clinton Avenue. The name "Arbor Hill" comes from the nickname of the Ten Broeck Mansion, an important cultural and historical destination in the neighborhood. Arbor Hill includes Dudley Heights, a residential neighborhood north of Livingston Avenue that was the first location of the Dudley Observatory. Demographically, Arbor Hill is predominantly African-American.

== Buckingham Lake ==
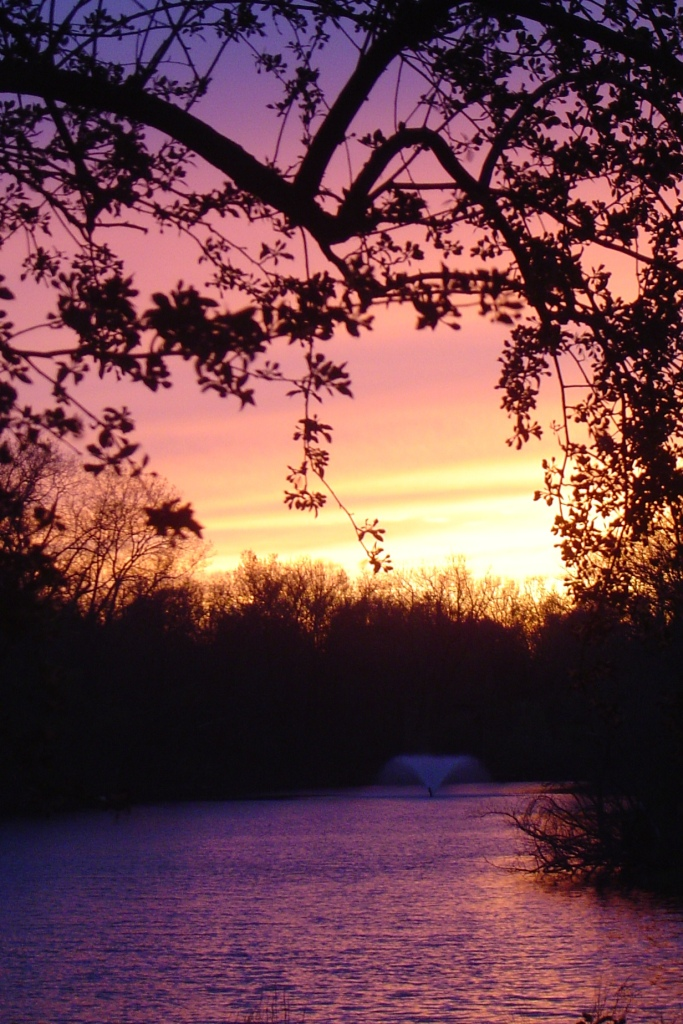
Buckingham Lake

The Buckingham Lake neighborhood is bordered by Western Avenue on the north, Route 85 on the west, Krumkill Road and New Scotland Avenues on the south, and South Manning Boulevard on the east.

== Center Square ==
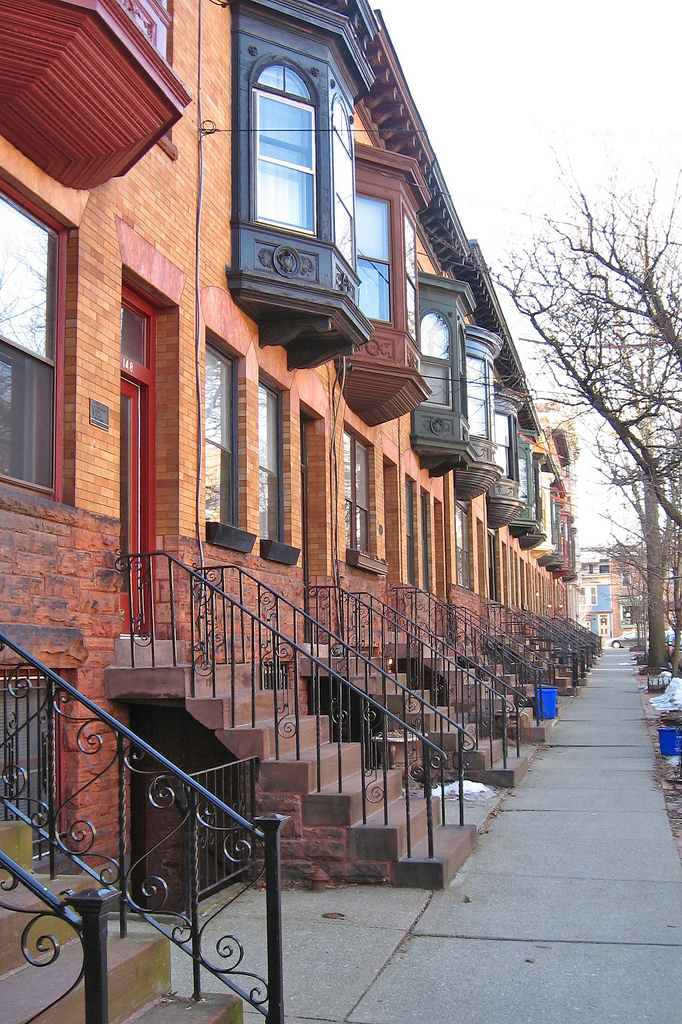
Brides' Row, located on Chestnut Street in the Center Square neighborhood

Center Square contains many buildings of architectural significance and is locally famous for its nightlife, entertainment, culture, and dining. Center Square includes the area bounded by Lark Street on the west, Spring Street on the north, South Swan Street on the east and Jay Street on the south, as well as the upper portion of Lancaster Street between Lark Street and Willett Street. It is included in its entirety within the Center Square/Hudson–Park Historic District. Center Square is also notable for its close proximity to Washington Park. Center Square and the Hudson/Park neighborhood to the south are often compared to New York City's Greenwich Village for their eclectic mix of residential and commercial uses, including bars, night clubs, restaurants, and unique stores. Albany's gay culture is vibrant in this area.

== Eagle Hill ==
Eagle Hill is a residential neighborhood in western Albany near the Town of Guilderland that is named for the Eagle Hill Cemetery. Eagle Hill is a large neighborhood "bounded by the [W. Averell Harriman State Office Building Campus] to the north, parts of Krumkill Road and the State Thruway (Interstate 87) to the south, an assortment of streets to the west (including Arch Avenue, North Bridge Drive and Wood Street), and Route 85 and the Buckingham Lake neighborhood to the east." Eagle Hill is an ethnically diverse community that has been described as "a tranquil, pretty place with narrow, tree-lined streets and small city lots with a mix of housing styles."

== Manning Boulevard ==
While Manning Boulevard runs for several miles from the north side of Albany to the south side of the city, the Manning Boulevard neighborhood "encompasses the area on both sides of Manning Boulevard between Washington and Western Avenues." This small neighborhood is unusual in the City of Albany because of the carriage paths that run on either side of this stretch of Manning Boulevard. According to the Manning Boulevard Neighborhood Association, these carriage paths were created in the late nineteenth century.

== Melrose ==
Melrose is a neighborhood east of the State Office Campus which features mostly one-family homes and includes Rosemont Park. Located in western Albany, Melrose is roughly bounded by Washington Avenue to the north, Western Avenue to the south, Brevator Street to the west, and Manning Boulevard to the east. Melrose Avenue itself is built on the right-of-way of the first passenger railroad in the state of New York, which ran from Albany to Schenectady. The historic Jesse Buel House is located in Melrose. Melrose has been described as "a cute family neighborhood with some history" and "a quiet, pretty place with older houses in a wide assortment of styles."

== Normanskill ==
The Normanskill neighborhood draws its name from the Normans Kill, a creek that forms part of Albany's southern boundary. Normanskill includes the former Hamlets of Hurstville and Karlsfeld, which were annexed from the Town of Bethlehem in 1967.

== North Albany ==
North Albany was settled in the mid-17th century by the Patroon of Rensselaerswyck and his tenants and later became a hamlet in the town of Watervliet. North Albany is located roughly between the Town of Colonie, New York and Village of Menands, New York to the north, the Livingston Avenue railroad bridge to the south, the Hudson River to the east, and Van Rensselaer Boulevard to the west.

== Park South ==
Tucked between University Heights and the southern edge of Washington Park, the small neighborhood of Park South underwent urban renewal efforts in the early 21st century, with existing housing units being removed or renovated and new office, commercial, and apartment buildings being added.

== Pine Hills ==
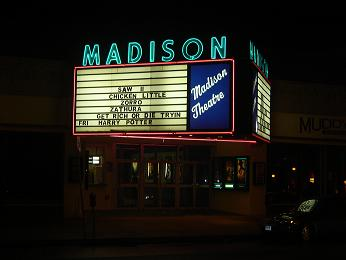
Madison Theater, Pine Hills

The Pine Hills neighborhood is roughly bounded by Washington Avenue to the north, South Lake Avenue to the east, Woodlawn Avenue and Cortland Street to the south, and South Manning Boulevard to the west. Pine Hills received its name from the Albany Land Improvement Company in 1891. The neighborhood consists mainly of freestanding multi-unit, duplex, and semi-detached houses and is home to Albany High School, the LaSalle School, the College of St. Rose, and the Alumni Quad of the University at Albany. The area of Pine Hills east of Main Avenue and north of Myrtle Avenue is commonly referred to as the "student ghetto" due to its predominant population of college students, many from Long Island or New York City.

== South End ==
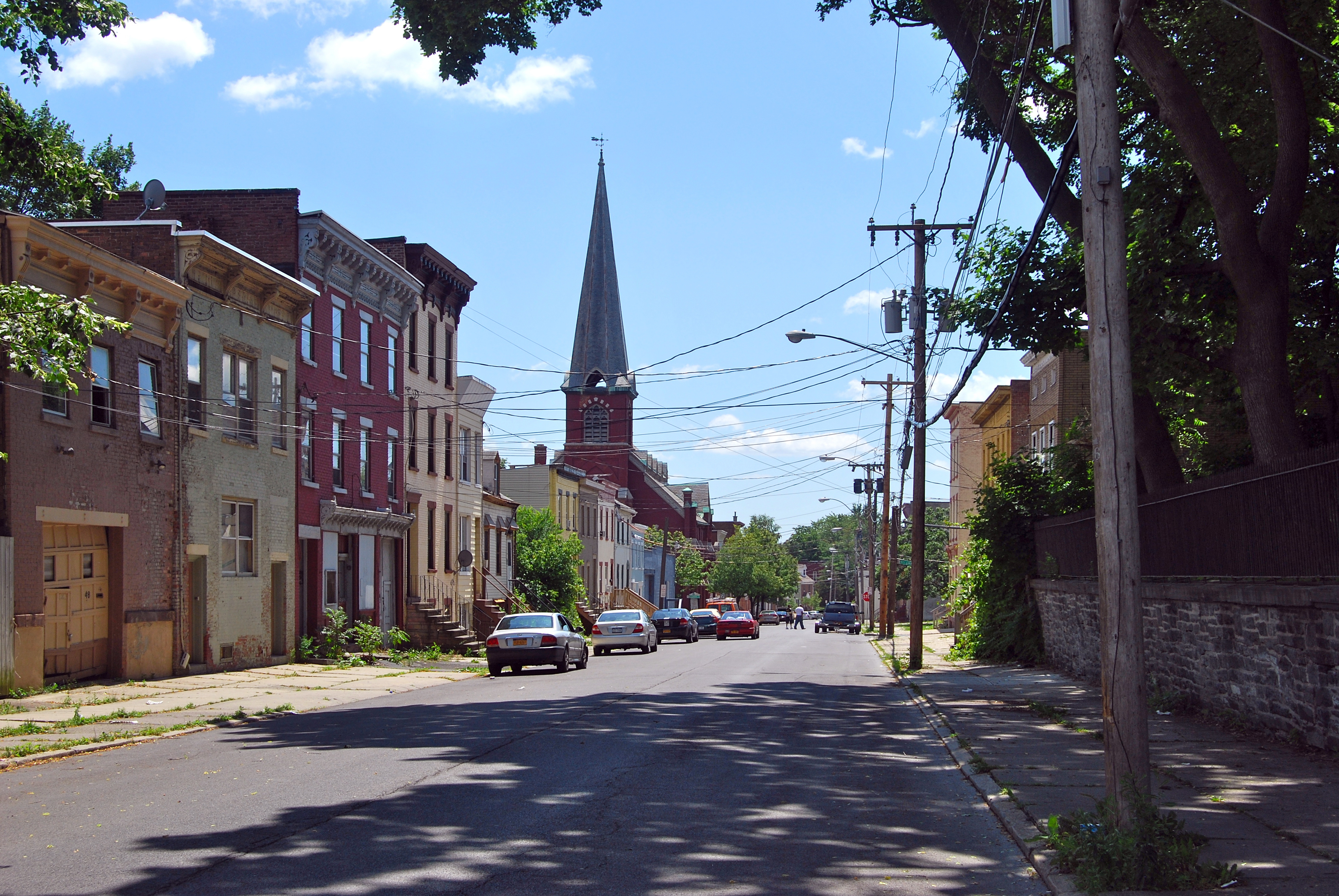
View south down Clinton Street toward German Evangelical Protestant Church, South End, Albany

A large and diverse area of Albany, the South End consists of several smaller neighborhoods. Neighborhoods within the South End include the following:

=== Delaware Avenue ===
Delaware Avenue is a main entrance to the city from the south, specifically the Bethlehem/Delmar area. The Delaware Avenue neighborhood is located southwest of the Empire State Plaza. Delaware Avenue is the western border of the South End. Only a small part of Delaware Avenue is considered the "Delaware Neighborhood". In recent years, Federal stimulus money was invested into the neighborhood to build new streets, lighting, trees, and contribute to safety.

=== Mansion District ===
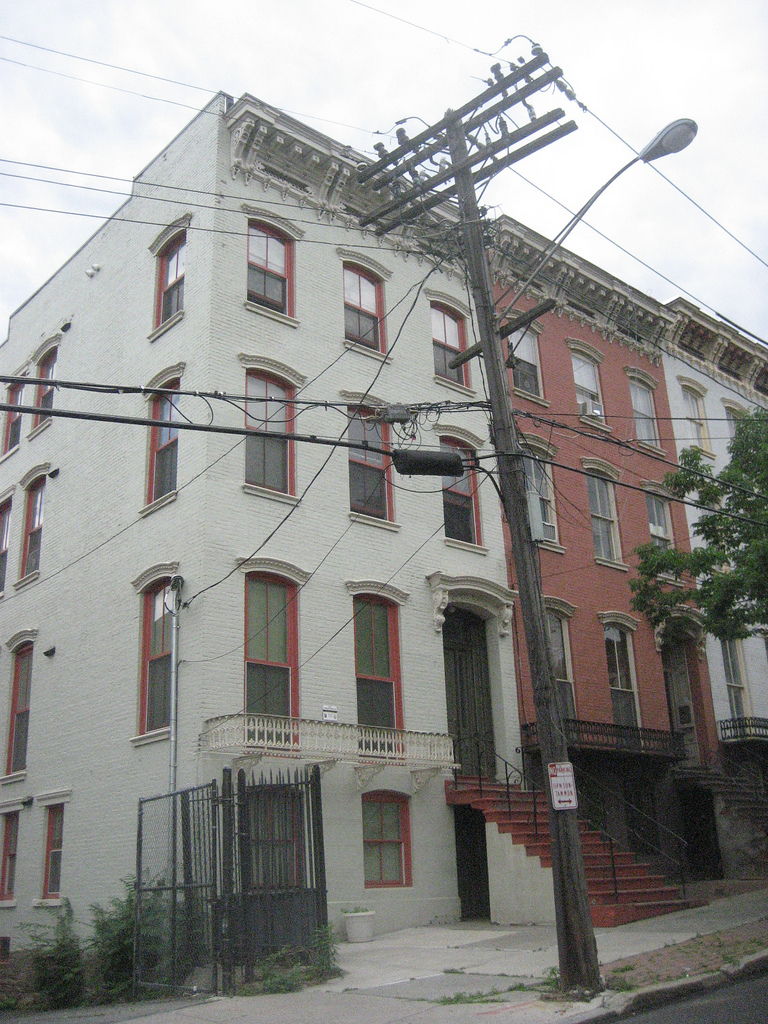
Townhouses in the Mansion District.

The Mansion neighborhood is dominated by the Governor's Mansion for which it is named. In the Mansion neighborhood, all major 19th-century architectural styles are represented. Italianate is the most widely represented style in the district, and it is present in many levels of sophistication. A number of buildings use elements of both the Greek Revival and Italianate styles, but there are also some highly refined examples of these individual styles. There are also some unusual examples of the application of Gothic Revival decoration to rowhouse construction.

== The Dunes ==
The Dunes is a neighborhood located in the long, narrow western protrusion of Albany known as the Pine Bush, west of Crossgates Mall. According to the City of Albany website, "the neighborhood has a distinctly suburban feel."

=== Rapp Road Community Historic District ===
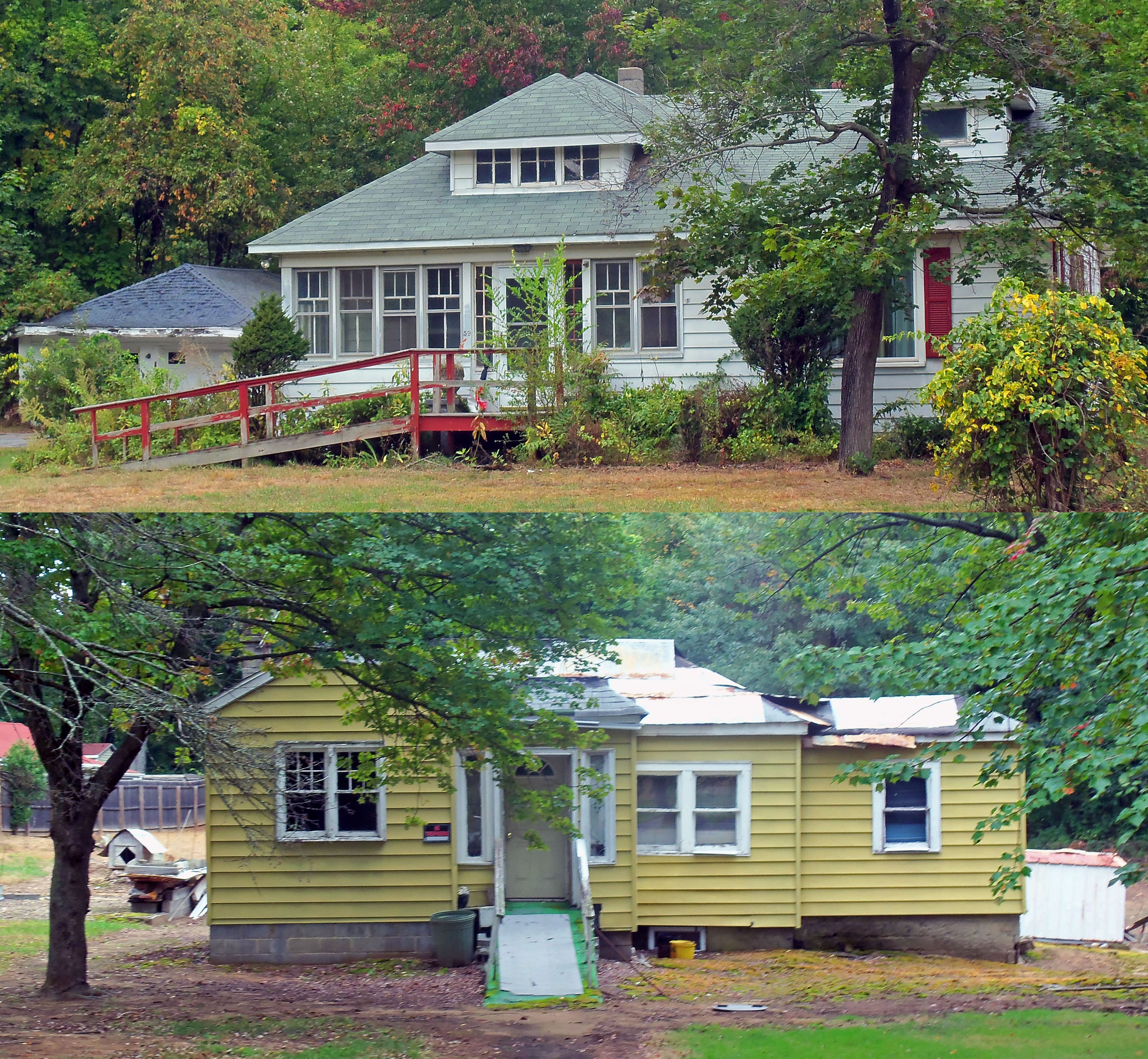
67 and 68 Rapp Road

The Rapp Road Community Historic District is a 14-acre (5.7 ha) residential area that was listed on the National Register of Historic Places in 2002. The District is a rare intact example of a chain migration community from the Great Migration—the movement of 6 million African-Americans out of the rural Southern United States to the urban Northeast, Midwest, and West that occurred between 1916 and 1970.

The Rapp Road Community Historic District lies along Rapp Road between Pine Lane and the South Frontage Road of Washington Avenue Extension. The District lies just north of the boundary between the City of Albany and the Town of Guilderland.

== University Heights ==
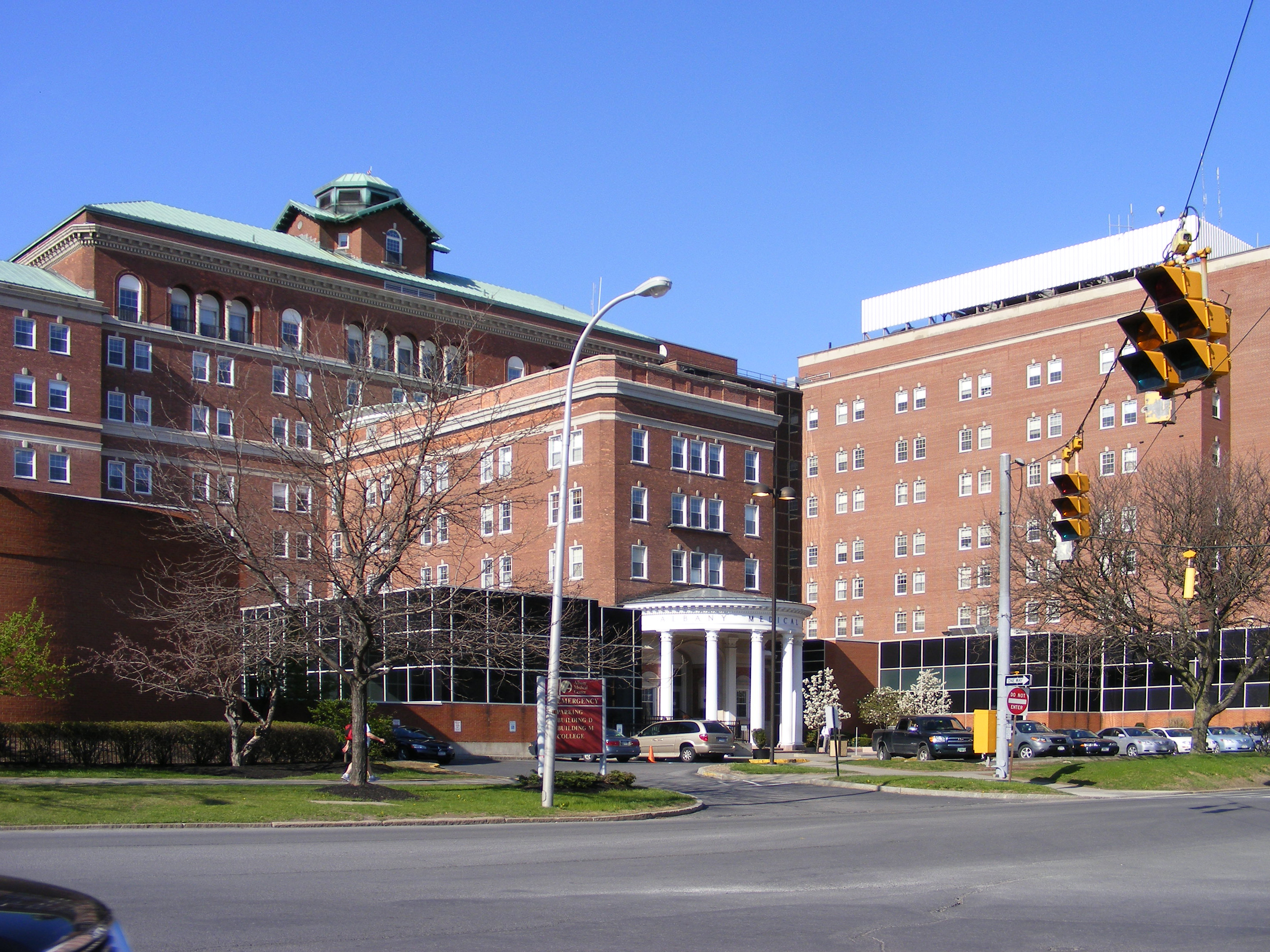
Albany Medical Center

University Heights is home to the Albany College of Pharmacy, Albany Law School, Sage College of Albany, and Albany Medical College, which is part of the Albany Medical Center.

== West Hill ==
West Hill stretches from Central Avenue north to Tivoli Hollow, and from Henry Johnson Boulevard west to Manning Boulevard. A low-income neighborhood, West Hill is dominated by Central Avenue, which is Albany's "Main Street" and an important thoroughfare into Albany, and by Clinton and Livingston Avenues. West Hill is a primarily African-American neighborhood.

== Other neighborhoods ==
- Beverwyck
- Helderberg
- Hudson/Park
- New Scotland/Woodlawn
- Pastures
- Sheridan Hollow
- Washington Square
- West Hill
- Whitehall

== See also ==
- History of Albany, New York
- National Register of Historic Places listings in Albany, New York
- Streets of Albany, New York
- Washington Park Historic District (Albany, New York)
