= New York State Route 157A =

State highway in Albany County, New York, US

New York State Route 157A
- NY 157A highlighted in red

Route information
- Auxiliary route of NY 157
- Maintained by NYSDOT
- Length: 5.88 mi (9.46 km)
- Existed: 1930–present

Major junctions
- West end: NY 157 in Knox
- East end: NY 157 in Berne

Location
- Country: United States
- State: New York
- Counties: Albany

Highway system
- New York Highways; Interstate; US; State; Reference; Parkways
| ← NY 157 | → NY 158 |

New York State Route 157A (NY 157A) is an east–west state highway located in Albany County, New York, in the United States. It serves as a 5.88-mile-long (9.46 km) loop route of NY 157 through the towns of Knox and Berne, veering a considerable distance to the south to serve the hamlet of East Berne and indirectly connect NY 157 to NY 443. NY 157A rejoins NY 157 near the access road to Thompson's Lake State Park, which is along NY 157. It is a two-lane highway its entire length. NY 157A, like its parent route, was assigned in 1930 to its current routing.

== Route description ==
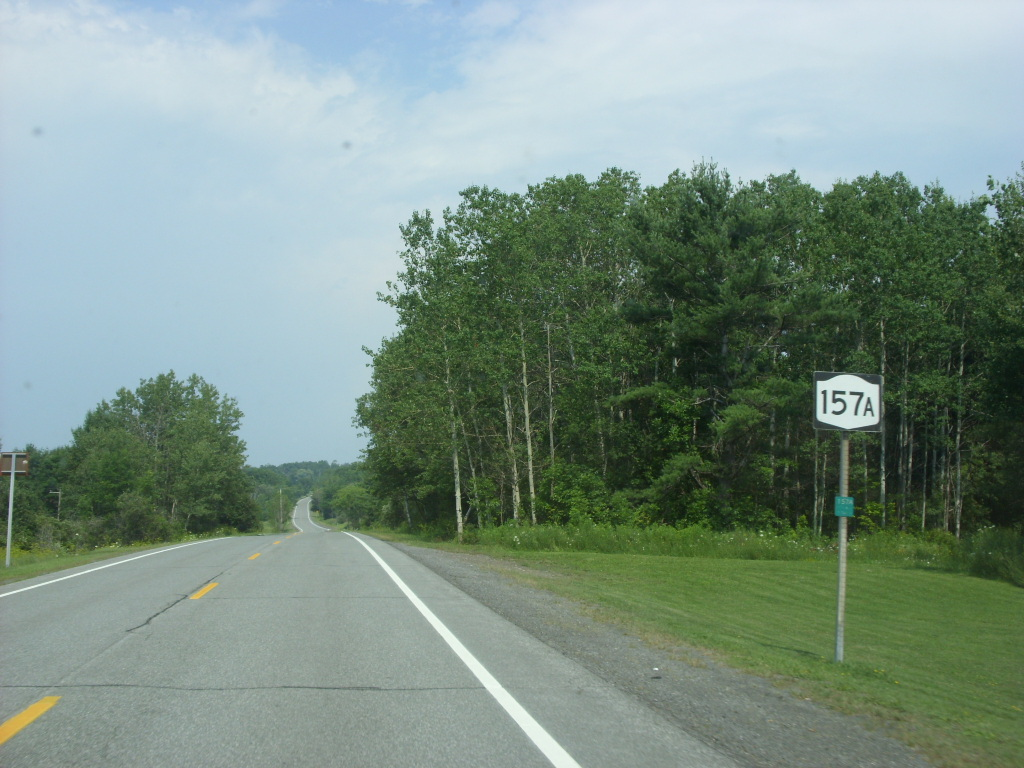
Eastbound on NY 157A in Berne between Warner Lake and Thompson Lake

NY 157A begins at a rural intersection with NY 157 in the southeastern portion of the town of Knox. Although it is signed as an east–west route, it heads generally southwestward at first, following the two-lane Warners Lake Road through a forested yet populated area just south of NY 157. The homes and forests give way to open fields soon afterward, and the rolling terrain follows NY 157A into the adjacent town of Berne. Here, the number of homes alongside the highway rises as it approaches Warner Lake, a small waterbody northwest of the hamlet of East Berne. It runs along the eastern shore of the lake, serving a continuous line of residences on its way to a junction with Thacher Lake Road at the southeastern corner of the lake.

At this point, Warners Lake Road ends and NY 157A turns left to return to the northeast along Thacher Lake Road, creating a near U-turn in the route's alignment. South of the junction, Thacher Lake Road continues to an intersection with NY 443 in nearby East Berne as NY 910J, an unsigned reference route. From Warner Lake, NY 157A proceeds across another stretch of open, undeveloped terrain, passing only a handful of homes before terminating at a junction with NY 157 in the hamlet of Thompson's Lake. The waterbody that gives the community its name is due north of the junction, and Thompson's Lake State Park is a short distance to the northwest along NY 157.

== History ==
The east half of modern NY 157A was originally designated as part of Route 7, an unsigned legislative route, by the New York State Legislature in 1908. Route 7 entered Berne from the west on what is now NY 443 and followed it to East Berne, from where it continued northeastward to Thompson's Lake on current NY 910J and NY 157A. At Thompson's Lake, the route proceeded northeastward onto modern NY 157 and continued toward Albany. The remainder of what is now NY 157A was state-maintained by 1926. The entirety of NY 157A, including the segment not part of legislative Route 7, was assigned in 1930.

== Major intersections ==
The entire route is in Albany County.

| Location | mi | km | Destinations | Notes |
|---|---|---|---|---|
| Knox | 0.00 | 0.00 | NY 157 (Thompsons Lake Road) – Altamont, Thacher Park, Thompsons Lake | Western terminus |
| Berne | 3.74 | 6.02 | To NY 443 via Thatcher Park Road (NY 910J) – East Berne | Hamlet of East Berne |
| Berne | 5.88 | 9.46 | NY 157 (Thompsons Lake Road / Thatcher Park Road) – Altamont, Thacher Park, Thompsons Lake | Eastern terminus |
1.000 mi = 1.609 km; 1.000 km = 0.621 mi
