= New York State Route 157 =

State highway in Albany County, New York, US

New York State Route 157
- Map of Albany County in eastern New York with NY 157 highlighted in red

Route information
- Maintained by NYSDOT
- Length: 9.24 mi (14.87 km)
- Existed: 1930–present

Major junctions
- West end: NY 156 in Berne
- East end: NY 85 in New Scotland

Location
- Country: United States
- State: New York
- Counties: Albany

Highway system
- New York Highways; Interstate; US; State; Reference; Parkways
← NY 156	→ NY 157A

New York State Route 157 (NY 157) is a state highway in Albany County, New York, in the United States. It runs from an intersection with NY 156 near the hamlet of Berne to a junction with NY 85 in the hamlet of New Salem. NY 157 is a two-lane, narrow, winding route that runs along an escarpment overlooking the Capital District. The route provides access to John Boyd Thacher State Park and Thompson's Lake State Park. NY 157 was assigned to its current alignment as part of the 1930 renumbering of state highways in New York.

== Route description ==
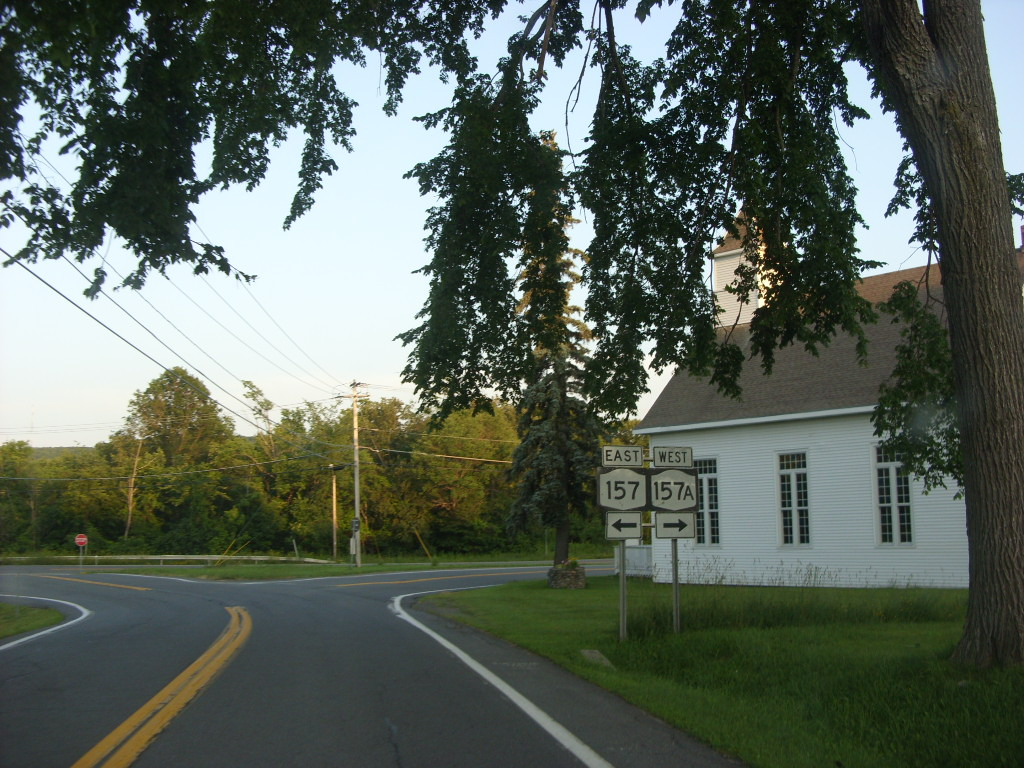
NY 157 at the junction with NY 157A in Thompson's Lake

NY 157 begins at an intersection with NY 156 (Berne–Altamont Road) in the town of Berne. The route proceeds southeast along Thompson's Lake Road, a two-lane, rural, asphalt road through Berne and climbing down a hill before reaching an intersection with NY 157A (Warners Lake Road). After NY 157A, the route runs east through Berne, reaching an intersection with Old Stage Road. At this junction, the route turns southward, crossing past more residences and farms and an intersection with the western terminus of County Route 256 (CR 256, named Ketcham Road). At the junction with Singer Road, NY 157 turns southeast once again, crossing past similar surroundings.

The direction changes again southward as NY 157 passes the campground for Thompson's Lake State Park. Now running lakeside, the route turns southeast along the southern shore of Thompson's Lake, passing many waterside residences. After leaving the lakeside, NY 157 enters the hamlet of Thompson's Lake, a small community based around the junction of NY 157, NY 157A, (Thacher Park Road) and CR 303 (Beaver Dam Road). At the junction, located to the southeast of Thompson's Lake Rural Cemetery, NY 157A terminates at NY 157, which turns north on Thacher Park Road. CR 303 begins westward on the right-of-way seceded by NY 157. Now running north, NY 157 leaves the hamlet, running east of the lake.

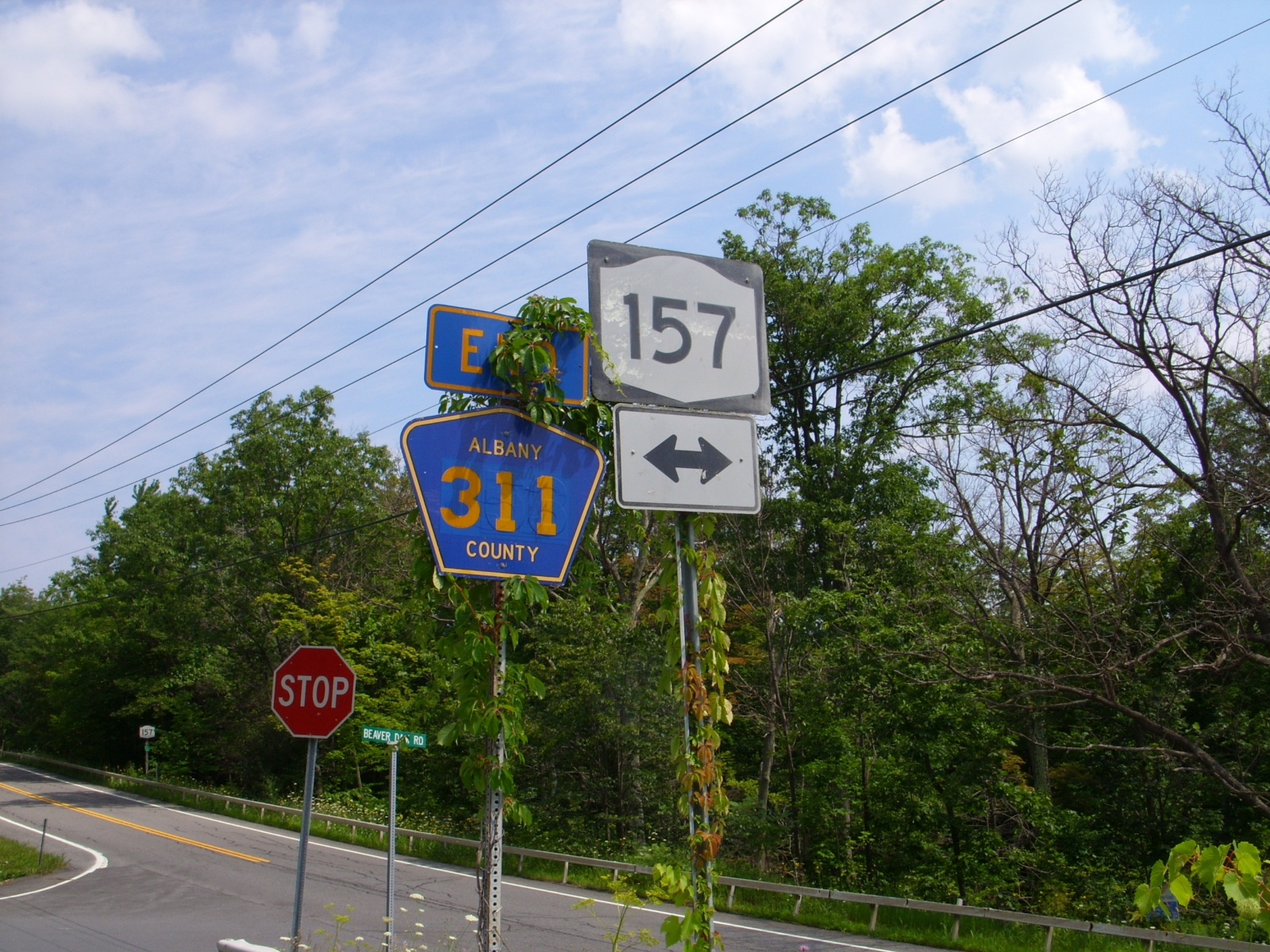
The junction of NY 157 and CR 311 in New Scotland, seen from CR 311

After making a bend to the northeast, the route junctions with the eastern terminus of CR 256, where NY 157 turns eastward through Berne. Making a large bend to the southeast, NY 157 crosses into John Boyd Thacher State Park, passing multiple entrances and parking lots into various park attractions. Through the park, NY 157 makes various directional changes, but maintains a generally southeast progression, crossing into the town of New Scotland within the park grounds. After leaving the park, the route retains the Thacher Park Road moniker, winding southeast through dense wilderness of New Scotland. Turning to the south, NY 157 junctions with the terminus of CR 311 (Beaver Dam Road). After one more bend to the east, the route intersects with NY 85 (New Scotland Road). This junction, located in the hamlet of New Salem, serves as the eastern terminus of NY 157.

== History ==
In 1908, the New York State Legislature created Route 7, an unsigned legislative route extending from Binghamton to Albany via Oneonta, and Schoharie. In western Albany County, Route 7 utilized what is now NY 443 from the Schoharie County line to East Berne, where it turned north to follow Thatcher Park Road (now NY 910J and NY 157A) to Thompson's Lake. From there, it continued eastward on modern NY 157 to its terminus at NY 85, at which point Route 7 continued northeastward on current NY 85 toward Albany. The segment of legislative Route 7 between Thompson's Lake and New Scotland Road was not assigned a posted designation until the 1930 renumbering of state highways in New York when it became part of the new NY 157, which continued west from Thompson's Lake to NY 146 (now NY 156) southwest of Altamont.

== NY 157A ==

NY 157A (5.88 miles or 9.46 kilometres) is a two-laned loop off of NY 157 in Berne that veers to the south to serve the hamlet of East Berne and nearby Warner Lake. At East Berne, it connects to NY 443 via Thacher Lake Road (designated NY 910J, an unsigned reference route). The route was assigned in the early 1930s.

== Major intersections ==
The entire route is in Albany County.

Location	mi	km	Destinations	Notes
Knox	0.00	0.00	NY 156 (Berne–Altamont Road) – Knox, Altamont	Western terminus
Knox	0.61	0.98	NY 157A east (Warners Lake Road)	Western terminus of NY 157A
Berne	3.54	5.70	NY 157A west (Thacher Park Road) – Warner Lake, East Berne	Eastern terminus of NY 157A
New Scotland	9.24	14.87	NY 85 (New Scotland Road) – New Salem, Rensselaerville	Eastern terminus
1.000 mi = 1.609 km; 1.000 km = 0.621 mi
