= Griggs House (disambiguation) =

Griggs House is a historic house in Granite, Maryland.

Griggs House may also refer to:

- Clark R. Griggs House, in Urbana, Illinois
- Hiram Griggs House, in Albany County, New York
- Burbank–Livingston–Griggs House, in Saint Paul, Minnesota
- Fisher–Nash–Griggs House, in Ottawa, Illinois
