= Altamont Historic District =

Historic district in New York, United States

- U.S. National Register of Historic Places
- U.S. Historic district
- Location within New York Location within the United States
- Location: Main St. between Thacher Dr. and the RR station, Altamont, New York
- Coordinates: 42°42′6″N 74°1′51″W
- Area: 11 acres (4.5 ha)
- Architectural style: Greek Revival, Federal, Colonial Revival
- MPS: Guilderland MRA
- NRHP reference No.: 82001054
- Added to NRHP: November 10, 1982

The Altamont Historic District is a 11-acre (4.5 ha) historic district in Altamont, New York. It was listed on the National Register of Historic Places in 1982, at which time it included 18 contributing buildings.

The district includes Delaware and Hudson Railroad Passenger Station (Altamont, New York), a train station that was individually listed on the National Register already.

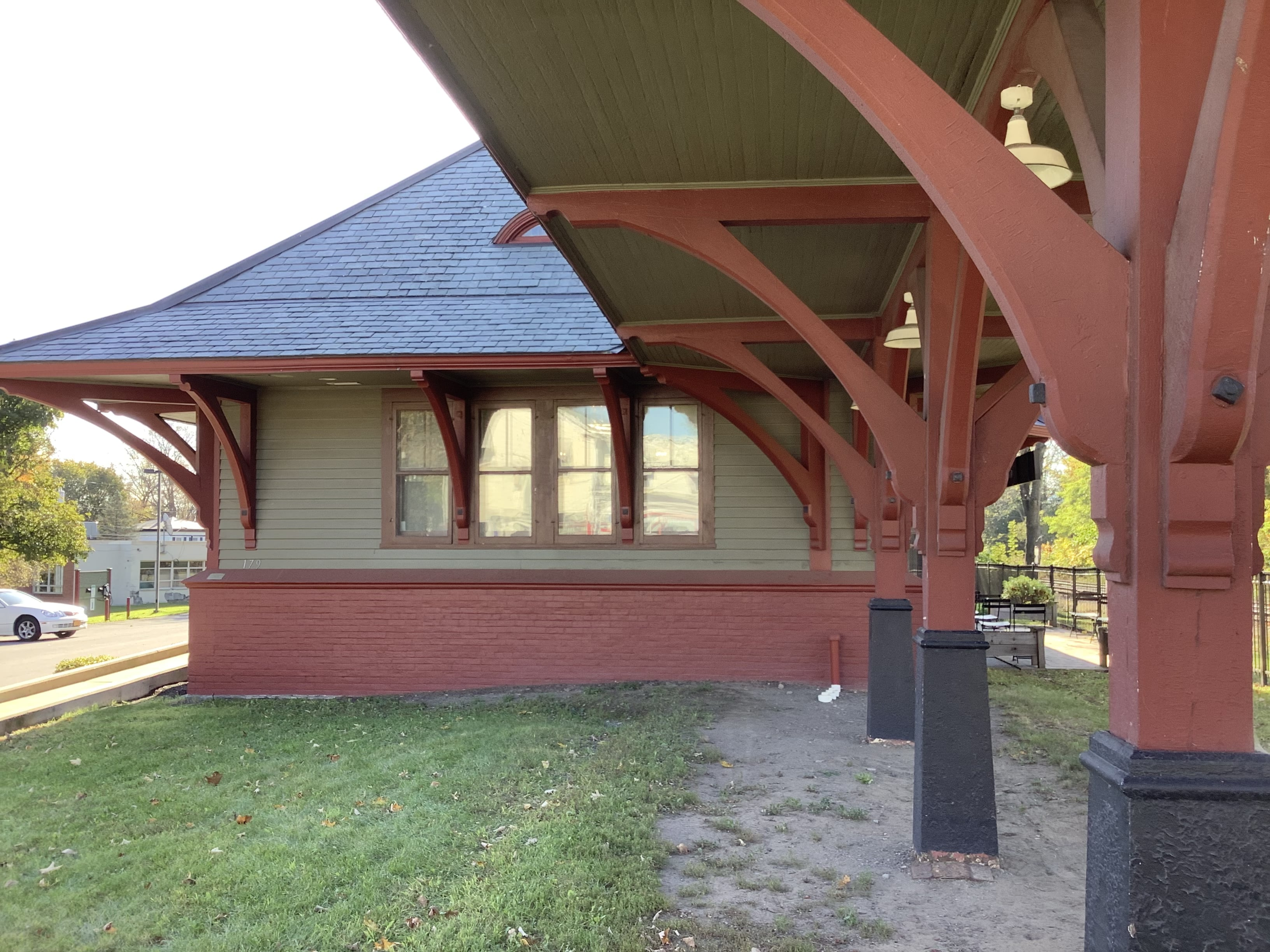
Altamont Historic District This building was built in 1897 on the Delaware & Hudson Line. The last train stopped in January 1963. In 2012, the building became the Altamont (NY) Free Library.

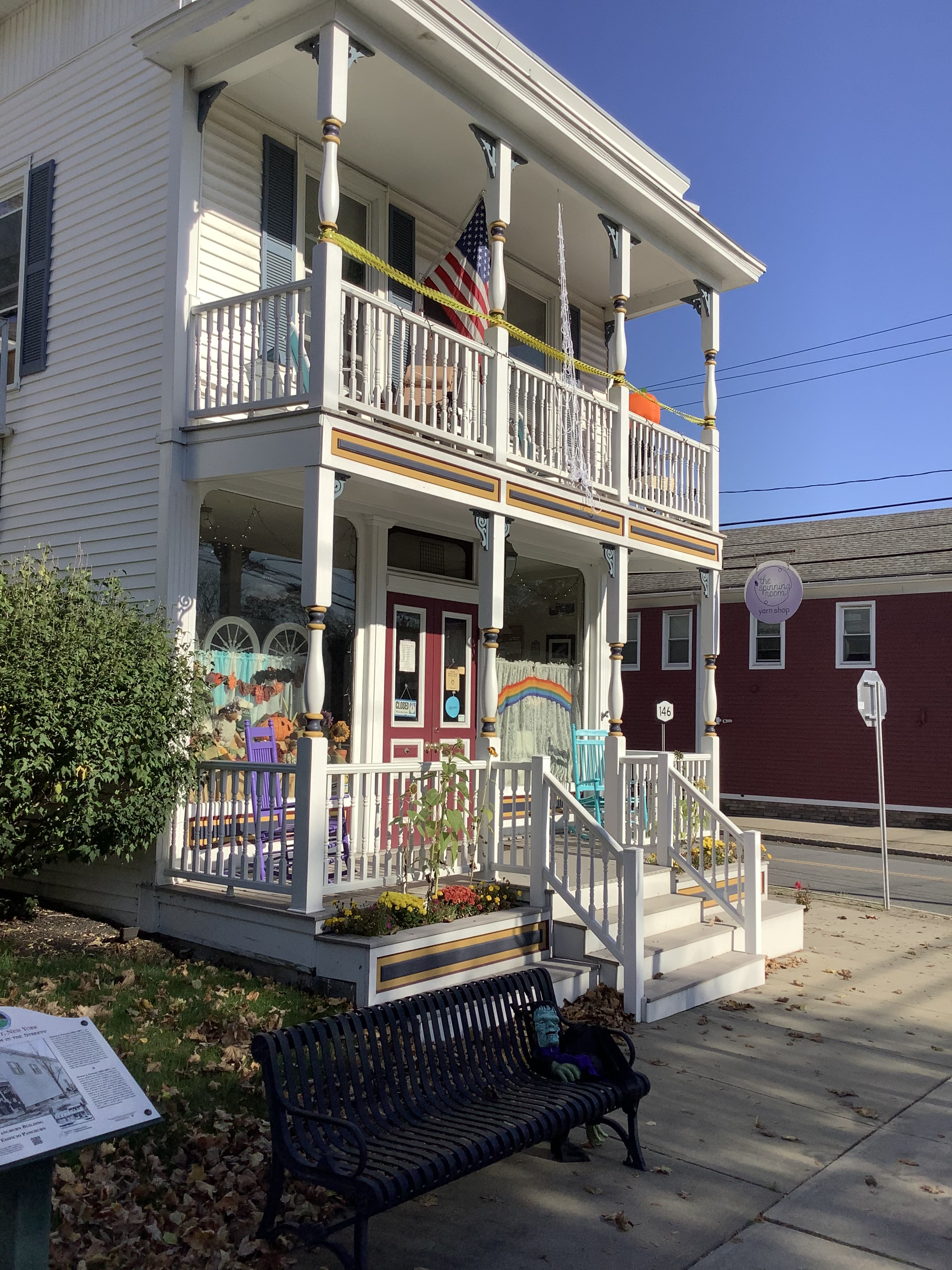
Pangburn Building, Main Street, Altamont, NY. Built in 1886.

Incomplete reference for Altamont HD, needs checking.
