= Altamont Fairgrounds =

Multi-purpose venue in Altamont New York, United States

- Interactive map of Altamont Fairgrounds
- Location: Altamont, New York
- Coordinates: 42.6982°N 74.0251°W
- Owner: Albany, Schenectady and Greene County Fair Association

The Altamont Fairgrounds is the home of the annual Albany-Schenectady-Greene County Fair. Open for over 160 years, the fairgrounds are utilized year-round and host a number of events. It is located in the Village of Altamont, New York.

== Facilities and events ==
=== Three County Fair ===
Altamont Fairgrounds hosted its first fair in September 1893, and entry cost 25 cents for adults. Schenectady County joined in 1922, two years before the fair’s first fireworks show. The fair suspended operations from 1942 to 1943 because of World War II, and Greene County joined in 1945. A year later, the fair association officially was renamed the Albany, Schenectady and Greene County Fair Association, making Altamont Fair the first (and only) three-county fair in New York state.

The annual fair brings rides, food, live music and myriad attractions to the region for six days. Entertainment choices include Central K-9's Dock Dogs Show, which brings agile pups to show off their skills in dock-diving, disc-catching and more.

=== Exhibition Hall ===
Listed on the National Register of Historic Places in 2004, the Fine Arts and Flower Building has been in continuous use at the fairgrounds since 1896.

=== Harvest Wine Festival ===
In addition to entertainment, the festival features vendors offering samples of fine wine, craft beverages, specialty foods and activities such as pumpkin carving, traversing a hay maze, draft horse wagon rides, and a car show.

=== Christmas Village ===
On weekends in December, the fairground provides activities such as roasting s'mores, photos with Santa, horse & wagon rides, a hot cocoa bar, a Christmas market, and ornament and cookie decorating.

=== Auto racing ===
When Altamont hosted the first annual Albany County Fair in 1893, the main event was harness horse racing. From the 1920s through 1955 the 1/2-mile (0.80 km) dirt oval operated as Altamont Speedway, featuring "big cars" sanctioned by the AAA, and becoming the home track of 1951 Indianapolis 500 champion Lee Wallard.

The racetrack also hosted two NASCAR Grand National (now NASCAR Cup Series) events, with Fonty Flock winning in 1951 and Junior Johnson claiming the 1955 race.
