= Lainhart =

Lainhart is a surname. Notable people with the surname include:

- Porter Lainhart (1907–1991), American football player
- Richard Lainhart (1953–2011), American composer

== See also ==
- Lainhart Farm Complex and Dutch Barn, farm complex in Altamont, New York
- Linhart
