= Knox District School No. 5 =

- U.S. National Register of Historic Places
- Location within New York Location within the United States
- Location: Ketchum Rd., Knox, New York
- Coordinates: 42°39′38″N 74°2′43″W
- Area: 1 acre (0.40 ha)
- Built: 1898
- NRHP reference No.: 05000441
- Added to NRHP: May 19, 2005

Knox District School No. 5 is a historic one-room school building located within Thompson's Lake State Park in the town of Knox in Albany County, New York. It was built in 1898 and is a one-story 20-by-24-foot (6.1 by 7.3 m) rectangular frame building on a dry laid stone foundation. School use ceased in 1940, and it has been vacant since 1999.

It was listed on the National Register of Historic Places in 2005.
