= Fine Arts and Flower Building, Altamont Fairground =

- Fine Arts and Flower Building Altamont Fairground
- U.S. National Register of Historic Places
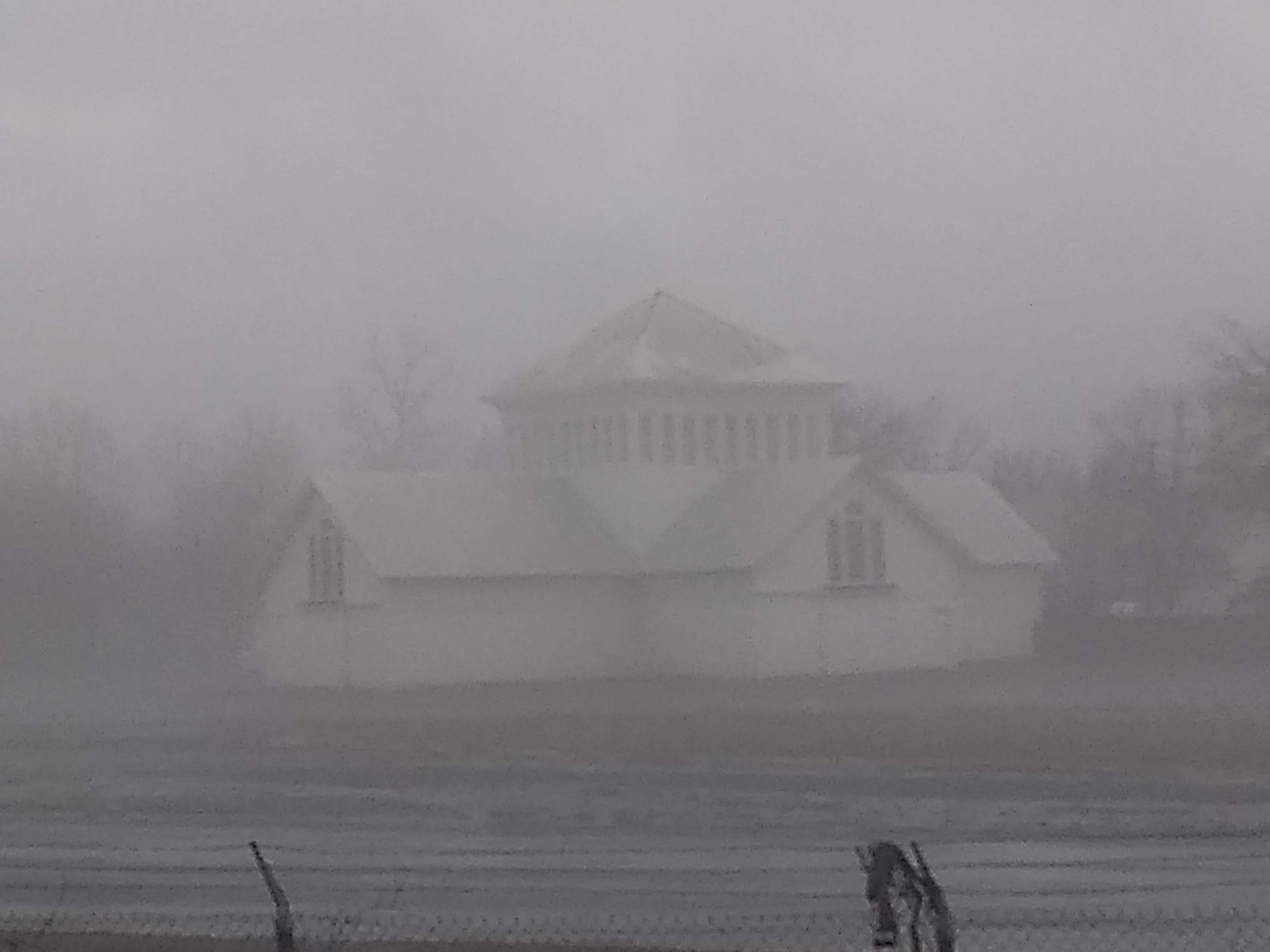
- Altamont, New York's Fine Arts and Flower Building on a foggy day.

- Location within New York Location within the United States
- Location: Altamont Fairgrounds, vic. of Grand St., Village of Altamont, New York
- Coordinates: 42°41′54″N 74°1′46″W
- Area: less than one acre
- Built: 1896
- Architect: Schoonmaker, Hiram
- NRHP reference No.: 03001518
- Added to NRHP: January 28, 2004

The Fine Arts and Flower Building, Altamont Fairground, also known as Exhibition Hall, was built in 1896 as part of the Altamont Fairgrounds in Village of Altamont, New York, near Albany.

The building is the only part of the fairground that remains largely in its original configuration. It is a large one story cruciform building with a large open interior, representative of the architecture typical of agricultural fairgrounds in the late 19th century.

It was listed on the National Register of Historic Places in 2004, having been in continuous use at the fairgrounds since 1896.
