= Clark Robinson Griggs =

American politician (1824–1915)

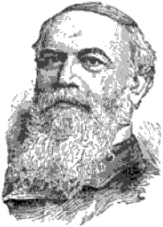

Member of the Illinois House of Representatives
- In office 1867–1868

Mayor of Urbana, Illinois
- In office 1866

Member of the Massachusetts House of Representatives
- In office 1857–1858

Personal details
- Born: March 6, 1824 North Adams, Massachusetts
- Died: December 7, 1915 (aged 91) Brooklyn, New York
- Resting place: Green-Wood Cemetery
- Party: Republican
- Occupation: Businessman, politician

Clark Robinson Griggs (March 6, 1824 – December 7, 1915) was a member of the Illinois House of Representatives and mayor of Urbana, Illinois. Griggs previously served two terms in the Massachusetts House of Representatives before moving to Champaign County, Illinois in 1859. He also enlisted and served as a sutler in the Union Army during the American Civil War.

== Biography ==
Clark Robinson Griggs was born in North Adams, Massachusetts on March 6, 1824. He grew up on a farm in Brimfield, and worked in a shoe and boot factory. He was a member of the Massachusetts House of Representatives from 1857 to 1858.

At the beginning of the Civil War, he attempted to join the 25th Illinois Infantry, but was denied a combat role because of the loss of three fingers on his right hand. He instead became a sutler for the regiment.

After the war, he was elected mayor of Urbana, Illinois in 1866, and was a member of the Illinois House of Representatives from 1867 to 1868.

Griggs was extremely influential in the decision to locate the Illinois Industrial University, which would later become the University of Illinois at Urbana–Champaign. He started with $40,000 appropriated by the Supervisors of Champaign and Urbana Townships and traveled throughout Illinois meeting with elected officials. In a period of five weeks, he had met with 40 Members of the Illinois House, 15 of which pledged their support. Griggs then met with the Governor, Lieutenant Governor, and the Chairmen of the state Democratic and Republican parties. For a period of 3 months after the General Assembly went into session in 1867 Griggs maintained a reception room and suite of parlors and bedrooms at the Leland Hotel in Springfield, where legislators and their constituents were entertained with drinks, light refreshments, or dinners of oyster or quail. Legislators were also supplied with cigars and theater tickets. Griggs further arranged for a special train to take legislators to Champaign-Urbana late in the session. He then ran for Speaker; and after a two-day period of repeated voting, he agreed to drop out of the race in exchange for the Chairmanship of the Committee on Agriculture and Mechanic Arts, the committee that would hear all bills regarding the location of the university, and the right to choose the committee's members. Griggs called the committee to order several times, while privately telling the members not to attend; and when asked why legislation regarding the location of the university was not being heard in the committee, Griggs replied that he had called the committee to order but had been unable to achieve a quorum. Legislation eventually reached the House floor naming Champaign as the site of the new university. Separate motions were made to amend the bill, the first substituting Jacksonville, the second Normal, and the third Lincoln. (Illinois State Normal University, which was nationally admired and would later become Illinois State University, had already been established in Normal 10 years prior—in 1857.) All three motions to amend failed, the measure was approved by the House and Senate; and Governor Richard James Oglesby signed the bill into law three days later.

Griggs was president of the Indiana, Bloomington and Western Railway for three years.

He died at his home in Brooklyn, New York on December 7, 1915, and was buried at Green-Wood Cemetery.

== See also ==
- Clark R. Griggs House
