= Emma Treadwell Thacher Nature Center =

Coordinates: 42.65512°N 74.04232°W

The Emma Treadwell Thacher Nature Center opened in July 2001 and is located near the shore of Thompson's Lake between Thompson's Lake State Park and John Boyd Thacher State Park in New York's Albany County (United States).

== See also ==
- List of New York state parks
