= Hayes House (Altamont, New York) =

Historic house in New York, United States

- U.S. National Register of Historic Places
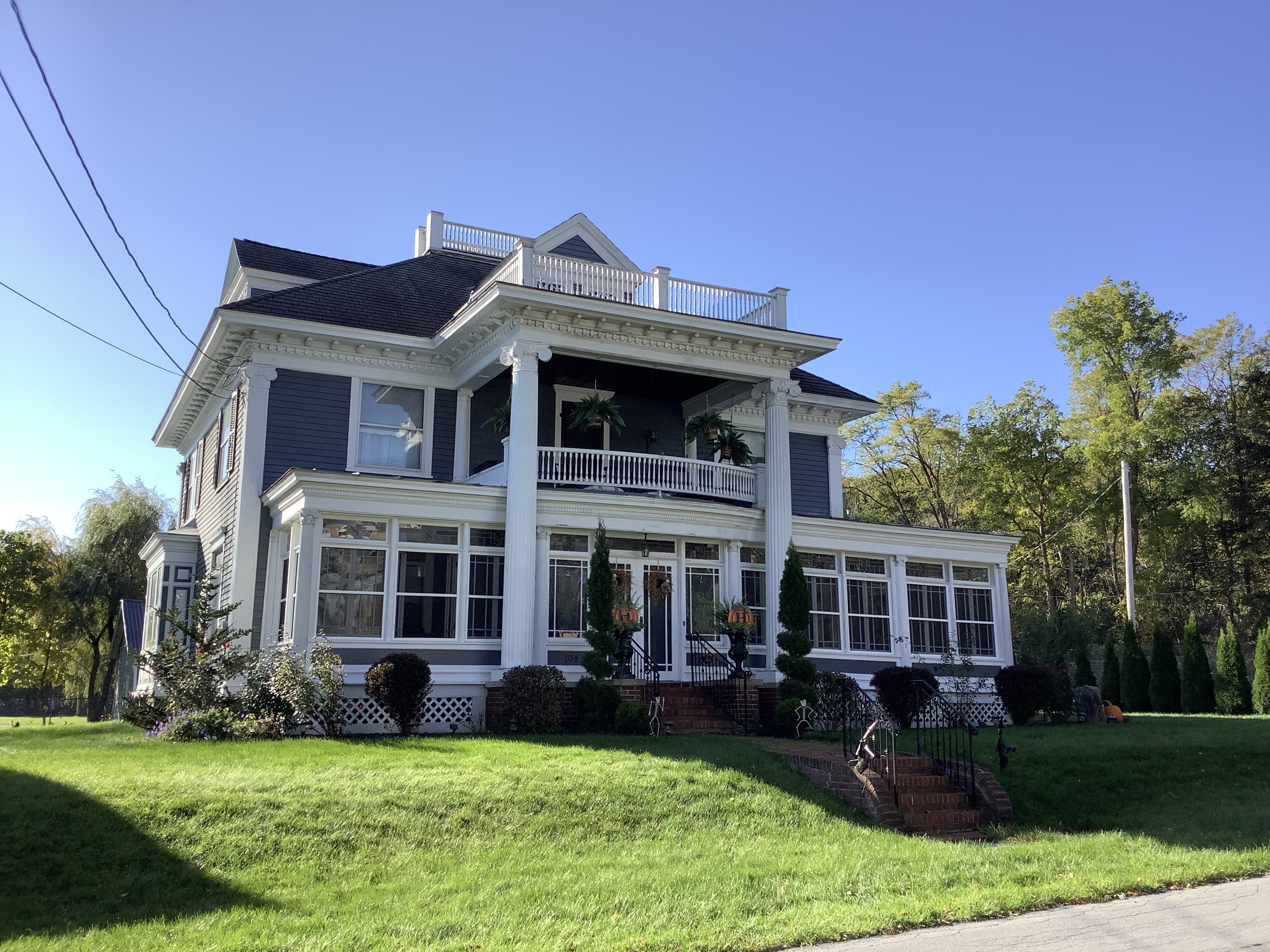

- Location within New York Location within the United States
- Location: 104 Fairview Ave. Altamont, New York
- Coordinates: 42°41′57″N 74°1′52″W
- Area: 1.5 acres (0.61 ha)
- Built: 1910
- NRHP reference No.: 73001157
- Added to NRHP: January 17, 1973

Hayes House is a historic home on Fairview Avenue in Altamont in Albany County, New York. It was built in 1910 and is a large 2 1/2-story, square frame dwelling on a stone foundation. The front facade features an enclosed porch on the first floor and balconies on the second and third. Miles Hayes (1856-1925) commissioned plans for this classical revival house in 1912.

The house was built by carpenter Earl W. Teter for a miller named Miles Hayes (1856-1925) and was preceded on the property by a less impressive house. Hayes had the earlier house moved to another location on his property. The new house's side porch faced his grain mill, and allowed him to oversee operations at the mill. From 1970 to 2003 it was owned by the Altamont Fair, to be maintained as a museum. It is again privately owned. It was listed on the National Register of Historic Places in 1973.
