= Altamont station =

Railway station in Altamont, New York, United States

Altamont
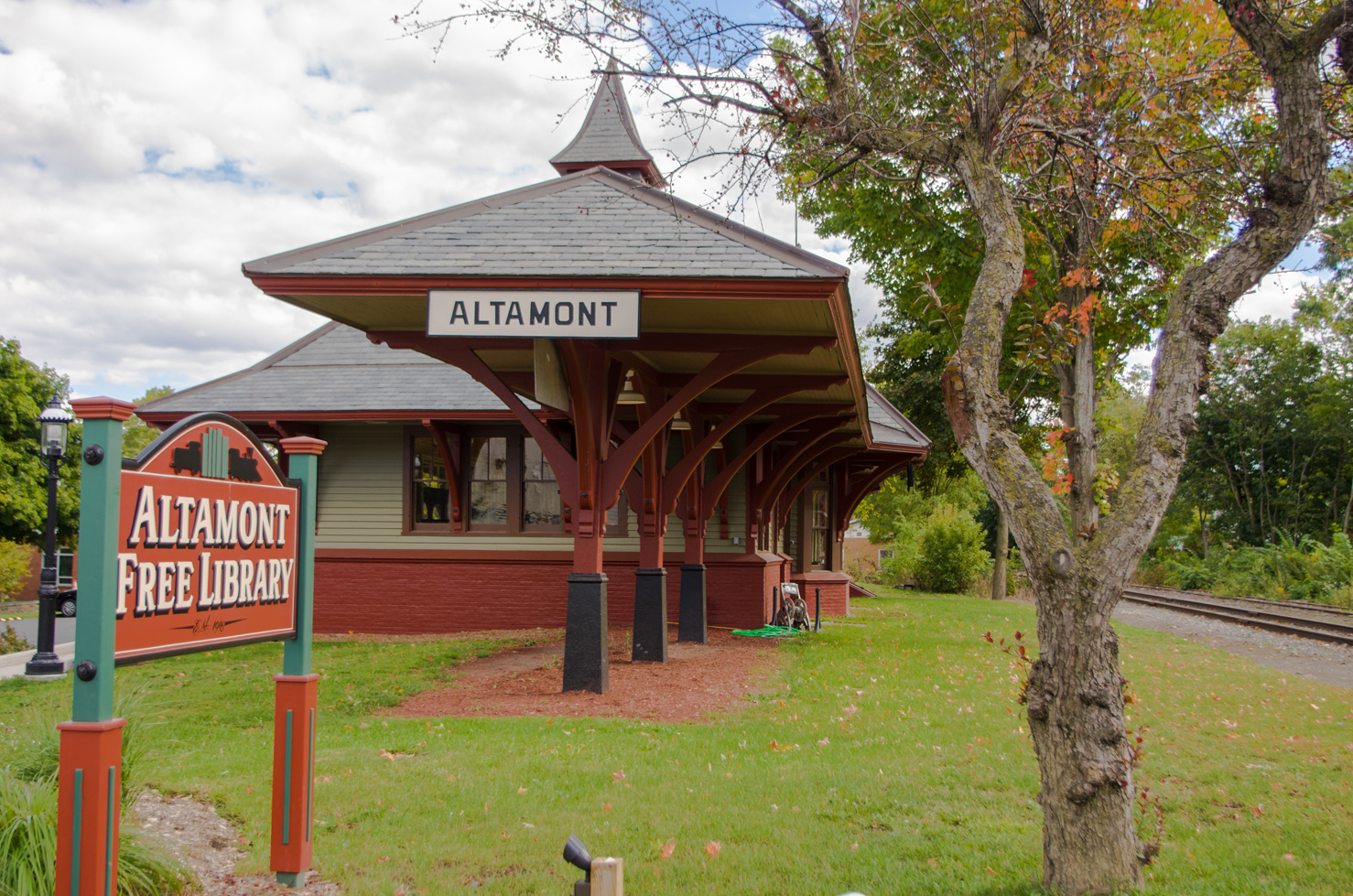
- Altamont station in September 2012.

General information
- Location: Main Street, Altamont, New York

Former services
Preceding station	Delaware and Hudson Railway	Following station
Delanson toward Binghamton	Susquehanna Division	Voorheesville toward Albany
- Delaware and Hudson Railroad Passenger Station
- U.S. National Register of Historic Places
- U.S. Historic district – Contributing property
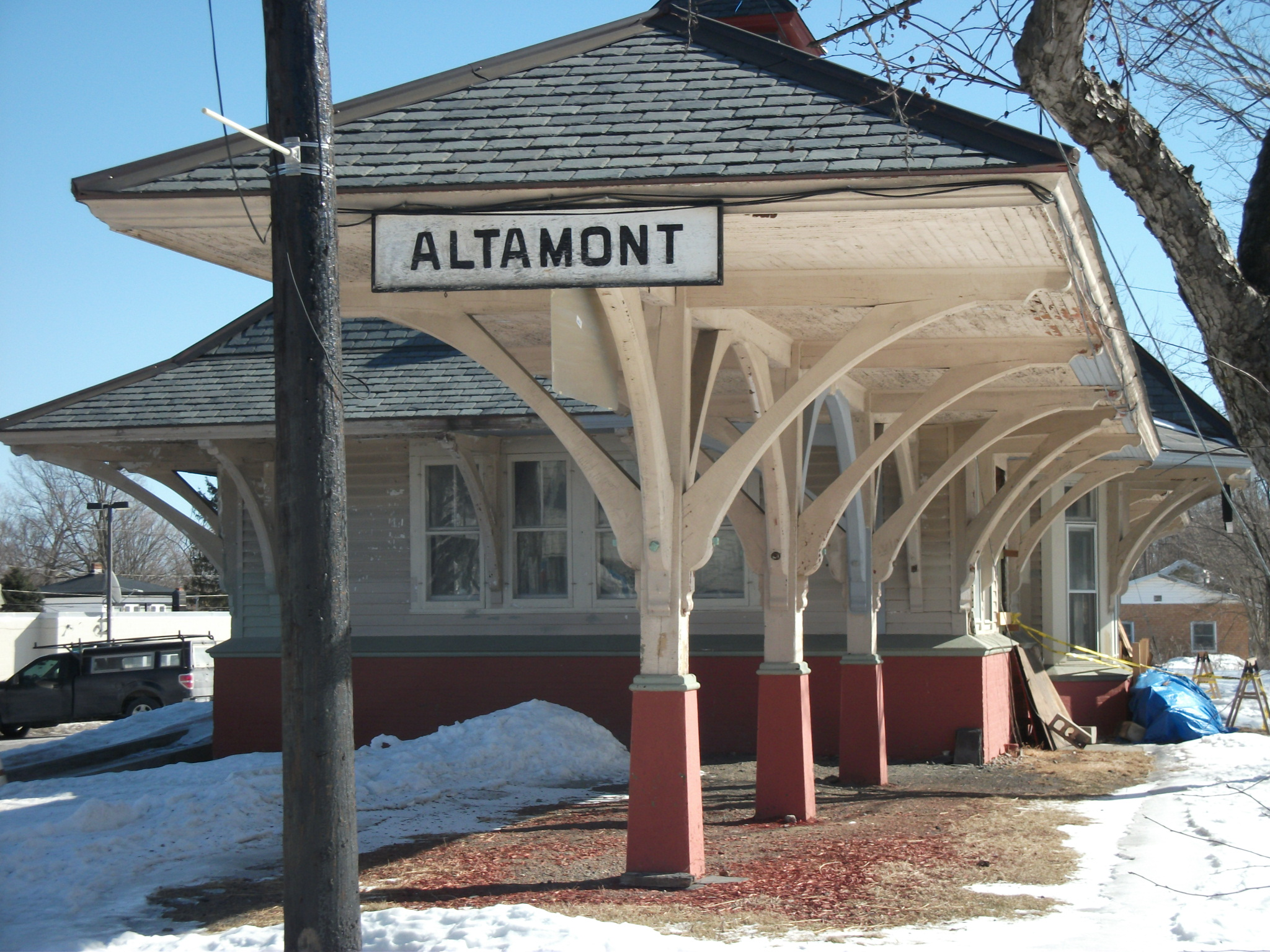
- Altamont station in February 2011

- Location within New York Location within the United States
- Interactive map of Delaware and Hudson Railroad Passenger Station
- Location: Main St. and the Delaware and Hudson RR, Altamont, New York
- Coordinates: 42°42′3″N 74°1′59″W
- Area: 1.5 acres (0.61 ha)
- Built: 1887
- Architect: Delaware & Hudson Railroad
- NRHP reference No.: 71000524
- Added to NRHP: August 12, 1971
Location

The Delaware and Hudson Railroad Passenger Station in Altamont, New York, which has also been known as Altamont Village Hall, is a structure that was built in 1887 by the Delaware and Hudson Railroad. It was listed on the National Register of Historic Places in 1971.

It is a contributing property in the Altamont Historic District, an 11-acre (4.5 ha) historic district in Guilderland, New York. The station has been the headquarters of the Altamont Free Library since August 2012.

== See also ==
- National Register of Historic Places listings in Albany County, New York
