= John Boyd Thacher State Park =

State park in New York, United States

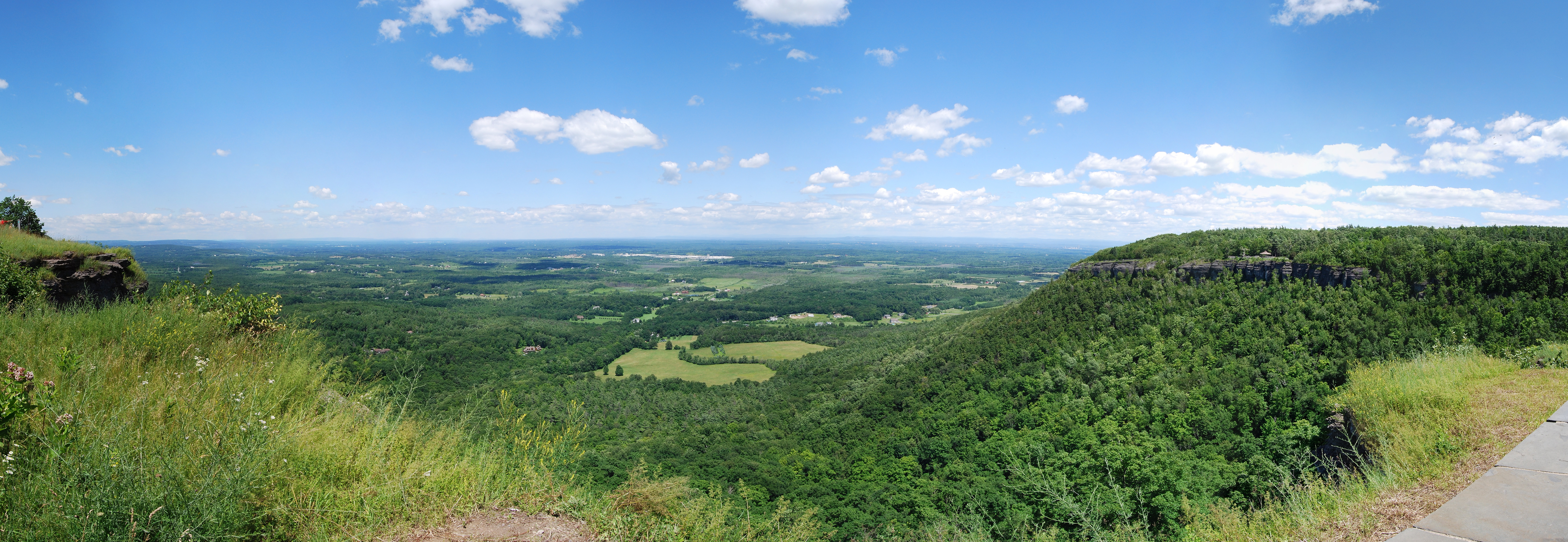
- View from the overlook

- Location within New York
- Type: State Park
- Location: Albany County, New York, United States
- Coordinates: 42°39′21″N 74°01′09″W
- Area: 2,155 acres (872 ha)
- Created: 1914
- Operator: New York State

John Boyd Thacher State Park is a state park located 15 miles (24 km) southwest of Albany, New York, near Voorheesville, in Albany County on State Route 157. Located mostly atop the Helderberg Escarpment, the park has several hiking trails that offer panoramic views of the Green Mountains in Vermont and the Taconic Mountains of the Hudson Valley.

== Description ==
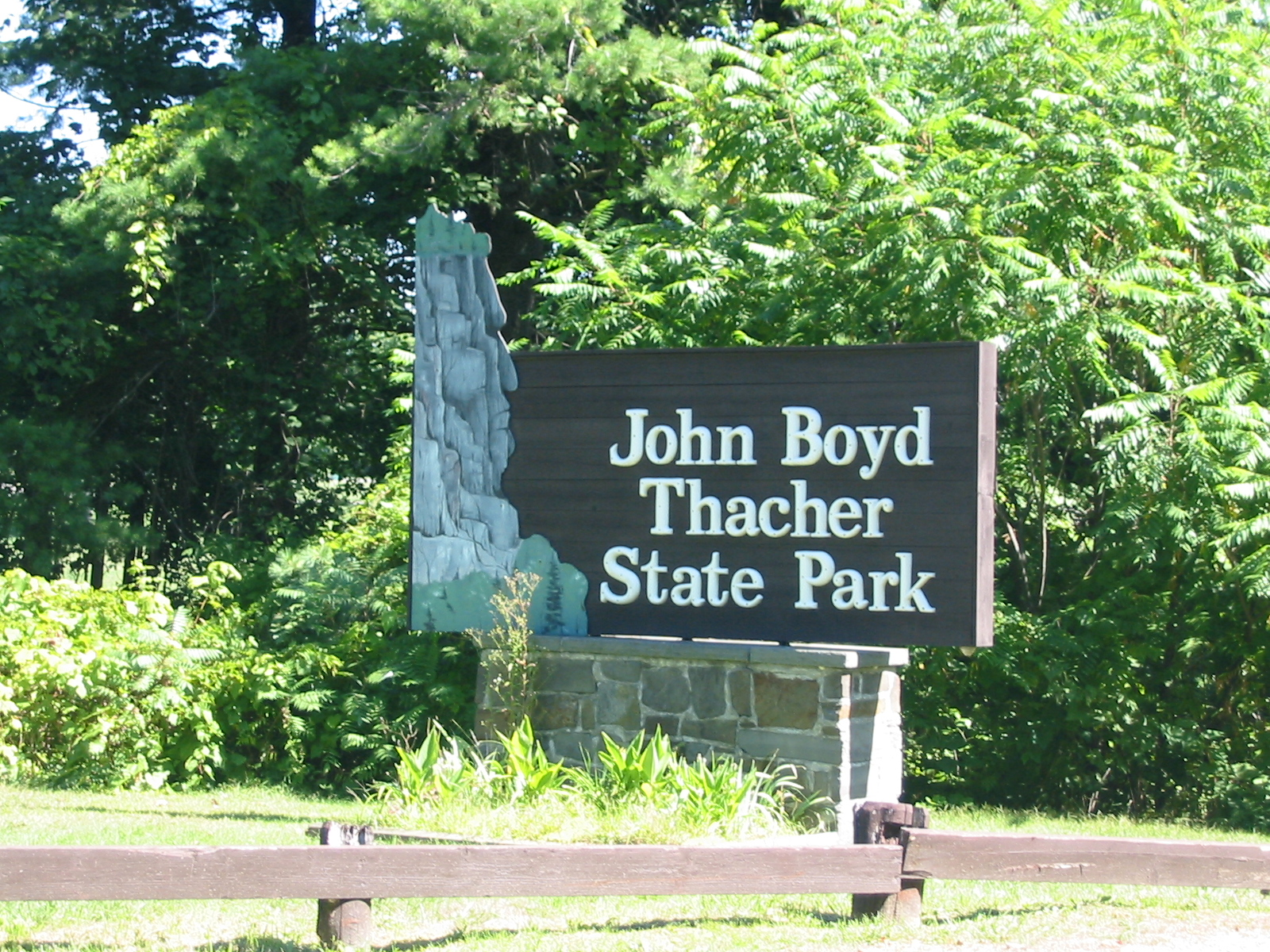
Entrance sign

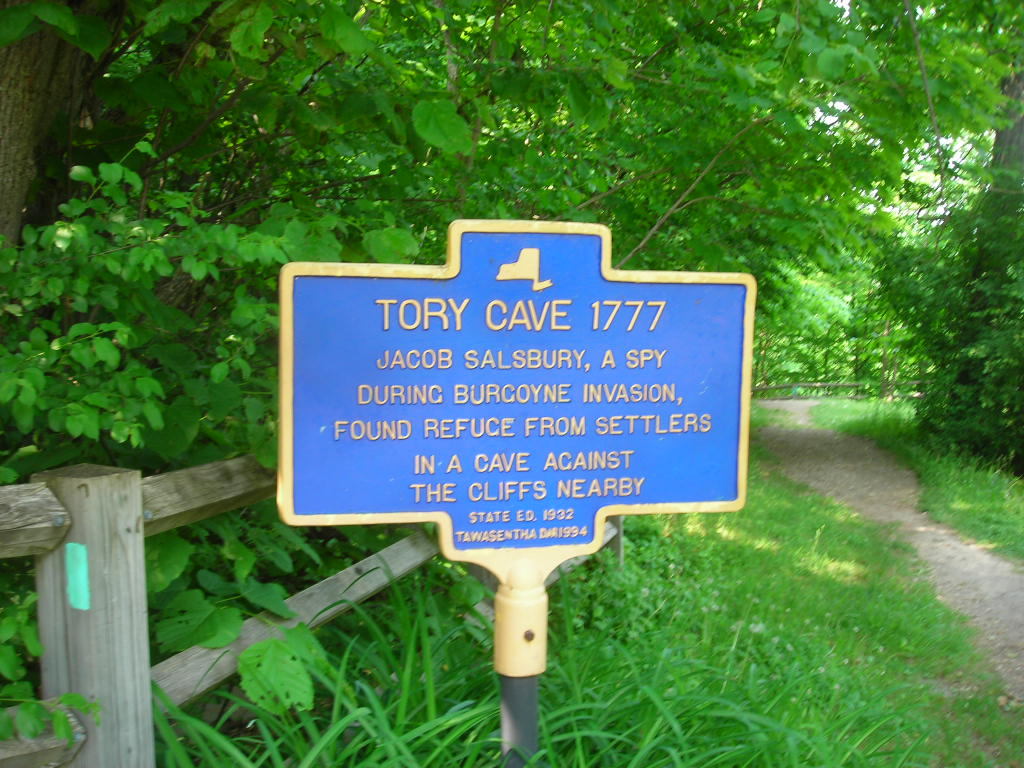
Tory cave sign

The Indian Ladder Trail is open seasonally, from early summer to mid-November, sunrise to sunset, weather permitting. All other trails are open year-round. It is located on the Helderberg Escarpment, one of the most fossiliferous formations in the US. There are over 25 miles (40 km) of trails in the park including the famous Indian Ladder Trail. It contains a visitor center which opened in 2017, a high-ropes course, eight rentable pavilions, volleyball courts, children’s play areas, and numerous barbecue and picnic areas.

Nearby at Thompson's Lake, is the Emma Treadwell Thacher Nature Center, which opened in July 2001 and has permanent and changing displays for the public to view. The center also offers public educational programs, field trips and outreach programs for school groups, and visitor information.

From the top of the escarpment, which reaches 1300 ft (400 m), there are views of the Hudson and Mohawk Valleys as well as panoramas of the Adirondacks and Green Mountains of Vermont.

== History ==
The history of the park area dates back around 400 years to a time when the trail now known as the Indian Ladder Trail was used by the Mohawk Iroquois Indians to reach the trading post run by the Dutch.

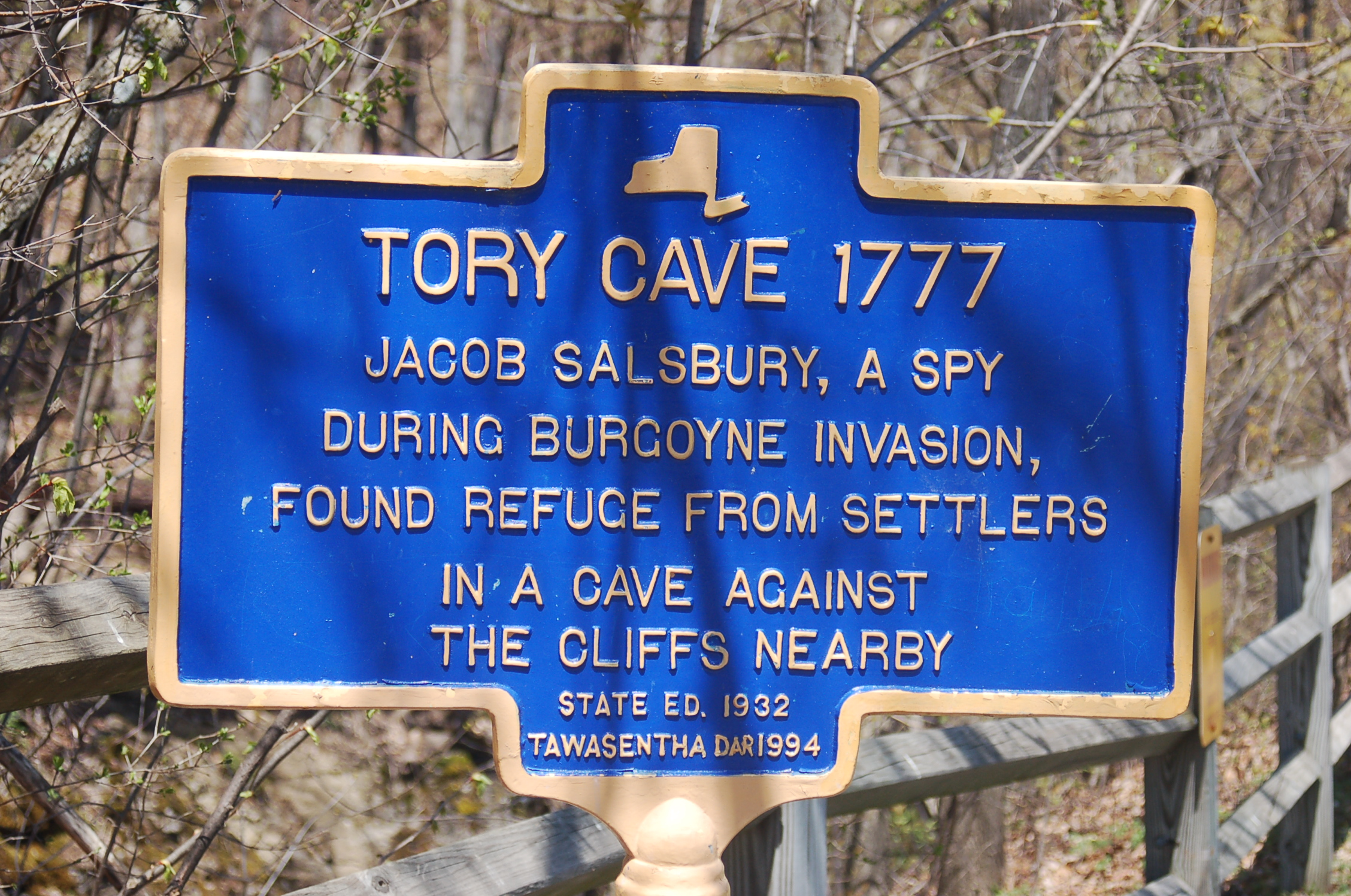
Tory Cave sign

It was here that in 1777, at a spot known as Tory Cave, Jacob Salsbury found refuge from settlers during the Burgoyne Invasion.

The region is very well drained as all surface water runs into the limestone, making it an infertile area for farming. There are some fertile areas along the streams. Dutch settlers were brought in to the region by Patroons to whom they paid heavy rents until they freed themselves of the burden through the so-called Helderberg War (also called the Anti-Rent War) of 1839.

The park is named after Albany mayor John Boyd Thacher whose widow, Emma Treadwell Thacher, donated the land in 1914. Since its opening the area was designated as a State Park. The park soon became popular with the residents of Upstate New York and many amenities were added. The purchase of 500 acres (2 km^{2}) of land in 2004 with a State grant of $750.00 from the Environmental Protection Fund and a donation of land from the Nature Conservancy of 81 acres (320,000 m^{2}) and the further purchase of 188 acres (0.76 km^{2}) on 3 August 2006 took the total area of the park to 2,155 acres (8.72 km^{2}).

It is most likely that the most prominent feature of the park, the Helderberg Escarpment, got its name from the Dutch Helder meaning bright or light and Berg meaning mountain.

=== Park faces closure ===
In early 2010 the Governor of New York, David Paterson, announced that due to the state's massive budget deficit certain areas of the budget would have to be trimmed in order for the state to maintain proper functions. In his budget cuts, Paterson listed the Department of Parks and Recreation as one of the areas that would have funding slashed, which meant that certain parks would either be completely shut down or operated at a minimum capacity.

Upon learning Paterson's intentions, the people and local governments of New York began a collaborative effort to advocate for the budget to be amended to keep John Boyd Thacher State Park, as well as many other parks and historical sites open for the enjoyment of the people. They have used Facebook, Twitter, a website and petitions as tools to help them show their discontent and become more organized in their efforts to stop the park's closure.

Pressure from the public and from some members of the State Legislature resulted in a reversal of the closure proposal. State Senate leaders held a press conference on March 24, 2010 at the capitol, where they said $11.5 million would be restored to the budget to keep parks open.

== Trails ==
There are over 25 miles (40 km) of trails in the park, the most famous trail being the Indian Ladder Trail.

=== Indian Ladder Trail ===
From the visitor center parking lot, the trail descends 60 ft (18 m) to the base of the escarpment via a metal staircase. From here, the trail follows the base of the escarpment passing over small streams exiting from caves in the base of the rocks and under two 100-foot tall waterfalls, Outlet Falls and Minelot Falls. This water is actually from Thompson Lake, some two miles (3 km) away, which makes its way through the porous limestone until it exits here. At the end of the trail, a second set of metal staircases take the visitor back to the top of the escarpment. The trail then continues back to the parking lot, offering panoramaic views.

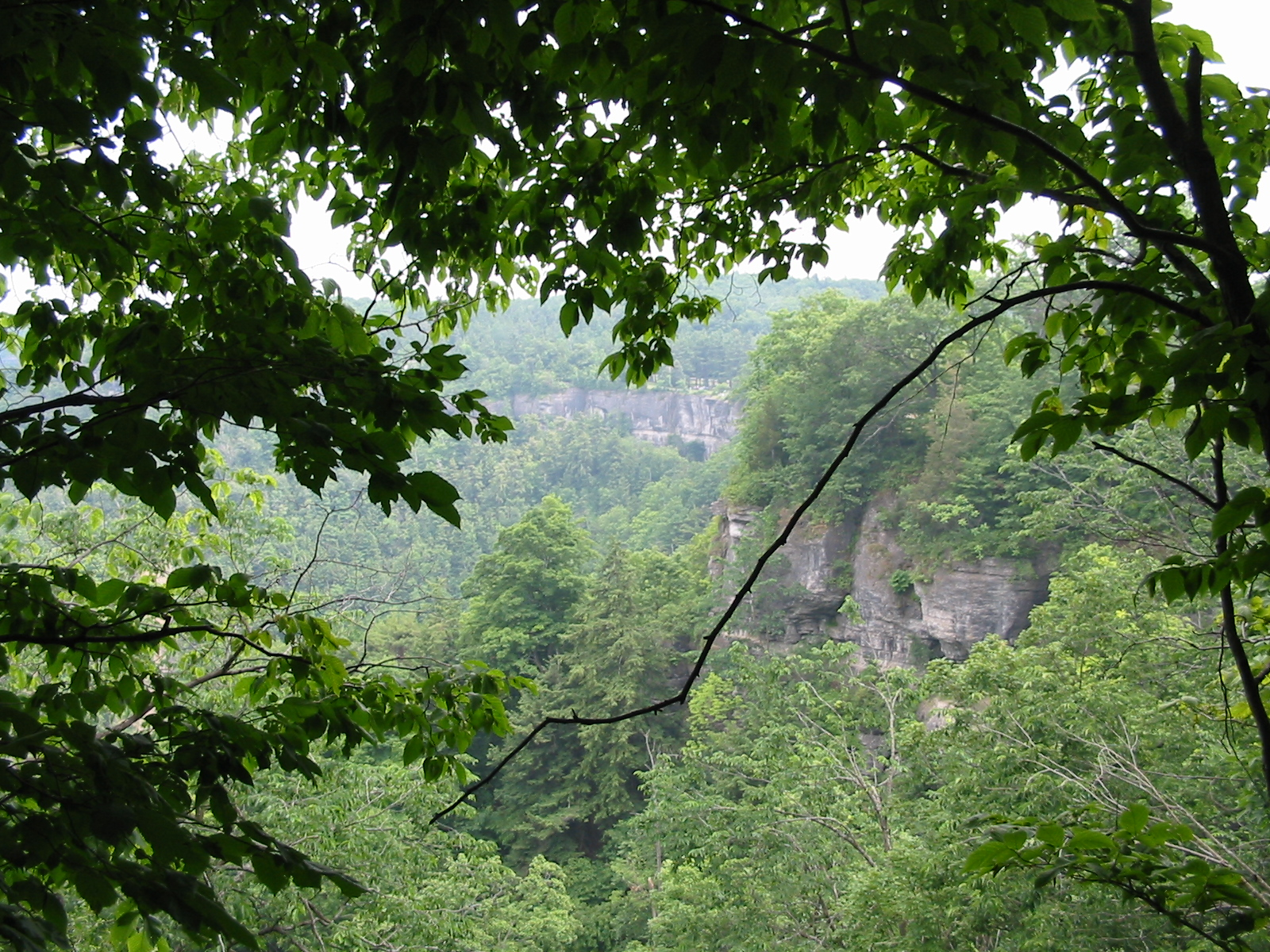
Indian Ladder Trail, view from the path

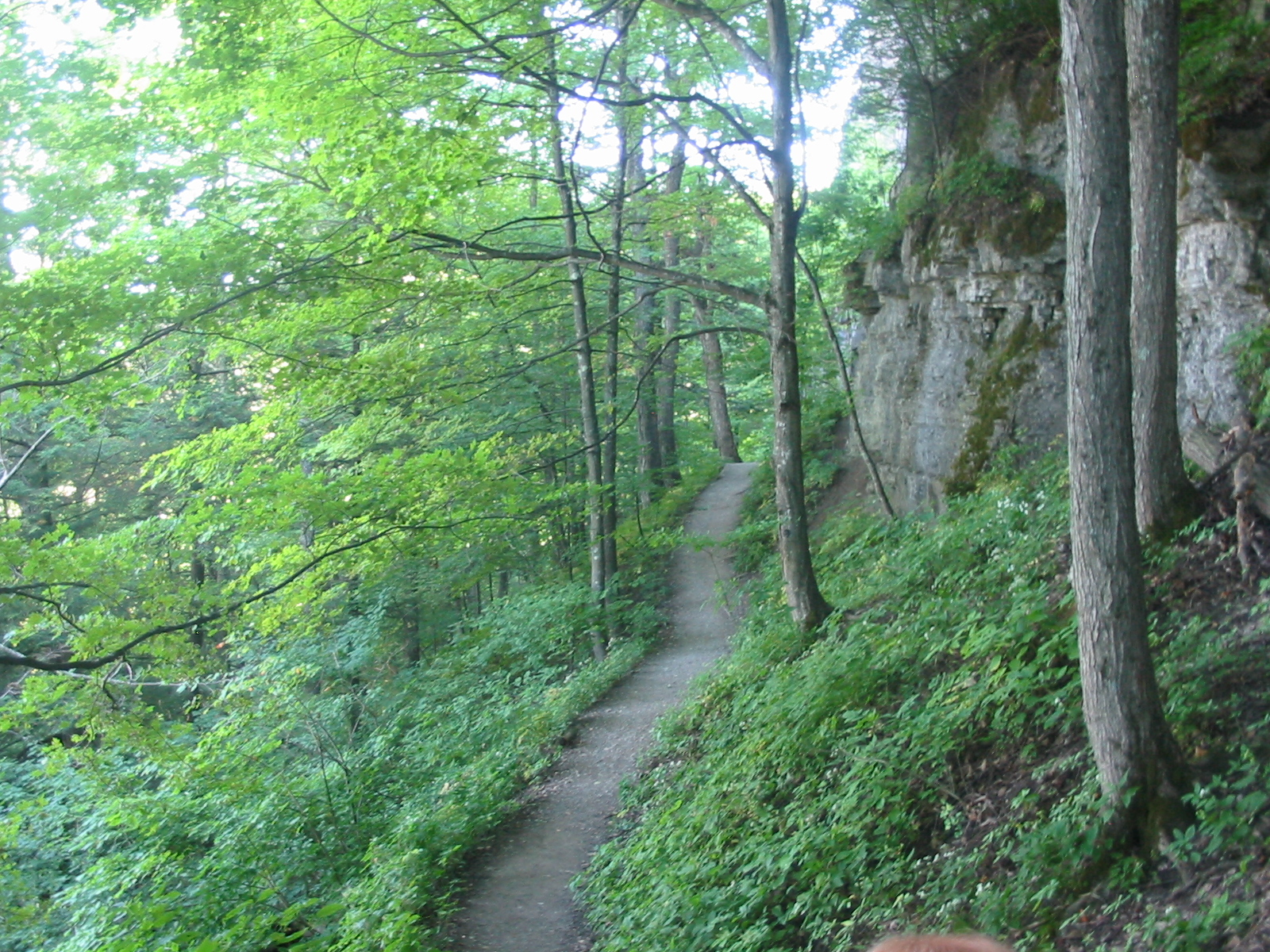
Indian Ladder Trail, the path through the wooded area

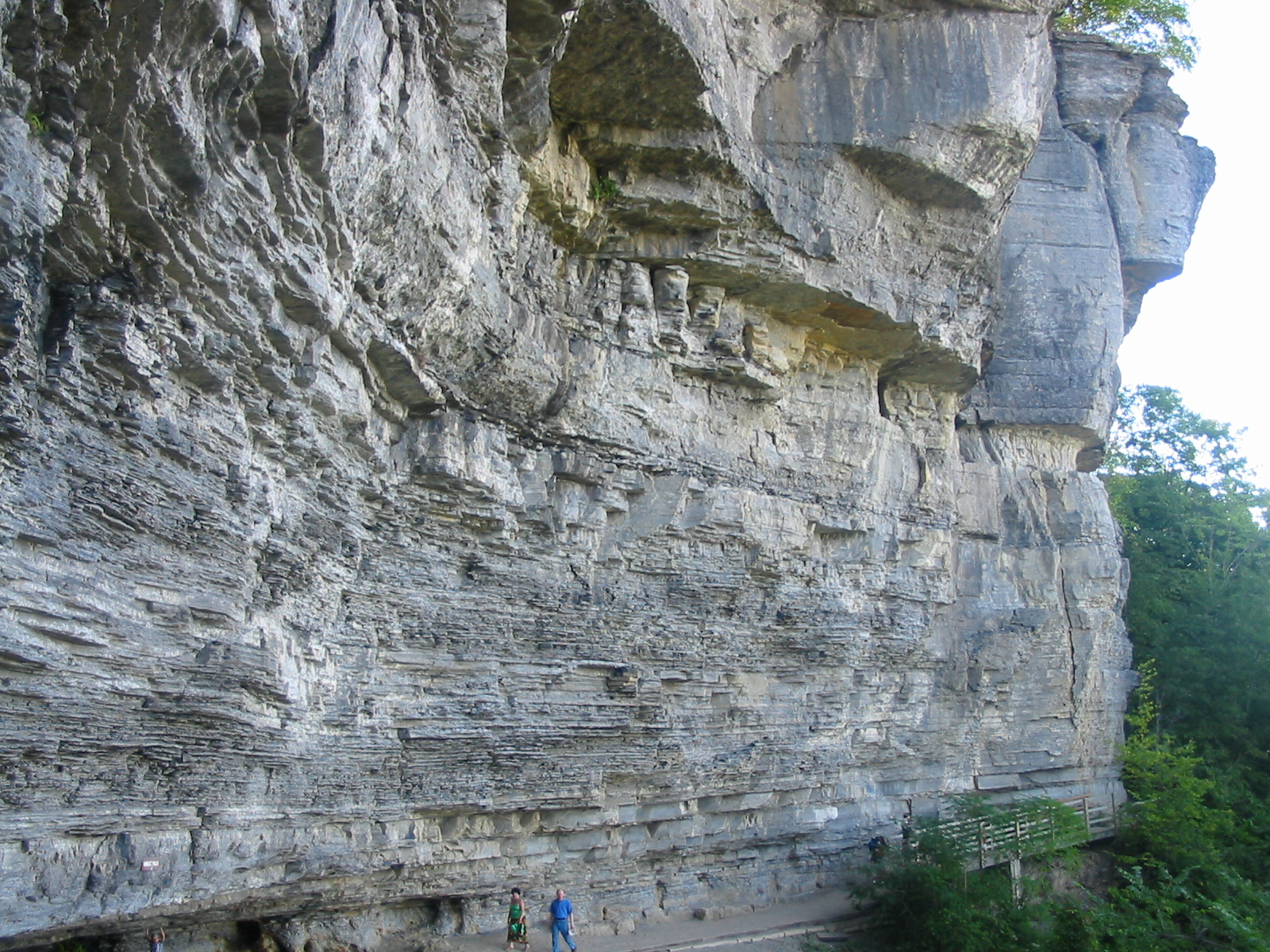
Indian Ladder Trail, base of the cliff

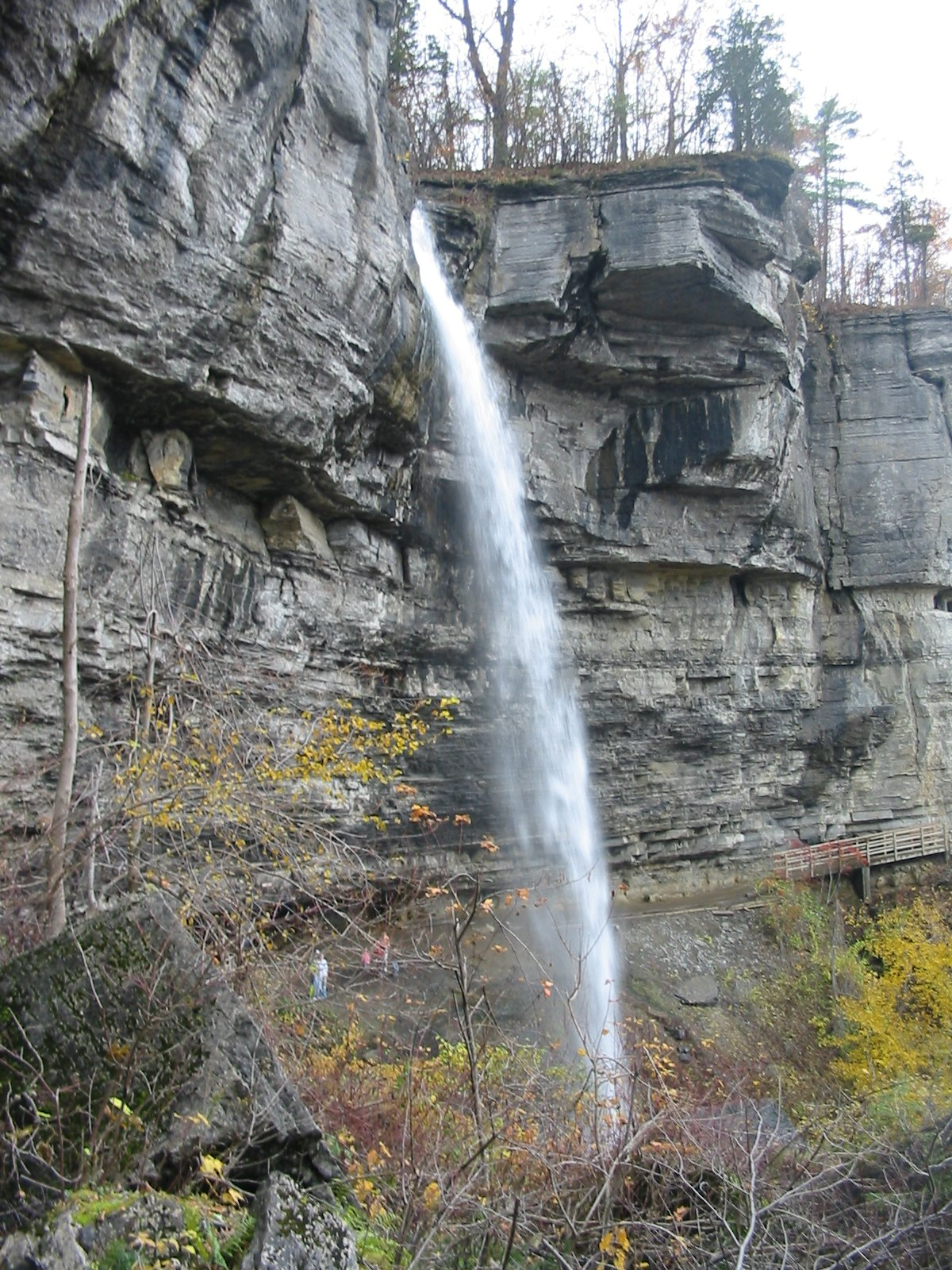
Indian Ladder Trail, Minelot Falls

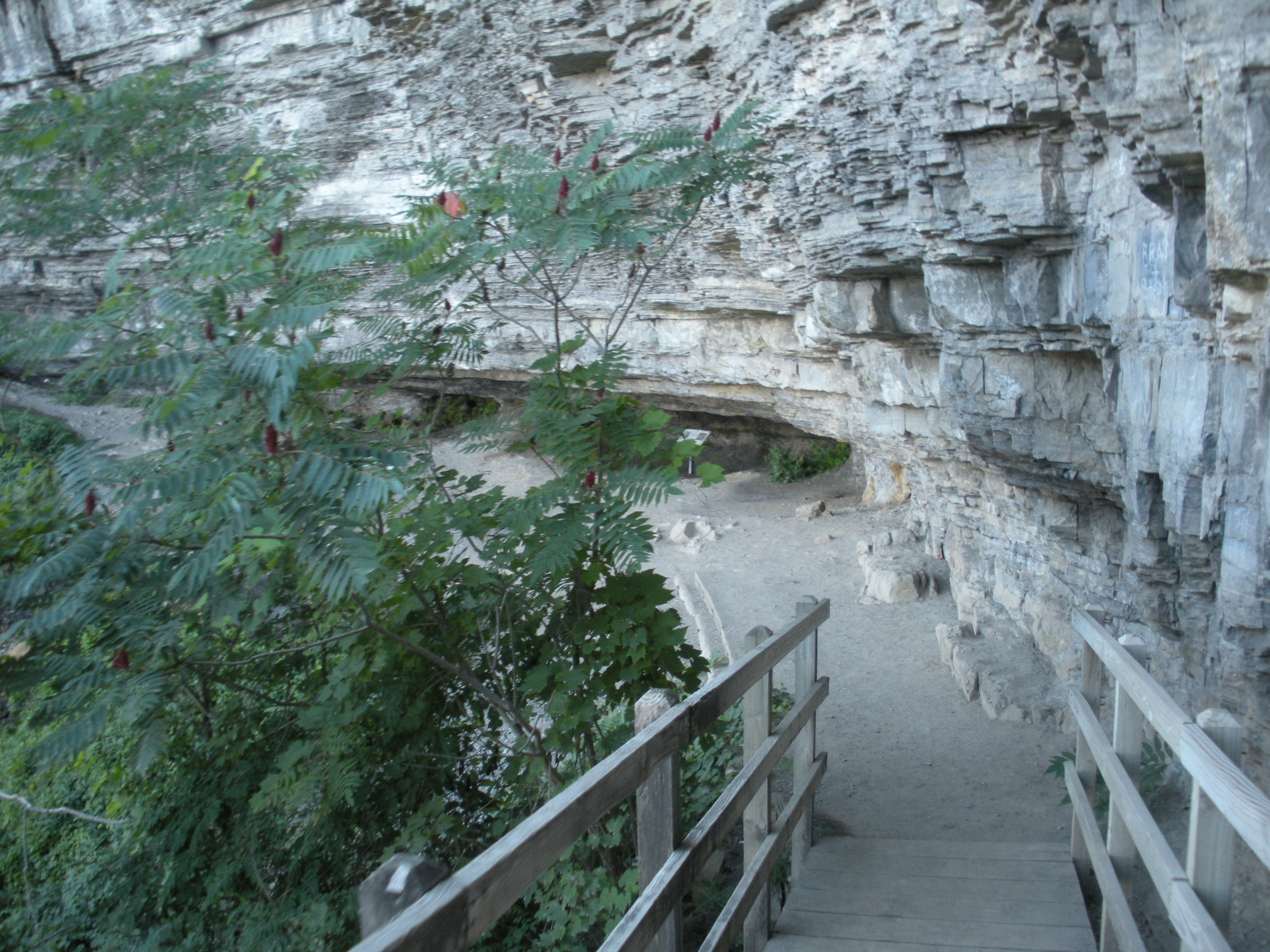
Indian Ladder Trail, from above a staircase leading down over brush

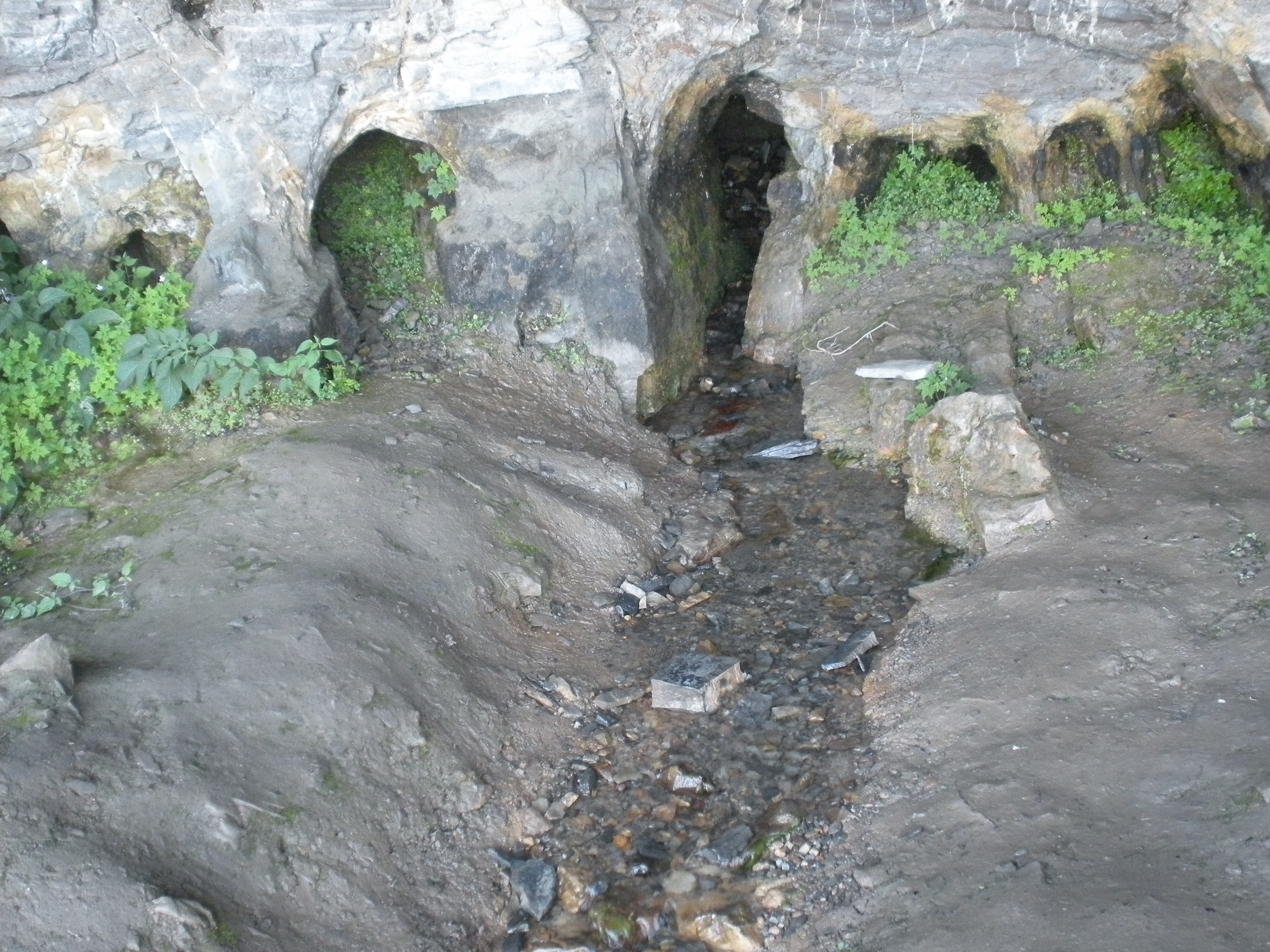
One of several underground springs at the park

=== The Long Path ===
The Long Path proposed by Vincent Schaefer of Schenectady is a long-distance hiking trail begun in the 1960s. The trail runs from the George Washington Bridge in New York City and ends at the village of Altamont just north of Thacher State Park, a distance of 358 miles (576 km). Thacher Park was the previous northern terminus of the Long Path until its extension to the village of Altamont in 2024.

== Natural history ==
The park is designated as a wildlife preserve. There are strict regulations on the non-removal of fossils, rocks, plants, animals and birds from the park. There are also rules on the use of snowmobiles during winter and damage to the park. Breach of the regulations can lead to prosecution.

=== Birds ===
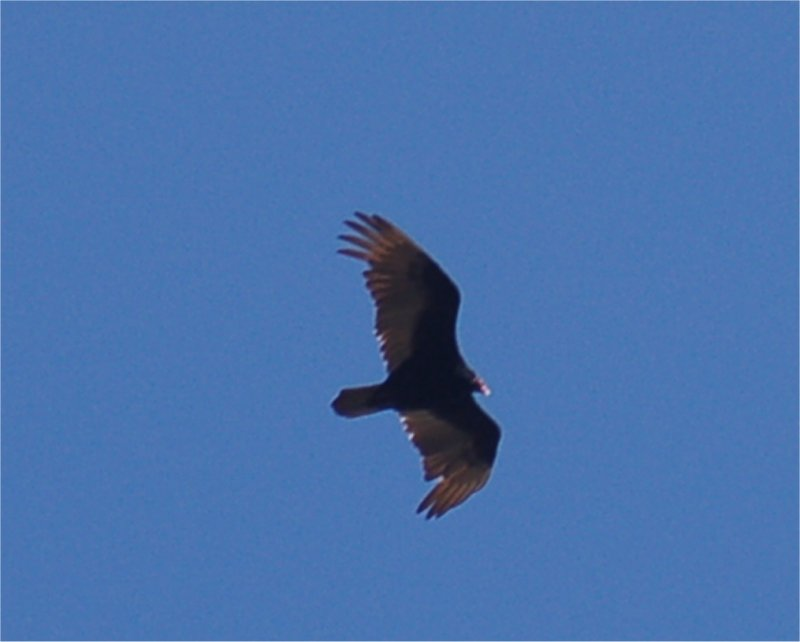
Turkey vulture soaring above the park

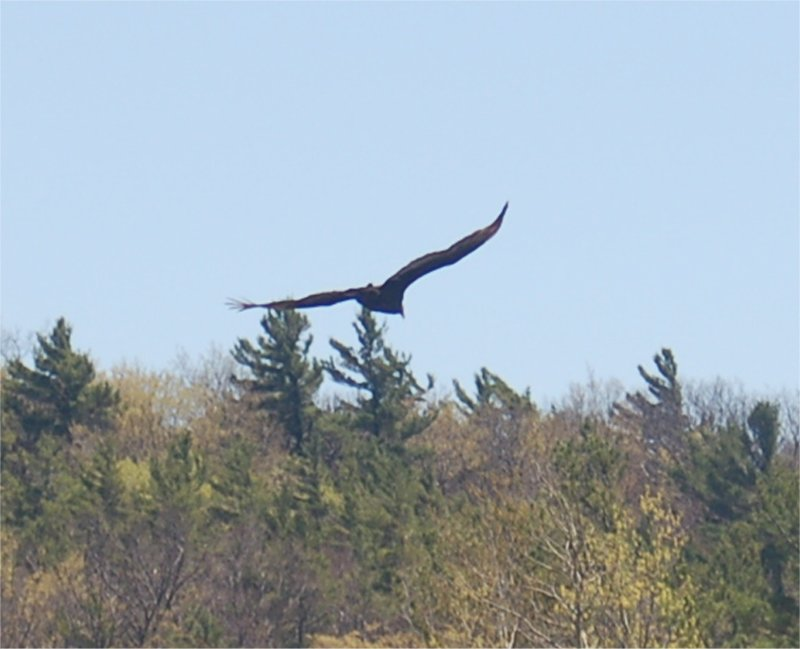
Turkey vulture above the trees at the park

In April 2004, the then New York State Governor George Pataki, announced that 1,800 acres (7.3 km^{2}) of Thacher Park and nearby Thompson Lake were to be turned into a bird conservation area. This conservation area was modelled on the National Audubon Society's Important Bird Areas Program which was signed into law in 1997.

There are some 171 species of bird to be seen in the park, many of which are in the "of concern" status. These include:

- Sharp-shinned hawk (Accipiter striatus)
- Northern goshawk (Accipiter gentilis)
- Eagle
- Golden-winged warbler (Vermivora chrysoptera)
- Cooper's hawk (Accipiter cooperii)
- Hermit thrush (Catharus guttatus)
- Winter wren (Troglodytes hiemalis)
- Black-throated blue warbler (Dendroica caerulescens)
- Black-throated green warbler (Dendroica virens)
- Louisiana (Seiurus motacilla) and northern (Seiurus noveboracensis) waterthrushes
- Canada warbler (Wilsonia canadensis)
- Worm-eating warbler (Helmitheros vermivorus)
- Common raven (Corvus corax)
- Red winged blackbird (Agelaius phoeniceus)

=== Plants ===
There is also a prolific variety of flowers, plants and trees within the park. As the park is a preserve, all species are protected within the park boundaries. The area has some 1,400 acres (5.7 km^{2}) of upland forest with mainly northern hardwoods predominating, but there are also

- Eastern hemlock (Tsuga canadensis)
- Eastern white pine (Pinus strobus)
- Maple
- Basswood (Tilia americana)
- Canadian yew (Taxus canadensis)
- Eastern redcedar (Juniperus virginiana)

There are several habitat types preserved in the park, including 3,700 m of calcareous cliff, bur black oak swamp, red maple swamp and emergent marsh/scrub swamp.

Among flowers that can be seen are

- Flowering dogwood (Cornus florida)
- Rock elm (Ulmus thomasii)
- Snowberry(Symphoricarpos albus)
- Hairy honeysuckle (Lonicera hirsuta)
- Purple virgin's-bower (Clematis occidentalis)

Ferns and their relations are also found in cool damp areas especially along Indian Ladder Trail.

- Walking fern (Asplenium rhizophyllum)
- Purple-stemmed cliff brake (Pellaea atropurpurea)
- Slender rock brake (Cryptogramma stelleri)
- Maidenhair spleenwort (Asplenium trichomanes)
- Wall-rue spleenwort (Asplenium ruta-muraria)

== Geology ==
The Helderberg Plateau comprises a series of limestones of early Devonian age and is one of the most fossiliferous regions in the United States. In the 1800s, some of the world's most renowned pioneering geologists, such as Charles Lyell and Amos Eaton, visited this location due to its robust fossil assemblage. During this time James Hall, New York's first state paleontologist, frequently visited the Helderberg Escarpment, making observations and documenting the unique fossil assemblage. In the 1930s, Winifred Goldring, New York's state paleontologist and the first female state paleontologist in the nation, continued the work of pioneering geologists and in 1933 wrote a guide to Thacher State Park that is still in use to this day.

The escarpment features rocks of the Upper Silurian and Upper and Middle Ordovician ages resting below the Devonian rocks. At the base of the escarpment, the Schenectady beds are visible. The Rondout "waterlime" or dolomite overlies the Schenectady beds and is most pronounced below Minelot Falls. The escarpment consists primarily of the Manlius Formation at the base, which is overlain by the Coeymans Formation. The Manlius Formation contains stromatoporoids and abundant desiccation features, notably prism cracks. The Coeymans Formation is a more massive limestone, appears bluish in color, and contains corals and brachiopods, notably gypidula coeymansensis. The gradational contact between the Manlius and Coeymans Formations represents a transgression, or rise in sea level. Overlying the Coeymans Formation, at the top of the escarpment, the Kalkberg Formation contains brachiopods and crinoids and is interpreted as even deeper marine deposits. The New Scotland Formation contains interbedded shale and sandstone; an exposure is found in Minelot Creek, up creek of the Paint Mine parking area. The Becraft Formation overlies the New Scotland Formation and is a coarse-grained limestone with abundant crinoid debris; it is best exposed in the northern section of the park near Carrick Road, where an unconformity separates the Becraft and overlying Oriskany Sandstone. Due to its predominant limestone bedrock, the park features karst topography which includes numerous disappearing streams, caves, sinkholes, and grikes. The park contains about 40 caves. The longest documented cave is Hailes Cave. This cave has 3,700 feet of mapped passages with about 2 miles of potentially unmapped passages. The park also contains glacial features, which are common to this region, in the form of striated bedrock and glacial erratics.

== See also ==
- List of New York state parks

== General references ==
- Able, K. P. (1996). Birding New York's Hudson-Mohawk Region. Delmar, N.Y.: Hudson-Mohawk Bird Club, Inc.
- Clarke, John M. (March 20, 1914). "The Indian Ladder Reservation". Science. 39 (1003): 418. Bibcode:1914Sci....39..418C. doi:10.1126/science.39.1003.418. ISSN 0036-8075. PMID 17781827.
- New York State Office of Parks. Birds of John Boyd Thacher & Thompson's Lake State Parks. Albany, N.Y.: New York State Office of Parks, Recreation and Historic Preservation.
- Van Driver, Bradford B. (2003) [1985]. Roadside Geology of New York. Missoula: Mountain Press Publishing Company. pp. 176, 185, 208–209. ISBN 0-87842-180-7.
