= Clark R. Griggs House =

Historic house in Illinois, United States

- U.S. National Register of Historic Places
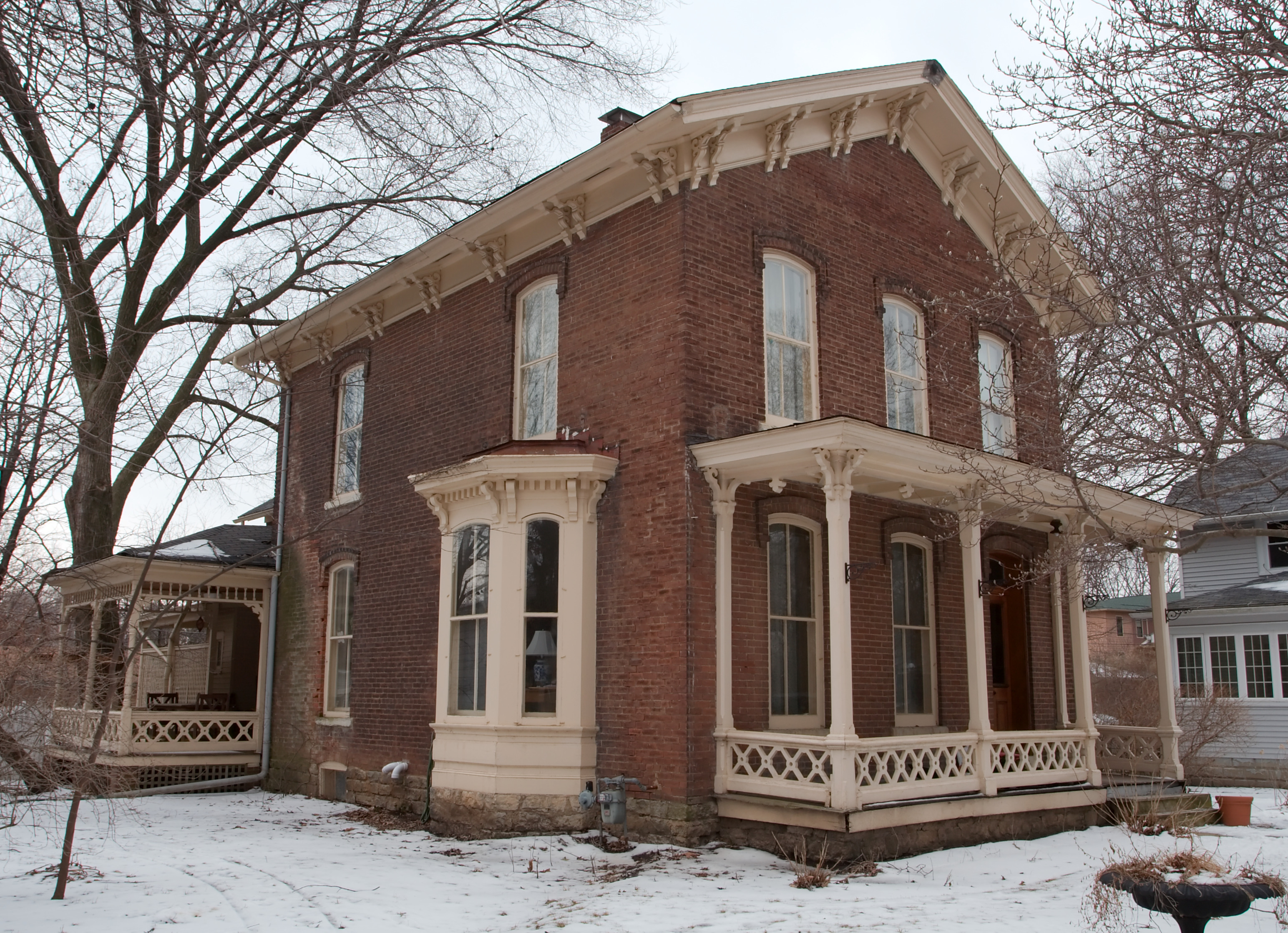

- Location within Illinois Location within the United States
- Location: 505 W. Main St., Urbana, Illinois
- Coordinates: 40°6′48″N 88°12′49″W
- Area: less than one acre
- Built: 1871
- Architectural style: Italianate
- NRHP reference No.: 78001116
- Added to NRHP: November 30, 1978

The Clark R. Griggs House is a historic house located at 505 W. Main St. in Urbana, Illinois. The house was built in 1871 by Clark Robinson Griggs; Griggs was a railroad developer who served as Urbana's mayor and was a key figure in establishing the University of Illinois at Urbana–Champaign in the city. Griggs never lived in the house he built, and his son occupied the house after Griggs moved east. The Italianate house is one of the few examples of the style in Urbana. The house's cornice is decorated with paired brackets, as is a projecting bay on the east side. The front porch has a balustrade and is supported by bracketed columns.

The house was added to the National Register of Historic Places on November 30, 1978.
