= Knox, New York =

- Town
- Seal

- Location in Albany County and the state of New York.
- Coordinates: 42°41′21″N 74°6′10″W
- Country: United States
- State: New York
- County: Albany

Government
  - Type: Town Council
  - Supervisor: Traci J. Delaney (R)
  - Town Council: Members' List: • Dennis Barber (D); • Earl Barcomb (D); • Daniel Hanley D); • Amy Pokorny (D)

Area
  - Total: 41.94 sq mi (108.62 km^{2})
  - Land: 41.76 sq mi (108.16 km^{2})
  - Water: 0.17 sq mi (0.45 km^{2})
- Elevation: 1,230 ft (375 m)

Population (2020)
  - Total: 2,635
- Time zone: UTC-5 (Eastern (EST))
  - Summer (DST): UTC-4 (EDT)
- ZIP Codes: 12107 (Knox); 12009 (Altamont); 12023 (Berne); 12053 (Delanson); 12059 (East Berne); 12157 (Schoharie); 12186 (Voorheesville)
- Area code: 518
- FIPS code: 36-001-40002
- GNIS feature ID: 0979122
- Website: www.knoxny.gov

Knox is a town in Albany County, New York, United States. The population was 2,635 at the 2020 census.

The town is in the northwestern part of Albany County and is west of Albany, the state capital.

== History ==
The Town of Knox was established in 1822 from part of the Town of Berne. During the American Revolution, loyalties of the inhabitants were split, but the issue was resolved when Tories moved away.

The Knox District School No. 5 was listed on the National Register of Historic Places in 2005.

== Geography ==
According to the United States Census Bureau, the town has a total area of 41.9 square miles (109 km^{2}), of which 41.8 square miles (108 km^{2}) is land and 0.1 square miles (0.26 km^{2}) (0.33%) is water.

The western town line is the border of Schoharie County, and the northern town boundary is the border of Schenectady County.

== Demographics ==
Historical population
Census	Pop.	Note	%±
1830	2,189		—
1840	2,143		−2.1%
1850	2,021		−5.7%
1860	2,025		0.2%
1870	1,656		−18.2%
1880	1,694		2.3%
1890	1,411		−16.7%
1900	1,244		−11.8%
1910	1,007		−19.1%
1920	975		−3.2%
1930	863		−11.5%
1940	960		11.2%
1950	1,172		22.1%
1960	1,320		12.6%
1970	1,819		37.8%
1980	2,471		35.8%
1990	2,661		7.7%
2000	2,647		−0.5%
2010	2,692		1.7%
2020	2,635		−2.1%
U.S. Decennial Census

As of the census of 2000, there were 2,647 people, 953 households, and 743 families residing in the town. The population density was 63.4 inhabitants per square mile (24.5/km^{2}). There were 1,041 housing units at an average density of 24.9 per square mile (9.6/km^{2}). The racial makeup of the town was 97.43% White, 0.76% African American, 0.19% Native American, 0.49% Asian, 0.08% Pacific Islander, 0.08% from other races, and 0.98% from two or more races. Hispanic or Latino of any race were 0.30% of the population.

There were 953 households, out of which 39.8% had children under the age of 18 living with them, 65.2% were married couples living together, 8.4% had a female householder with no husband present, and 22.0% were non-families. 16.5% of all households were made up of individuals, and 6.3% had someone living alone who was 65 years of age or older. The average household size was 2.78 and the average family size was 3.13.

In the town, the population was spread out, with 27.8% under the age of 18, 5.1% from 18 to 24, 30.0% from 25 to 44, 28.2% from 45 to 64, and 8.9% who were 65 years of age or older. The median age was 38 years. For every 100 females, there were 100.5 males. For every 100 females age 18 and over, there were 98.1 males.

The median income for a household in the town was $55,658, and the median income for a family was $63,697. Males had a median income of $39,112 versus $30,054 for females. The per capita income for the town was $22,670. About 3.8% of families and 5.4% of the population were below the poverty line, including 6.6% of those under age 18 and 11.0% of those age 65 or over.

== Communities and locations in Knox ==
- East Township – A hamlet in the northeastern part of the town on Route 146.
- Knox (formerly "Knoxville") – The hamlet of Knox is in the southern part of the town, located at the junction of State Route 156 (Berne-Altamont Road) and County Road 252 (Knox Cave Road). Beaverdam Creek flows past the hamlet.
- Peoria – A former community on the southern town boundary.
- Thompson Lake – A lake partly in the southeastern part of the town.
- West Berne – A hamlet at the town line in the southwestern part of the town.
- West Township – A hamlet in the northwestern part of the town on Route 146.
