= Thompson's Lake State Park =

State park in Albany County, New York

- Location within New York
- Type: State park
- Location: 68 Thompsons Lake Road; East Berne, New York
- Coordinates: 42°39′16″N 74°02′54″W
- Area: 308 acres (1.25 km^{2})
- Operator: New York State Office of Parks, Recreation and Historic Preservation
- Visitors: 63,934 (in 2014)
- Open: All year
- Website: Thompson's Lake State Park

Thompson's Lake State Park is a 308-acre (1.25 km^{2}) state park located near East Berne in Albany County, New York.

== Park description ==
Thompson's Lake State Park offers a beach, a playground and playing fields, picnic tables, recreation programs, a nature trail, fishing and ice fishing, a boat launch, a dump station, campground for tents and trailers, cross-country skiing and snowshoeing. Located within the park boundaries is the Knox District School No. 5, listed on the National Register of Historic Places in 2005.

The park is located within the boundaries of John Boyd Thacher State Park and is adjacent to the Emma Treadwell Thacher Nature Center, which park users also have access to.

== See also ==
- List of New York state parks
