= Lainhart Farm Complex and Dutch Barn =

Historic house in New York, United States

- U.S. National Register of Historic Places
- Location within New York Location within the United States
- Location: 6755 Lainhart, Altamont, New York
- Coordinates: 42°43′26″N 74°1′56″W
- Area: 158 acres (64 ha)
- Architectural style: Greek Revival, Colonial
- NRHP reference No.: 01000579
- Added to NRHP: June 8, 2001

Lainhart Farm Complex and Dutch Barn is a historic farm complex and Dutch barn located at Altamont in Albany County, New York. The farm was originally leased from the Dutch settler Stephen Van Rensselaer by Michael Leonhardt who emigrated from Pfaltz, Germany. Michael Leonhardt signed a deed with Van Rennselaer granting Michael "inheritable rights" to the property, which would pass on to his offspring. The cost of the lease was five shillings and a yearly rent of 22 skepples of winter wheat, four "fat fowls," and one day of providing transportation for the Van Rensselaers—with carriage and horses—on the second day of January of each year.

Michael Leonhardt was killed by a falling tree in March 1796 leaving behind three sons and seven daughters and his wife Maria. The tombstone listing Michael's cause of death can be found in the Lainhart cemetery on the property. The farm has remained in the possession of the Lainhart family ever since.

The complex includes the farmhouse (ca. 1851), smoke house (ca. 1851), wagon house (ca. 1851), horse barn, (ca. 1851), Dutch barn (ca. 1819), and family burial ground (ca. 1796). The farmhouse is a two-story, timber framed, gabled "L", Greek Revival style dwelling.

It was listed on the National Register of Historic Places in 2001.

== Gallery ==
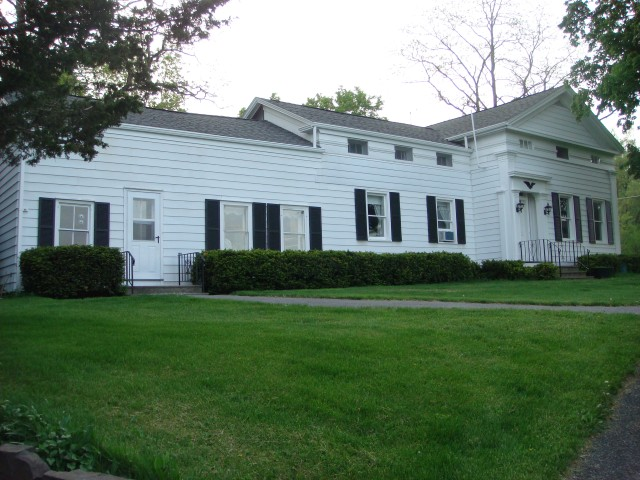
Original farmhouse with successive additions
