= Hiram Griggs House =

Historic house in New York, United States

- U.S. National Register of Historic Places
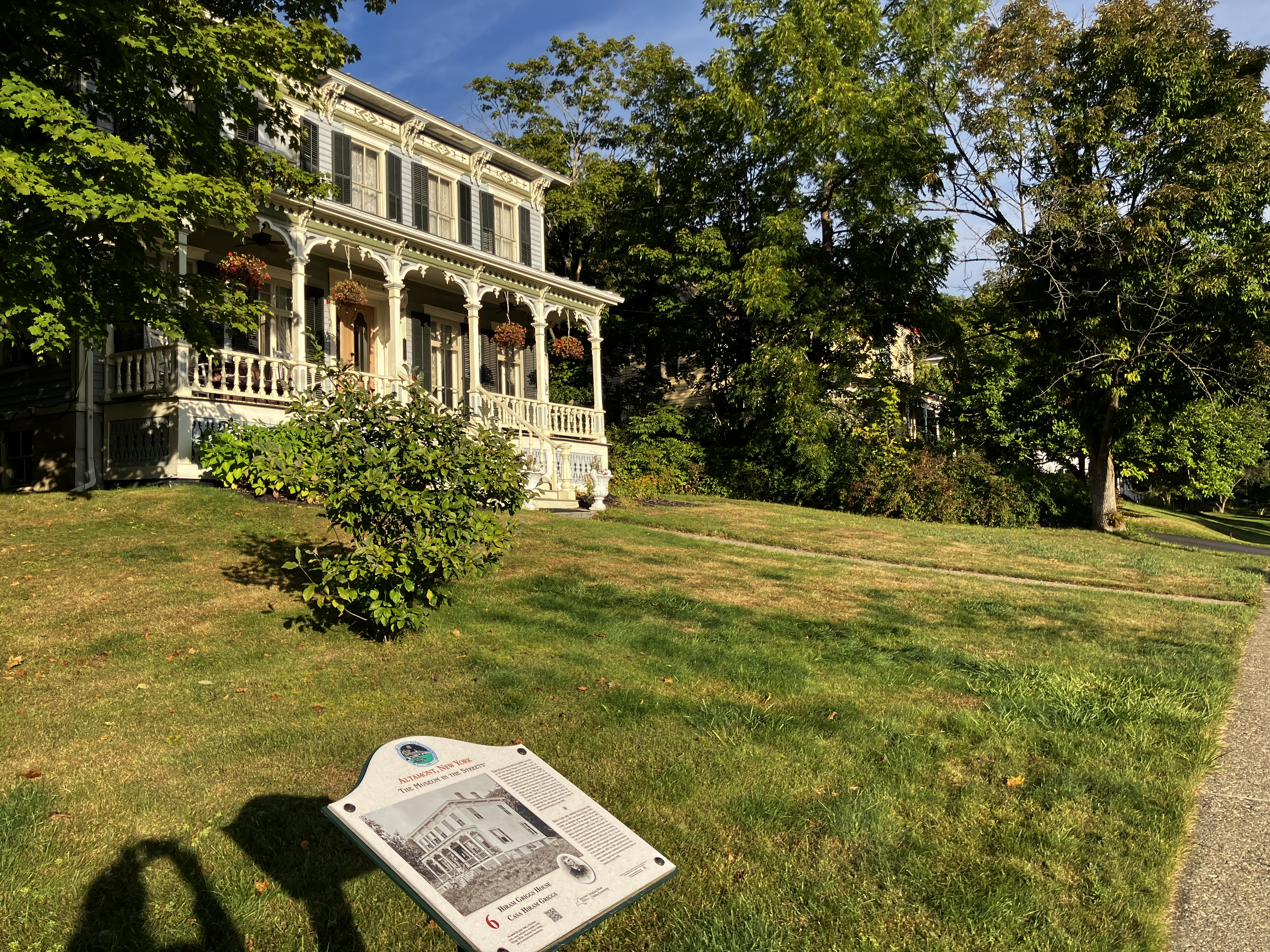
- Hiram Griggs House in 2025

- Location within New York Location within the United States
- Location: 111 Prospect Terrace; Altamont, New York
- Coordinates: 42°42′6″N 74°2′7″W
- Area: .82 acres (0.33 ha)
- Built: 1873
- Architect: Zeh, Robert L.
- Architectural style: Italianate
- NRHP reference No.: 10000483
- Added to NRHP: July 19, 2010

The Hiram Griggs House is a historic house located at 111 Prospect Terrace in the vicinity of Altamont, Albany County, New York.

== Description and history ==
Built in 1873 by Robert L. Zeh, it is a two-story, Italianate-style frame dwelling that is five bays wide and two bays deep, standing on a limestone foundation. It is named for its original owner Hiram Griggs (1836-1909) who is historically significant as the first mayor of the village of Altamont, holding that position for eight consecutive one-year terms.

It was listed on the National Register of Historic Places on July 19, 2010.
