= Altamont, New York =

Altamont
- Village
- Hellerburgh, Knowersville
- Etymology: means high mountain, referring to the Helderberg Escarpment
- Location in Albany County and the state of New York.

- Location of New York in the United States

- Location in New York Altamont (the United States) Altamont (North America)
- Coordinates: 42°42′19″N 74°2′1″W
- Country: United States
- State: New York
- County: Albany
- Town: Guilderland
- Settled: 1790s
- Incorporated: 1890

Government
  - Mayor: William J Smith V

Area
  - Total: 1.27 sq mi (3.28 km^{2})
  - Land: 1.27 sq mi (3.28 km^{2})
  - Water: 0 sq mi (0.00 km^{2})
- Elevation: 451 ft (137 m)

Population (2020)
  - Total: 1,675
  - Density: 1,323/sq mi (510.8/km^{2})
- Time zone: UTC-5 (EST)
  - Summer (DST): UTC-4 (EDT)
- ZIP Code: 12009
- Area code: 518
- FIPS code: 36-01517
- Website: Village website

Altamont is a village in the town of Guilderland in Albany County, New York, United States. The village is in the western part of the town. The population was 1,675 at the 2020 census. The name means "high mountain."

== History ==
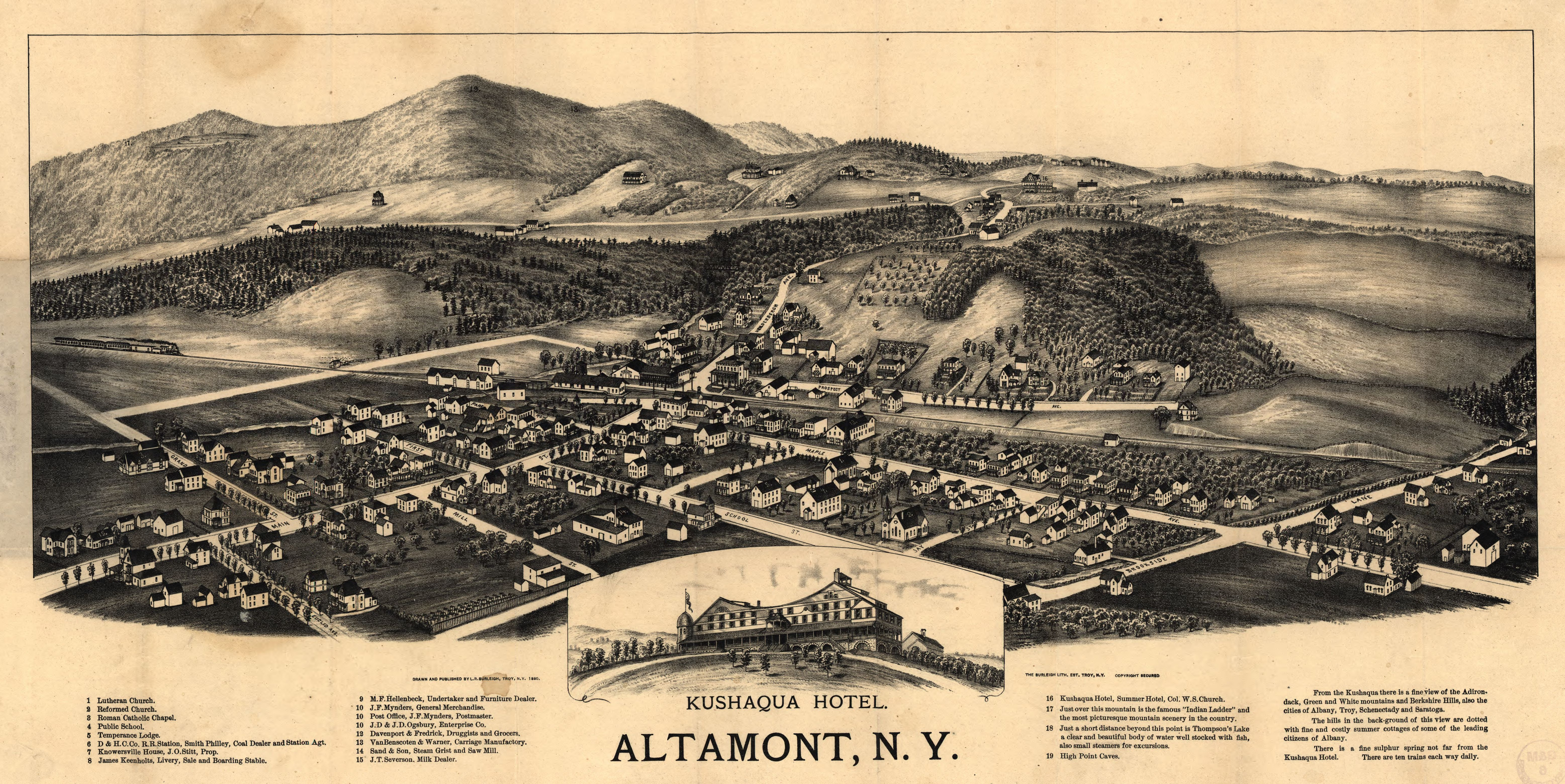
Perspective map of Altamont with list of landmarks published by L.R. Burleigh in 1890

In colonial times, this area was part of the Manor of Rensselaerwyck, granted by the Dutch West India Company to Killian Van Rensselaer in 1630. The area was known as Hellerburgh in the early 18th century. In the early 19th century Knowersville was established in the rural part of Albany County, just below the Helderberg Mountains. This settlement eventually became known as Altamont.

Altamont was a summer vacation spot that was reached by train. The train station that once served this formerly busy whistlestop is now the location of the Altamont Free Library. The old hotel in the town center burned down nearly a century ago. A village fair has been held annually in the local fairgrounds since 1893. The fairground is also the site of other festivals.

The village incorporated in 1890. Hiram Griggs was Altamont's first mayor, and his house was listed on the National Register of Historic Places in 2010. Also on the National Register of Historic Places are the Delaware and Hudson Railroad Passenger Station, Fine Arts and Flower Building Altamont Fairground, Hayes House, and Lainhart Farm Complex and Dutch Barn.

== Geography ==
According to the United States Census Bureau, the village has an area of 1.2 square miles (3.1 km^{2}), all land. Two major streams run through the town center, the Joriohenen and the Ostenraakie.

== Demographics ==
Historical population
| Census | Pop. | Note | %± |
|---|---|---|---|
| 1900 | 689 | | — |
| 1910 | 674 | | −2.2% |
| 1920 | 797 | | 18.2% |
| 1930 | 858 | | 7.7% |
| 1940 | 890 | | 3.7% |
| 1950 | 1,127 | | 26.6% |
| 1960 | 1,365 | | 21.1% |
| 1970 | 1,561 | | 14.4% |
| 1980 | 1,292 | | −17.2% |
| 1990 | 1,519 | | 17.6% |
| 2000 | 1,737 | | 14.4% |
| 2010 | 1,720 | | −1.0% |
| 2020 | 1,675 | | −2.6% |
U.S. Decennial Census

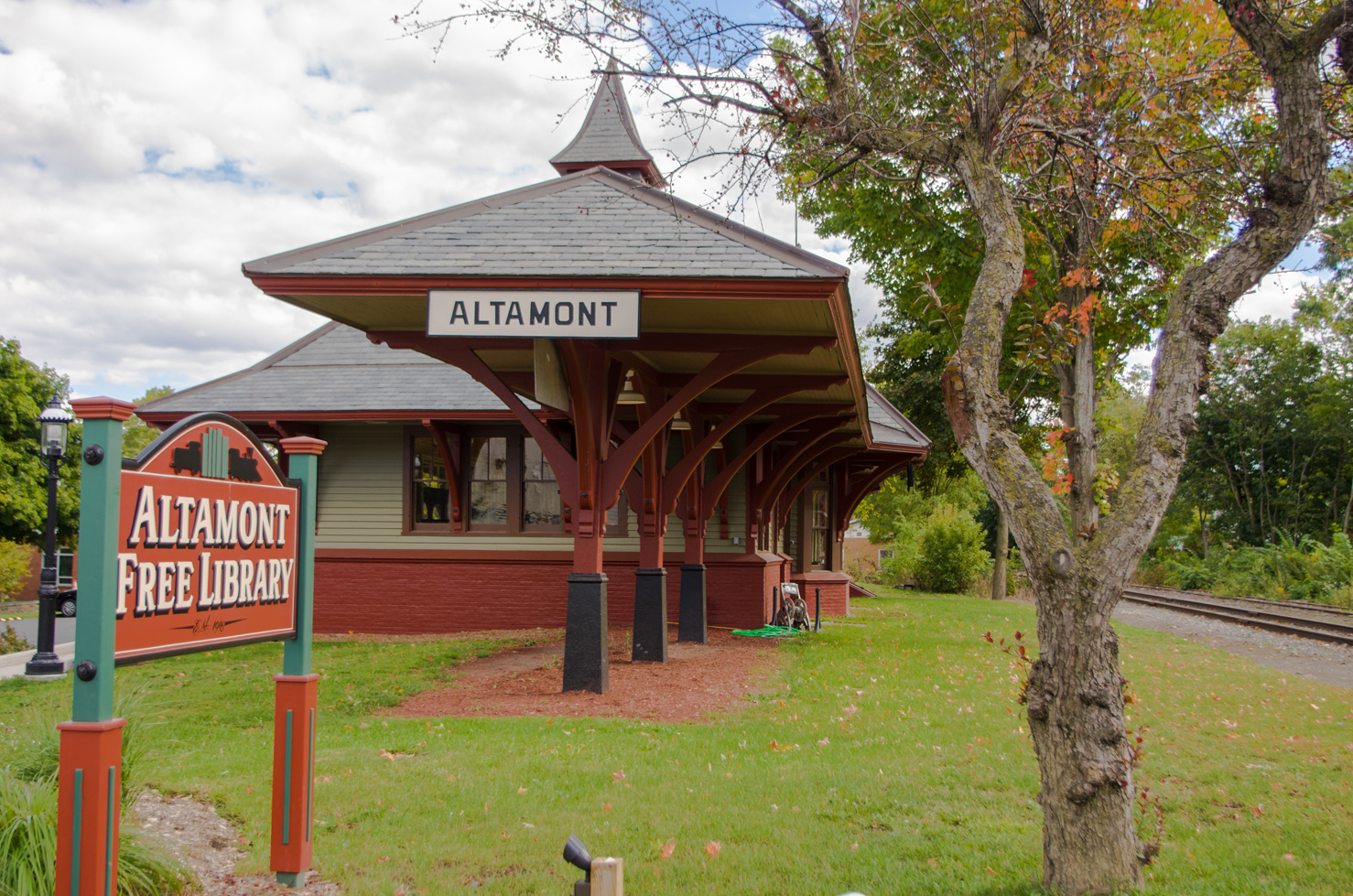
The Delaware and Hudson Railroad Passenger Station is listed on the National Register of Historic Places

As of the census of 2000, there were 1,737 people, 646 households, and 474 families residing in the village. The population density was 1,451.5 inhabitants per square mile (560.4/km^{2}). There were 674 housing units at an average density of 563.2 per square mile (217.5/km^{2}). The racial makeup of the village was 97.64% White, 1.09% African American, 0.12% Asian, 0.06% Pacific Islander, 0.17% from other races, and 0.92% from two or more races. Hispanic or Latino of any race were 1.04% of the population.

There were 646 households, out of which 42.6% had children under the age of 18 living with them, 60.1% were married couples living together, 11.3% had a female householder with no husband present, and 26.5% were non-families. 22.0% of all households were made up of individuals, and 11.6% had someone living alone who was 65 years of age or older. The average household size was 2.66 and the average family size was 3.14.

In the village, the population was spread out, with 30.1% under the age of 18, 5.1% from 18 to 24, 30.2% from 25 to 44, 22.3% from 45 to 64, and 12.4% who were 65 years of age or older. The median age was 38 years. For every 100 females, there were 87.8 males. For every 100 females age 18 and over, there were 87.2 males.

The median income for a household in the village was $52,500, and the median income for a family was $61,750. Males had a median income of $45,865 versus $32,721 for females. The per capita income for the village was $23,232. About 2.7% of families and 4.0% of the population were below the poverty line, including 3.5% of those under age 18 and 5.9% of those age 65 or over.

== Notable people ==
Lee Wallard (1910-1963), American race car driver, winner of the 1951 Indianapolis 500.

== See also ==
- List of incorporated places in New York's Capital District
