= List of school districts in New York's Capital District =

Map of the Capital District

This is a list of school districts in New York's Capital District. School districts in New York are publicly funded and are the most local government bodies in the state; school district budgets are the only budgets that state citizens have a direct impact on: budget votes take place on the third Tuesday in May annually. The Capital District's largest school district is Shenendehowa Central School District, with 9,734 students in the 2013-2014 school year. The smallest district is North Greenbush Common School District, with 19 students in its one-room schoolhouse during the 2013-2014 school year.

== List ==
Note: This list incomplete. You can help expand it!

Click on the double triangles at the top of a column to sort the table by that column.

District	Type	Enrollment (2014)	BOCES	County	School buildings	Image
Albany	City school district	8,272	None	Albany	Albany school buildings: Albany High, Abrookin Vocational-Technical Center, Adult Learning Center, Hackett Middle, Myers Middle, North Albany Academy, Albany School of Humanities (ASH), Arbor Hill Elementary, Delaware Community, Eagle Point Elementary, Giffen Memorial Elementary, Montessori Magnet, New Scotland Elementary, Pine Hills Elementary, Schuyler Achievement Academy, Sheridan Preparatory Academy, Thomas O'Brien Academy of Science and Technology (TOAST)	Albany High School
Argyle	Central school district	554	Washington- Saratoga- Warren- Hamilton- Essex	Washington	Argyle school buildings	
Averill Park	Central school district	3,088	Questar III	Rensselaer	Averill; Park school buildings: Averill Park High, Algonquin Middle, Poestenkill Elementary, Miller Hill Elementary, West Sand Lake Elementary	
Ballston Spa	Central school district	4,203	Washington- Saratoga- Warren- Hamilton- Essex	Saratoga	Ballston Spa school buildings: Ballston Spa High, Ballston Spa Middle, Malta Avenue Elementary, Milton Terrace North Elementary, Milton Terrace South Elementary, Wood Road Elementary	
Berlin	Central school district	722	Questar III	Rensselaer	Berlin school buildings: Berlin Jr/Sr High, Berlin Elementary, Grafton Elementary, Stephentown Elementary	
Berne- Knox- Westerlo	Central school district	855	Capital; Region	Albany, Schoharie	Berne-Knox- Westerlo school buildings: Berne-Knox-Westerlo Secondary School, Berne Elementary	
Bethlehem	Central school district	4,702	Capital; Region	Albany	Bethlehem school buildings: Bethlehem High, Bethlehem Middle, Clarksville Elementary, Eagle Elementary, Elsmere Elementary, Glenmont Elementary, Hamagrael Elementary, Slingerlands Elementary	
Bolton	Central school district	176	Washington- Saratoga- Warren- Hamilton- Essex	Warren	Bolton school buildings	
Brunswick (Brittonkill)	Central school district	1,183	Questar III	Rensselaer	Brunswick school buildings: Tamarac Secondary, Tamarac Elementary	Tamarac Secondary
Burnt Hills- Ballston Lake	Central school district	3,179	Capital; Region	Saratoga, Schenectady	Burnt Hills- Ballston Lake school buildings: Burnt Hills-Ballston Lake High, O'Rouke Middle, Charlton Heights Elementary, Pashley Elementary, Stevens Elementary	
Cairo-Durham	Central school district	1,297	Questar III	Greene	Cairo- Durham school buildings: Cairo-Durham High, Cairo-Durham Middle, Cairo Elementary, Durham Elementary	
Cambridge	Central school district	868	Washington- Saratoga- Warren- Hamilton- Essex	Washington	Cambridge school buildings: Cambridge Jr/Sr High, Cambridge Elementary	
Catskill	Central school district	1,553	Questar III	Greene	Catskill school buildings: Catskill High, Catskill Middle, Catskill Elementary	
Chatham	Central school district	1,160	Questar III	Columbia	Cairo- Durham school buildings: Chatham High, Chatham Middle, Dardess Elementary	
Cobleskill- Richmondville	Central school district	1,827	Capital; Region	Schoharie	Cobleskill- Richmondville school buildings: Cobleskill-Richmondville High, Golding Middle, Radez Elementary, Ryder Elementary	
Cohoes	City school district	1,902	Capital; Region	Albany	Cohoes school buildings: Cohoes High, Page Avenue, Cohoes Middle, Abram Lansing Elementary, Harmony Hill Elementary, Van Schaick Grade	
Corinth	Central school district	1,208	Washington- Saratoga- Warren- Hamilton- Essex	Saratoga	Corinth school buildings: Corinth Central High, Corinth Middle, Corinth Elementary	
Coxsackie- Athens	Central school district	1,405	Questar III	Greene	Coxsackie- Athens school buildings	
Duanesburg	Central school district	770	Capital; Region	Schenectady, Albany, Schoharie	Duanesburg school buildings: Duanesburg Middle/High, Duanesburg Elementary	
East; Greenbush	Central school district	4,133	Questar III	Rensselaer	East; Greenbush school buildings: Columbia High, Goff Middle, Bell Top Elementary, Donald P. Sutherland Elementary, Genet Elementary, Green Meadow Elementary, Red Mill Elementary	
Fort Ann	Central school district	445	Washington- Saratoga- Warren- Hamilton- Essex	Washington	Fort Ann school buildings: Fort Ann High, Fort Ann Elementary	
Fort Edward	Union free school district	517	Washington- Saratoga- Warren- Hamilton- Essex	Washington	Fort Edward school buildings	
Galway	Central school district	927	Washington- Saratoga- Warren- Hamilton- Essex	Saratoga	Galway school buildings: Galway High, Galway Middle, Joseph Henry Elementary	
Germantown	Central school district	560	Questar III	Columbia	Germantown school buildings: Germantown High, Germantown Elementary	
Glens Falls	City school district	2,028	Washington- Saratoga- Warren- Hamilton- Essex	Warren	Glens Falls; School; District: Glens Falls High, Glens Falls Middle, Big Cross Street Elementary, Jackson Heights Elementary, Kensington Road Elementary, Sanford Street Elementary	
Glens Falls	Common school district	183	Washington- Saratoga- Warren- Hamilton- Essex	Warren	Glens Falls; School; District: Abraham Wing	
Granville	Central school district	1106	Washington- Saratoga- Warren- Hamilton- Essex	Washington	Granville; School; District: Granville High, Granville Elementary, Mary J. Tanner School	
Green Island	Union free school district	318	Capital; Region	Albany	Green; Island school buildings: Heatly	
Greenville	Central school district	1,190	Questar III	Greene	Greenville school buildings: Greenville High, Greenville Middle, Ellis Elementary	
Greenwich	Central school district	1,057	Washington- Saratoga- Warren- Hamilton- Essex	Washington	Greenwich; School; District: Greenwich High, Greenwich Middle/Grade	
Guilderland	Central school district	4,925	Capital; Region	Albany	Guilderland school buildings: Guilderland High, Farnsworth Middle, Altamont Elementary, Guilderland Elementary, Lynnwood Elementary, Pine Bush Elementary, Westmere Elementary	
Hoosic Valley	Central school district	1,002	Questar III	Rensselaer	Hoosic; Valley school buildings	
Hoosick Falls	Central school district	1,148	Questar III	Rensselaer	Hoosick; Falls school buildings: Hoosick Falls Jr./Sr. High, Hoosick Falls Elementary	
Hudson	City school district	1,817	Questar III	Columbia	Hudson school buildings: Hudson High, Alternate Learning Program, Hudson Jr. High, Smith Intermediate, Edwards Primary	
Kinderhook	Central school district	1,857	Questar III	Columbia	Kinderhook school buildings: Ichabod Crane High, Ichabod Crane Middle, Glynn Elementary, Martin Van Buren Elementary, Ichabod Crane Primary	
Lansingburgh	Central school district	2,327	Questar III	Rensselaer	Lansingburgh school buildings: Lansingburgh High, Knickerbacker Middle, Rensselaer Park Elementary, Turnpike Elementary	
Mechanicville	City school district		Washington- Saratoga- Hamilton- Warren- Essex	Saratoga	Mechanicville school buildings: Mechanicville Public School District Campus (one building, separate wings for junior/high and elementary schools)	
Menands	Union free school district	259	Capital; Region	Albany	Menands school buildings: Menands School	
Middleburgh	Central school district	784	Capital; Region	Schoharie	Middleburgh school buildings: Middleburgh High, Middleburgh Middle, Middleburgh Elementary	
Mohonasen	Central school district	2,847	Capital; Region	Schenectady, Albany	Mohonasen school buildings: Mohonasen High, Draper Middle, Bradt Primary, Pinewood Intermediate	
New Lebanon	Central school district	422	Questar III	Columbia	New Lebanon school buildings: New Lebanon Jr.-Sr. High, Howard Elementary	
Niskayuna	Central school district	4,085	Capital; Region	Schenectady, Albany, Saratoga	Niskayuna school buildings: Niskayuna High, Iroquois Middle, Van Antwerp Middle, Birchwood Elementary, Craig Elementary, Glencliff Elementary, Hillside Elementary, Rosendale Elementary	
North Colonie	Central school district	5,347	Capital; Region	Albany	North; Colonie school buildings: Shaker High, Shaker Junior High, Blue Creek Elementary, Boght Hills Elementary, Forts Ferry Elementary, Latham Ridge Elementary, Loudonville Elementary, Maplewood Elementary, Southgate Elementary	
North; Greenbush	Common school district	19	Questar III	Rensselaer	North; Greenbush school buildings: North Greenbush	
Ravena- Coeymans- Selkirk	Central school district	1,872	Capital; Region	Albany, Greene	Ravena- Coeymans- Selkirk school buildings: Ravena-Coeymans-Selkirk High, Ravena-Coeymans-Selkirk Middle, AW Becker Elementary, Pieter B. Coeymans Elementary	
Rensselaer	City school district	1,036	Questar III	Rensselaer	Rensselaer school buildings: Rensselaer City School District Campus (one building, separate wings for high, middle, and elementary schools)	Rensselaer City School District
Saratoga; Springs	City school district	6,442	Washington- Saratoga- Warren- Hamilton- Essex	Saratoga	Saratoga Springs school buildings: Saratoga Springs High, Maple Avenue Middle, Caroline Street Elementary, Division Street Elementary, Dorothy Nolan Elementary, Geyser Road Elementary, Greenfield Elementary, Lake Avenue Elementary	
Schalmont	Central school district	1,840	Capital; Region	Schenectady, Albany, Montgomery	Schalmont school buildings: Schalmont, Schalmont Middle, Jefferson Elementary, Mariaville Elementary, Woestina Elementary	
Schenectady	City school district	9,557	Capital; Region	Schenectady	Schenectady school buildings: Schenectady High, Washington Irving Adult and Continuing Education Center, Career Center at Steinmetz, Mont Pleasant Middle, Oneida Middle, ACC at Pleasant Valley, Central Park Magnet, Elmer Avenue Elementary, Roosevelt Elementary, Fulton Early Childhood Education Center, Hamilton Elementary, Howe Early Childhood Education Center, Blodgett Elementary, Lincoln Elementary, ML King Magnet, Paige Elementary, Van Corlear Elementary, Woodlawn Elementary, Yates Magnet, Zoller Elementary	
Schodack	Central school district	921	Questar III	Rensselaer	Schodack school buildings: Maple Hill High, Maple Hill Middle, Castleton Elementary	
Schoharie	Central school district	823	Capital; Region	Schoharie	Schoharie school buildings: Schoharie Jr/Sr High, Schoharie Elementary	
Scotia- Glenville	Central school district	2,527	Capital; Region	Schenectady	Scotia- Glenville school buildings: Scotia-Glenville High, Scotia-Glenville Middle, Glendaal Elementary, Glen-Worden Elementary, Lincoln Elementary, Sacandaga Elementary	
Sharon Springs	Central school district	273	Capital; Region	Schoharie	Sharon; Springs school buildings: Sharon Springs Central	
Shenendehowa	Central school district	9,734	Capital; Region	Saratoga	Shenendehowa school buildings: Shenendehowa High (East and West buildings), Shenendehowa Middle (one building including three schools- Acadia Middle, Gowana Middle, Koda Middle), Arongen Elementary, Chango Elementary, Karigon Elementary, Okte Elementary, Shatekon Elementary, Skano Elementary, Tesango Elementary	
South Colonie	Central school district	4,861	Capital; Region	Albany	South; Colonie school buildings: Colonie High, Lisha Kill Middle, Sand Creek Middle, Forest Park Elementary, Roessleville Elementary, Saddlewood Elementary, Shaker Road Elementary, Veeder Elementary	
Taconic Hills	Central school district	1,403	Questar III	Columbia	Taconic; Hills school buildings: Taconic Hills	
Troy	Enlarged city school district	3,838	Questar III	Rensselaer	Troy school buildings: Troy High, Doyle Middle, Carroll Hill Elementary, School 1, School 2, School 12, School 14, School 16, School 18	
Voorheesville	Central school district	1,178	Capital; Region	Albany	Voorheesville school buildings: Voorheesville Middle/Bouton High, Voorheesville Elementary	
Watervliet	City school district	1,313	Capital; Region	Albany	Watervliet school buildings: Watervliet Jr/Sr High, Watervliet Elementary	
Wynantskill	Union free school district	305	Questar III	Rensselaer	Wynantskill school buildings: Gardner-Dickinsen	
