= Academy Park (Albany, New York) =

Cultural feature park in New York, USA

Coordinates: 42°39′09″N 73°45′17″W

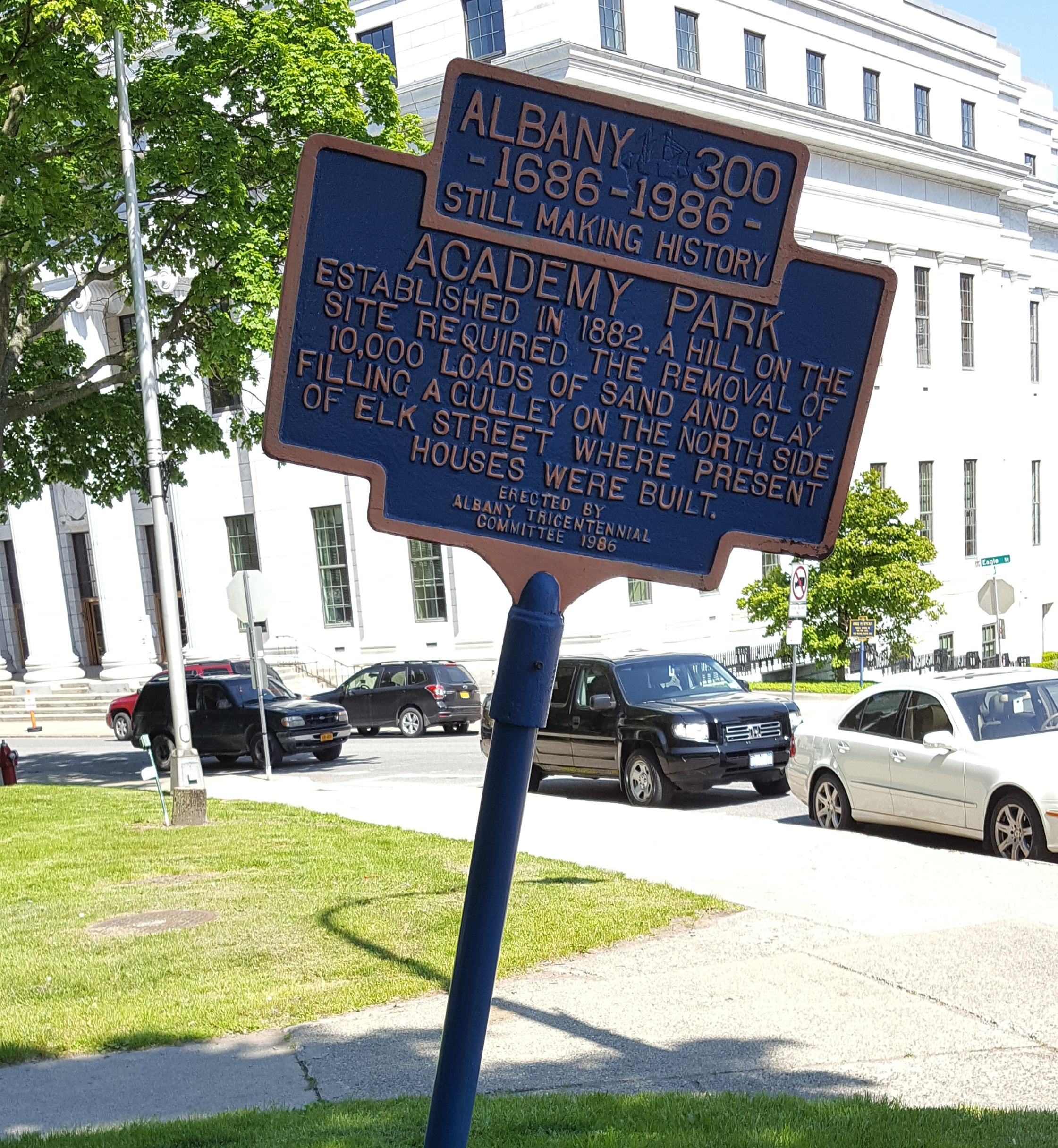
Tricentennial marker at Academy Park in Albany (New York).

Academy Park is a cultural feature park located in the Lafayette Park Historic District of Albany, New York. As an urban park, Academy Park often equates by extension to its surrounding neighborhood near the Albany city hall. The Eagle Street entrance of the New York Court of Appeals Building faces Academy Park.

== History ==
Academy Park was established in 1882. It was the original site of the Dudley Observatory. The Academy Park Fountain, a prominent landmark that was erected in 1988, is situated opposite the New York Court of Appeals Building.

== See also ==
- Old Albany Academy Building
