= Academy Park =

Academy Park may refer to:

- Academic Park, Belgrade, Serbia
- Academy Park (Albany, New York), United States
- Academy Park, a street in Glasgow, Scotland
- Academy Park High School, Sharon Hill, Pennsylvania, United States
