= BKW =

BKW may refer to:

- Beckley Raleigh County Memorial Airport, West Virginia, US, IATA code
- Berne Knox Westerlo Central School District
- BKW FMB Energie AG, a Swiss power utility
- Burger King, NYSE stock symbol
- Berkswell railway station, West Midlands, UK, station code
- BKW Partners, a San Francisco, California technology creative agency
- BKW Health, a San Francisco, California healthcare creative agency
