= Coxsackie-Athens Central School District =

School district in New York, United States

Address
- 24 Sunset Blvd. Greene County Coxsackie, U.S., New York, 12051

District information
- Type: Public / rural school district
- Grades: K-12
- Established: 1947; 79 years ago
- Superintendent: Randall Squier
- Schools: 4

Students and staff
- Students: 1,180 (2020-2021)
- Teachers: 112 (2016)
- Student–teacher ratio: 13:1

Other information
- Website: www.cacsd.org

Coxsackie-Athens is a rural New York State school district located along the Hudson River, approximately 20 miles south of Albany. Known as C-A, to people in the region, Coxsackie-Athens has around 1,200 students K-12.

The district has four schools: Edward J. Arthur Elementary; Coxsackie Elementary; Coxsackie-Athens Middle School; and Coxsackie-Athens High school.

The district has a satellite campus in the Village of Athens and a main campus in the Village of Coxsackie where the district office is located. All the schools are located in Coxsackie, except for the Edward J. Arthur school in Athens.

== Staff ==
As of the 2016–17 school year, the principals of schools were:

- Coxsackie Elementary School: Karen Miller
- Edward J. Arthur Elementary School: James Martino
- Coxsackie Middle School: David Proper
- Coxsackie High School: Heath C. Quiles

The Superintendent of the schools is Randall Squier.

== Sports ==
Coxsackie-Athens is part of Section II in New York State and the Patroon Conference. Patroon Conference members include: Coxsackie-Athens, Greenville High School, Catskill High School, Cairo-Durham High School, Hudson High School, Chatham High School, Maple Hill High School, Taconic Hills High School, and Rensselaer.
