= Hudson City School District =

There are at least two public school districts in the United States named Hudson City School District. These include:

- Hudson City School District (New York); Hudson, New York
- Hudson City School District (Ohio); Hudson, Ohio
