= Greenville High School =

Greenville High School is the name of several high schools in the United States:

- Greenville High School (Georgia), Greenville, Georgia
- Greenville High School (Illinois), Greenville, Illinois
- Greenville Consolidated School, Greenville, Maine
- Greenville High School (Michigan), Greenville, Michigan
- Greenville High School (Mississippi), Greenville, Mississippi
- Greenville High School (New York), Greenville, New York
- Greenville High School (Ohio), Greenville, Ohio
- Greenville Junior/Senior High School, in Greenville Area School District, Pennsylvania
- Greenville Senior High School, Greenville, South Carolina
- Greenville Technical Charter High School, Greenville, South Carolina
- Greenville High School (Texas), Greenville, Texas
