= New York Court of Appeals Building =

Offices of New York state's highest court in Albany

- U.S. National Register of Historic Places
- U.S. Historic district – Contributing property
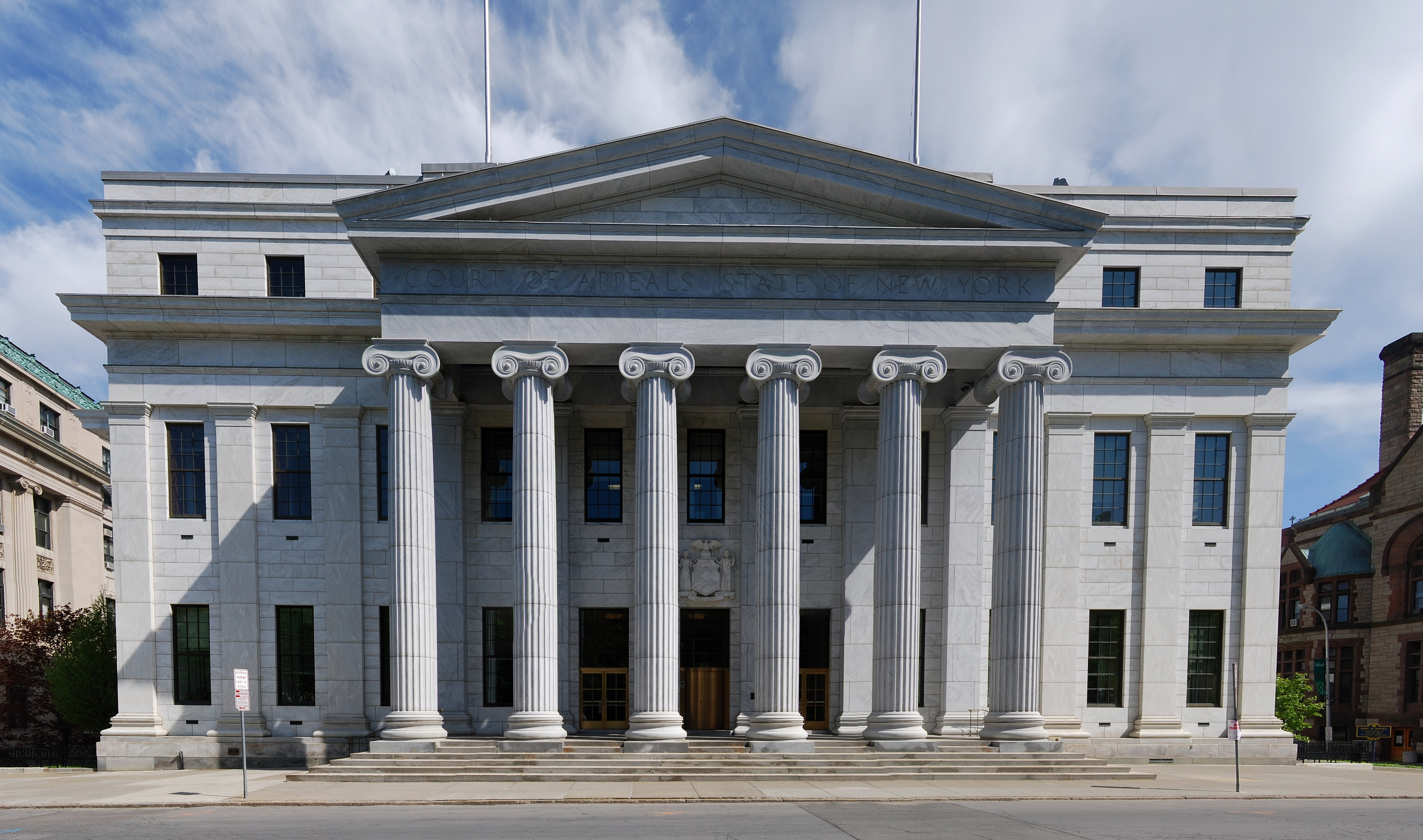
- West (front) elevation, 2009

- Location within New York
- Location within Albany
- Location: Albany, NY
- Coordinates: 42°39′8″N 73°45′13″W
- Built: 1842
- Architect: Henry Rector
- Architectural style: Greek Revival
- Part of: Lafayette Park Historic District (ID78001837)
- NRHP reference No.: 71000520
- Added to NRHP: February 18, 1971

The New York Court of Appeals Building, officially referred to as Court of Appeals Hall, is located at the corner of Eagle and Pine streets in central Albany, New York, United States. It is a stone Greek Revival building built in 1842 from a design by Henry Rector. In 1971 it was listed on the National Register of Historic Places, one of seven buildings housing a state's highest court currently so recognized. (Note: The other six are Hawaii, Massachusetts, Minnesota, New Mexico, Ohio, and South Carolina.) Seven years later it was included as a contributing property when the Lafayette Park Historic District was listed on the Register.

When built it was known as the State Hall, housing not the court (which sat in the state capitol) but its clerks. In addition to them, it was the offices of several other officials of the state's executive branch. Four years after its completion, a new state constitution was adopted, uniting two separate court hierarchies into one with the Court of Appeals as the highest court in the state.

Rector's design incorporates all three classical orders in the building's rotunda and uses stone arches to support the ceilings in an early attempt at fireproofing. It is one of only two extant buildings known to have been designed by him. Other architects were involved in later work on the building. Henry Hobson Richardson designed the courtroom, originally located in the nearby state capitol in the 1880s and described by a visiting Lord Coleridge as "the finest ... in the world".

Lewis Pilcher oversaw a rear addition in the early 20th century when the courtroom was moved as it had outgrown its traditional space in the capitol, taking Richardson's courtroom along with it except for the ceiling. The building has been through two more renovations since. In the late 1950s it was refaced and the original foundation replaced. An early 21st-century project removed the cupola, added small wings on both sides and completely overhauled the building's internal infrastructure as well as restoring much of the original interior decoration.

== Building ==
The courthouse occupies half of the block between Columbia, Eagle, Lodge and Pine streets. The building itself takes up the southwestern quadrant; its parking lot, the southeast. The land slopes gently to the east, reflecting the proximity of the Hudson River one-half mile (800 m) in that direction.

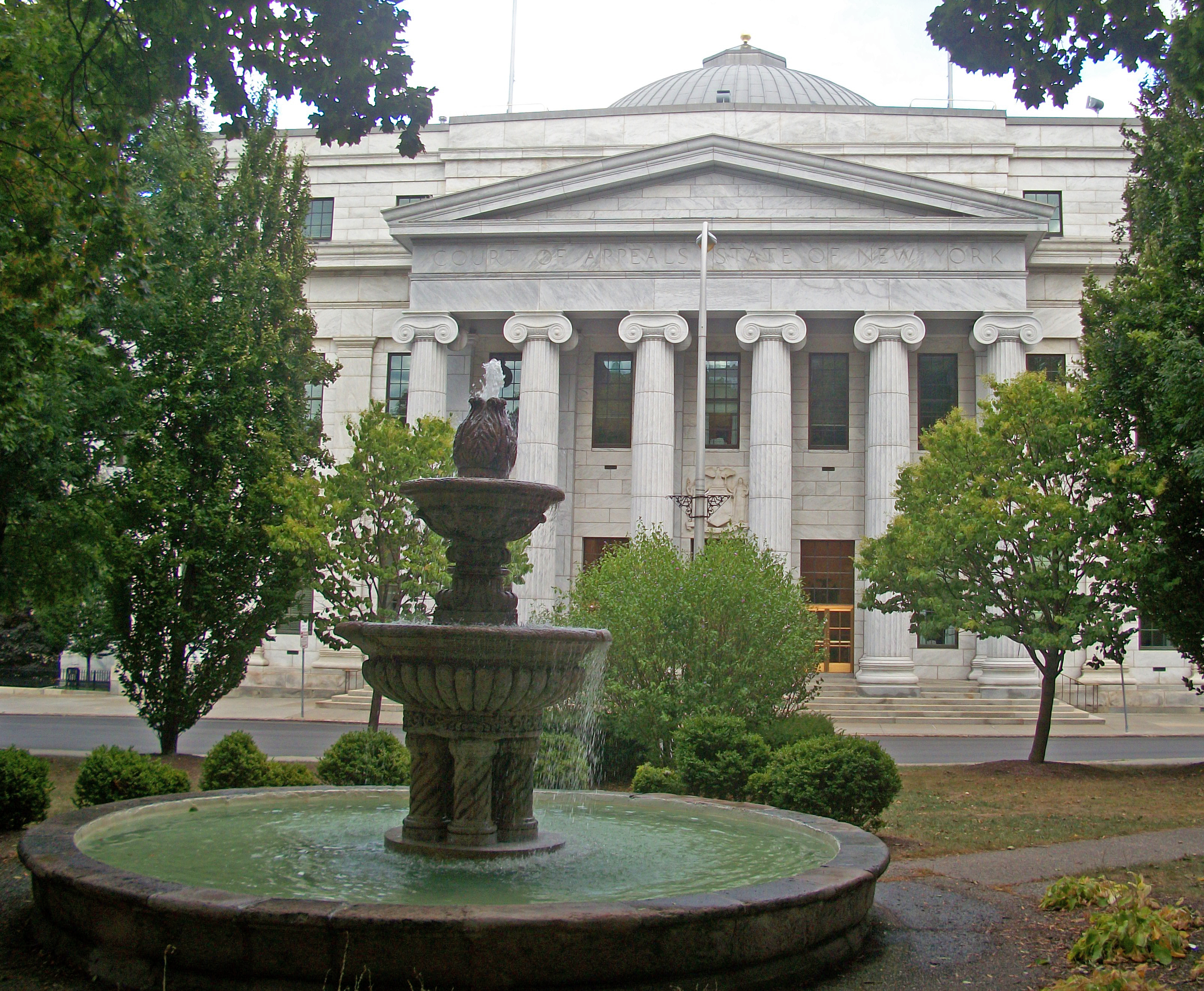
The building with a fountain of Academy Park in the foreground.

In the surrounding neighborhood are many similarly large buildings, most of them governmental or institutional and contributing properties to their historic districts. On the northern half of the block is the Albany County courthouse, an early 20th-century neoclassical building architecturally sympathetic to the Court of Appeals building. South, across Pine, is Albany's City Hall, a stone Romanesque Revival building by Henry Hobson Richardson from the 1880s, also listed on the Register individually. Just to its south, visible from the Court of Appeals building through Corning Park behind City Hall, is St. Peter's Episcopal Church, a French Gothic-style edifice by Richard Upjohn and his son. It is a National Historic Landmark (NHL) as well as a contributing property to the Downtown Albany Historic District, which borders the Lafayette Park Historic District to the east at this point.

Across Eagle Street is the two-acre (0.81 ha) open space of Academy Park. Across it, slightly to the northwest, straddling the boundary between it and the larger Lafayette Park beyond, is the Old Albany Academy Building, an 1815 stone Federal-style work by Philip Hooker that now serves as administrative offices of the City School District of Albany. Its modest scale is in contrast to the monumental New York State Education Department Building, visible across Lafayette Park. Above it the Alfred E. Smith Building's 34 stories tower over the New York State Capitol, also an NHL, across Washington Avenue (New York State Route 5) to the west. The taller towers of the modernist Empire State Plaza are to the southeast. East of the Court of Appeals building, across Lodge Street, is St. Mary's Church, home to the city's oldest Roman Catholic congregation and another listed property that contributes to the Downtown Albany Historic District.

=== Exterior ===
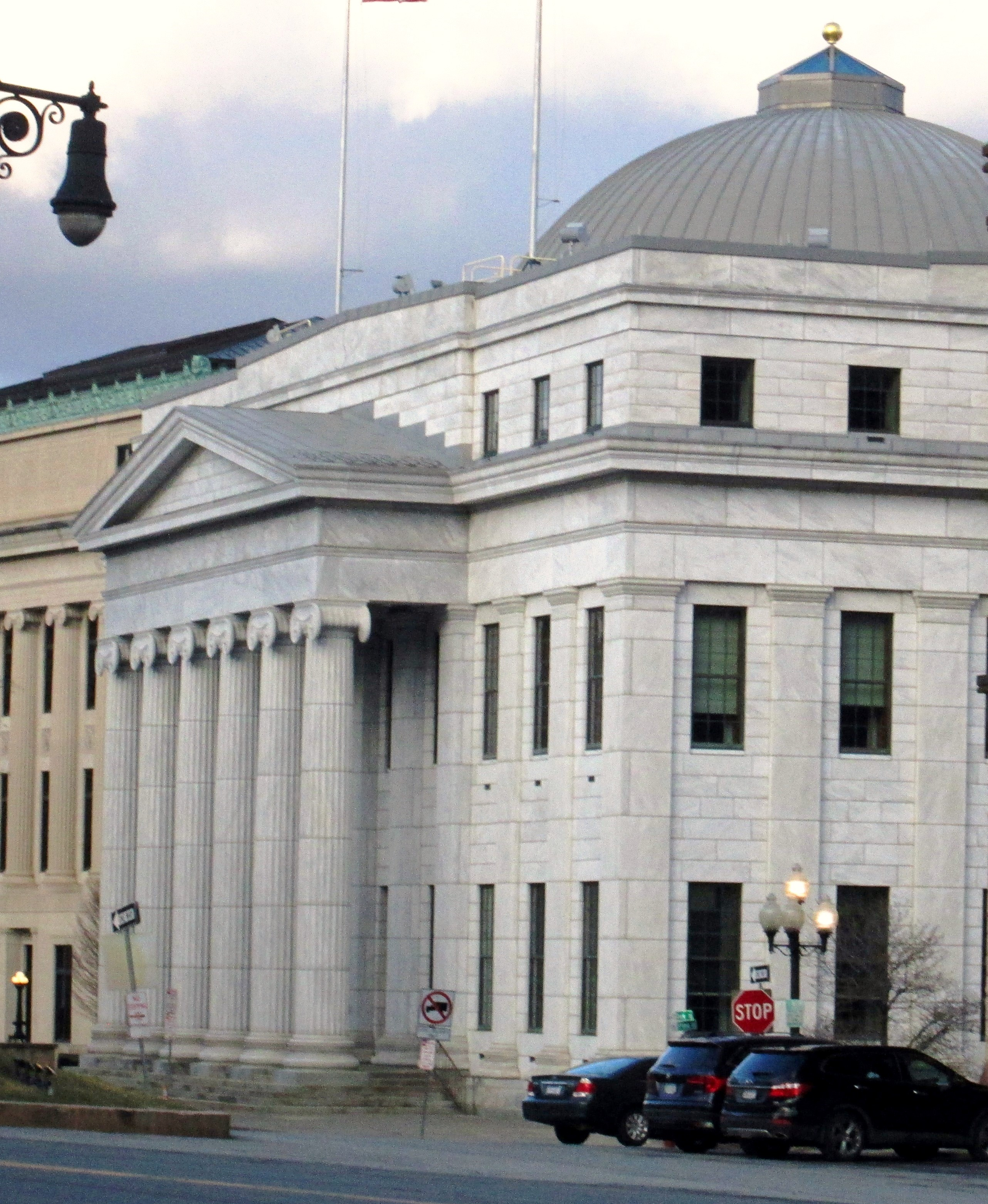
A view from the west with the dome visible.

The building itself is a three-story, 11-by-7-bay structure with a wing on the north, two small wings on the east and a larger addition from the exposed basement on that side. It is faced with load-bearing marble blocks, laid as thick as five feet (1.5 m) at the basement level, on a concrete foundation. At the top is a flat roof with a copper-sheathed dome in the center.

In the middle of the east (front) facade is a five-bay projecting portico. Six round fluted Ionic columns support a pediment with plain entablature. On the building itself 12 square smooth Doric pilasters divide the bays. Above the main entrance is a relief of the state seal. Both stories are set with narrow nine-over-nine double-hung sash windows.

Above the columns and pilasters is a plain frieze divided by a small molded cornice. On the portico, the upper portion of the frieze has the legend "Court of Appeals State of New York" engraved in it. Above it is another, broader, overhanging cornice, also found on the pediment. The third story has the same nine-over-nine double-hung sash. Above it is a smaller cornice and parapet. In the middle of the roof is the dome, clad in stainless steel, with an oculus and gold leaf finial at the top.

=== Interior ===
Inside the ceilings are supported by groin-vaulted stone arches rather than timber framing. Floors and stairs are laid in marble flagstone. The first floor has a library and lounge for attorneys, and the John Jay Room, for public events and overflow viewing of oral arguments via closed-circuit television. It and other public areas of the first floor have teak paneling and molding.

All seven judges' (Note: In keeping with the inversion of the federal relationship in New York's judicial nomenclature, where the Supreme Court is below the Court of Appeals, those who sit on the former are called justices and the latter, judges.) chambers are on the second floor, along with their library and the conference room where they meet to cast votes on cases after hearing arguments. The chambers are finished in wooden paneling. A modern Art Deco chandelier lights the conference room. The third floor has some additional library space along with the offices of court and individual judges' clerks.

Under the dome, the rotunda's decorative work uses all three classical orders. Plain Doric columns and capitals on the first floor are topped by carved Ionic columns on the second story. They support ornate Corinthian columns at the top. In the ceiling is The Romance of the Skies, a 1,000-square-foot (93 m^{2}) painting depicting the three seasons when the court is in session.

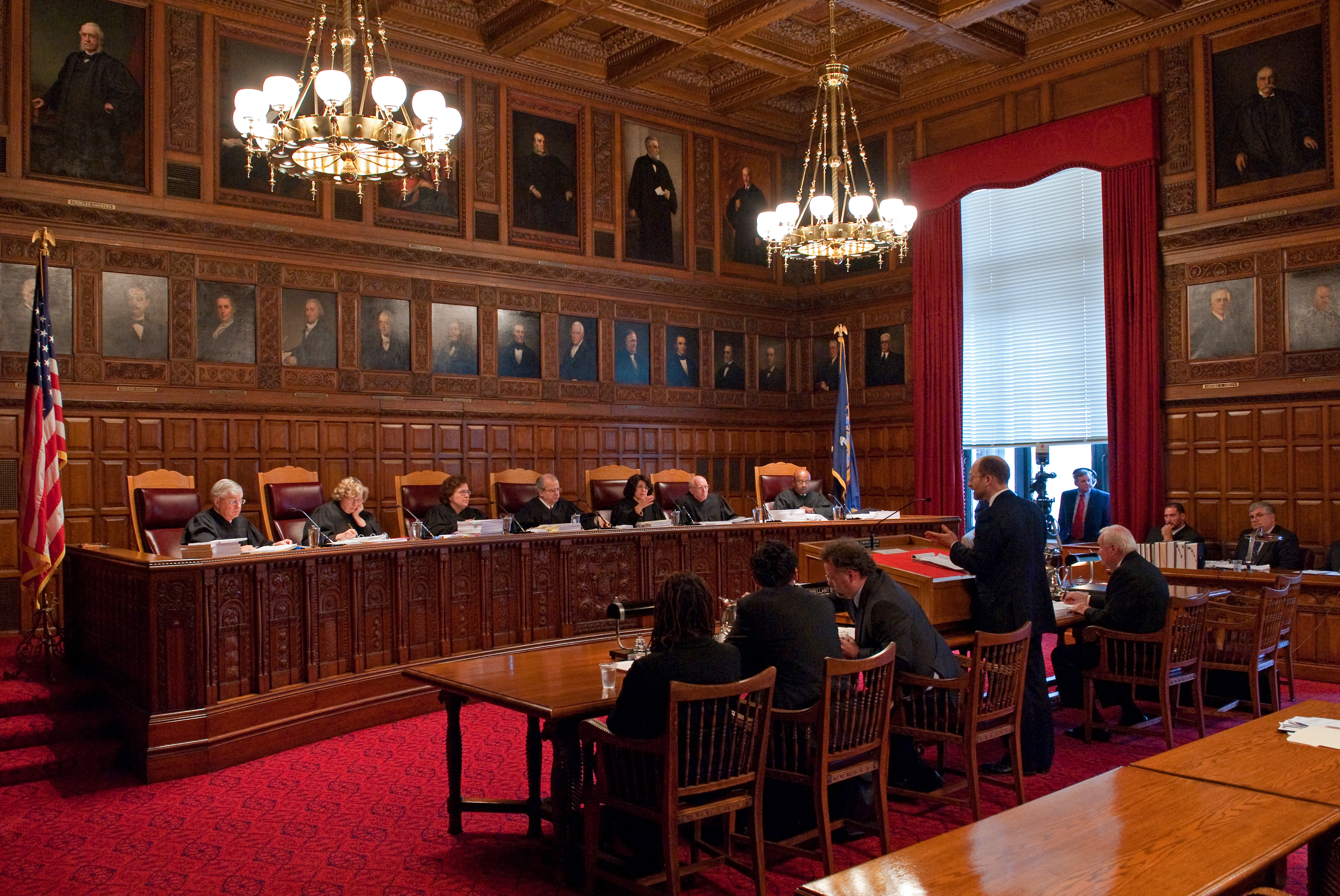
The Court hearing oral arguments in the courtroom

In the rear wing is the courtroom, its interior decorated in ornately hand-carved brown oak, similar to its furniture. Oil portraits of past Court of Appeals judges line the walls up to the 22-foot (6.7 m) carved plaster ceiling. A fireplace of bronze, marble and Mexican onyx is in one wall. The floor has a red carpet decorated with geometric patterns.

== History ==
Originally, the building housed various state officials rather than the court. Insufficient space at the capitol led to the court's takeover of the building in the 1910s, the first of three major renovations in a century.

=== 1842–1917: State Hall ===
Created in 1777 during the Revolution, the government of the state of New York did not assume full governmental responsibilities for its territory until the end of the war and independence. After several other cities had held the title, Albany was formally established as the state capital in the 1790s. The new state government did not need many buildings. Both houses of the state legislature met in Albany's City Hall until the first state capitol was built in 1819; governors rented residences in the city; and the two highest state courts, the Court of Chancery and the Court for the Trial of Impeachments and the Correction of Errors, heard cases in the county courthouse or the capitol. For those officials who needed a dedicated workspace, the first state office building, Old State Hall, was erected in the early 1800s at what is now the corner of Lodge and State streets.

In 1833, the occupants complained that the building was running out of space and inadequate in other ways—in particular, they said, the many records kept within it could be destroyed in a fire. The legislature directed the capitol's trustees to find land for a new building. The trustees acquired the current land and commissioned local architect Henry Rector to design the building.

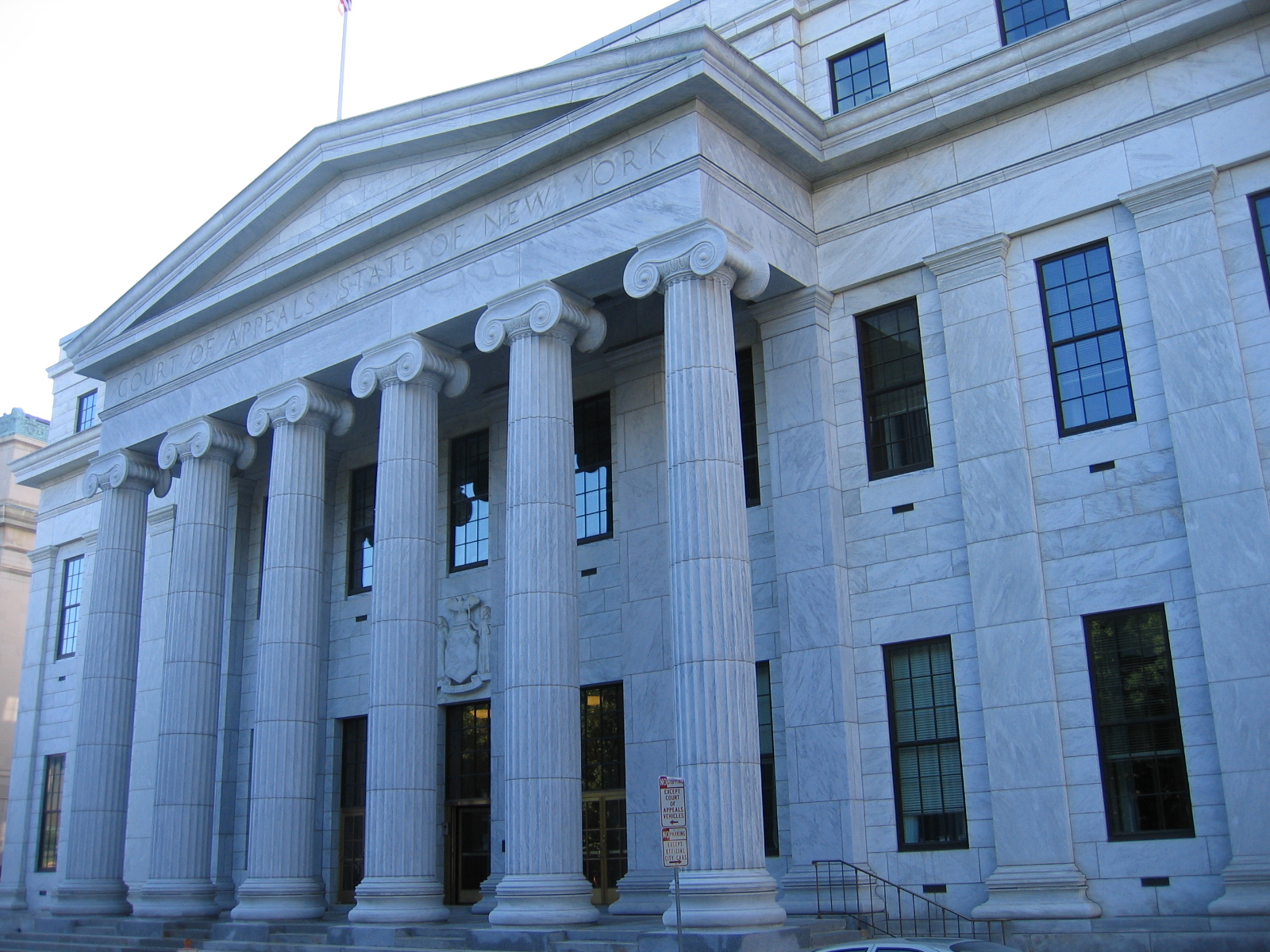
A close-up view of the portico

According to architectural critic Talbot Hamlin, Rector's design "proclaimed the complete triumph of the Greek Revival in the Albany region." The column bases and capitals on the exterior were copied from the Temple of Athena Nike on the Acropolis. Marble for the building, mandated by the legislature, was quarried by inmates at the new Sing Sing Prison near the present-day village of Ossining in Westchester County and shipped up the Hudson River on barges. It was completed by 1842 at a total cost of $350,000 ($10.9 million in 2025 dollars). No other buildings of Rector's survive except for a row of houses on Westerlo Street in Albany's Pastures Historic District.

In addition to its architecture, the building would be notable for two aspects of its engineering as well. One was the use of the stone groin vaults to support the ceilings instead of the timber framing common at the time, an early attempt at fireproofing. The other was the stone staircase in the middle of the rotunda, which started at the first floor and cantilevered out up to the third floor with no visible means of support.

After the building's completion, the state chancellor, Register of Chancery, clerk of the Court of Appeals and its Supreme Court moved in. The state's executive branch was represented by the attorney general, auditor, canal appraisers and commissioners, comptroller and state engineer and surveyor-general. In 1846, a new state constitution reformed the courts, eliminating the Court of Chancery and relegating the Supreme Court to its current role of both appellate and trial court, supreme in that it has the last word on findings of fact but deferring to the new Court of Appeals on questions of law.

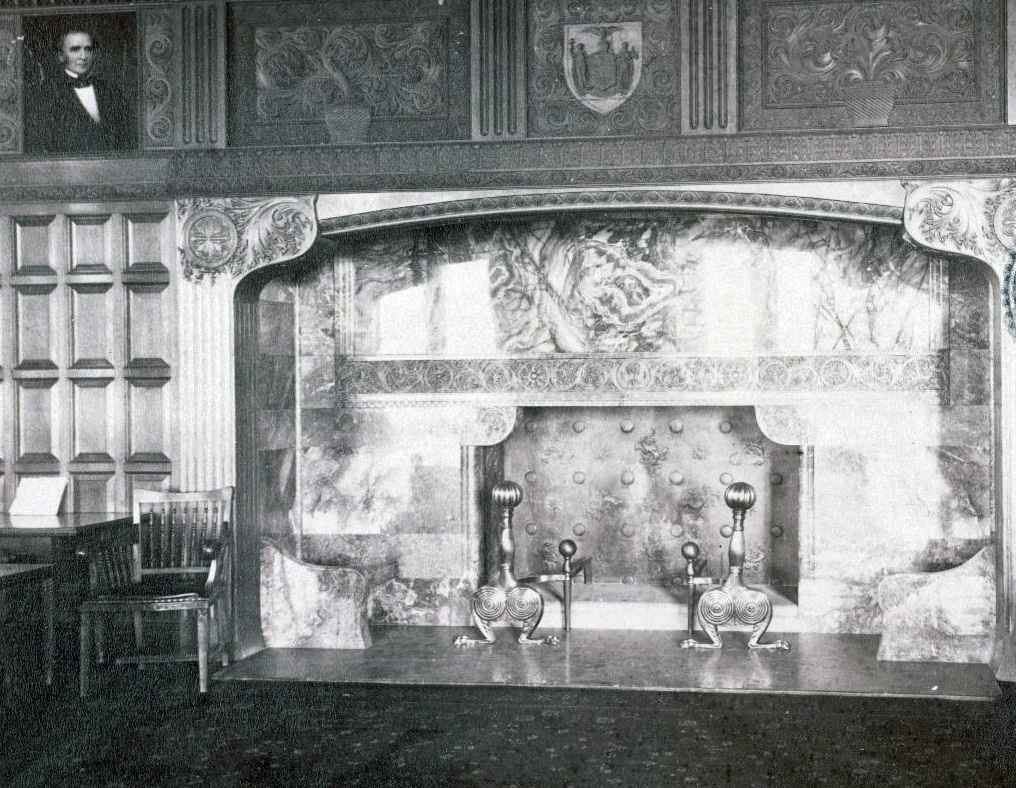
Contemporary photograph of fireplace in the courtroom when that was in the state capitol

However, the tenants of the building remained unchanged. The Court of Appeals sat in the state capitol, both the former building and the current one. In the latter, Henry Hobson Richardson, supervising a construction process that had become delayed since it began in the early 1870s from Thomas Fuller's original plan, designed an ornate wooden courtroom with carved oak walls and furniture. The judges began hearing oral arguments there in 1884. It was described by a visiting Lord Coleridge, Lord Chief Justice of England and Wales, as "the finest courtroom in the world."

As the 19th century became the 20th, the state grew and, with it, its government. By 1909 the judges and lawyers alike were complaining that the court's capitol space was inadequate to its modern legal needs. The following year the legislature directed the court to appoint one of its judges to work with the state architect, then Franklin B. Ware, to determine whether the old State Hall could be renovated into an adequate facility. The court appointed Judge William E. Werner. He and Ware commissioned a report from a Rochester architect who concluded that such a renovation was possible.

Even though the fire that ravaged the capitol in 1911 made the need for new court space more pressing, Ware refused to endorse the report, saying the renovation proposed was inadequate. Instead, he proposed redeveloping the entire area around the capitol (today the Lafayette Park Historic District) similarly to Capitol Hill in Washington, including a new courthouse on Swan Street.

Ware's plan was rejected, and Lewis Pilcher replaced him as state architect. He proceeded with the planned renovation of State Hall. In keeping with the wishes of Chief Judge Willard Bartlett, Pilcher's most significant change to the building was a wing on the east to accommodate Richardson's courtroom, which could be moved to State Hall with the exception of its original ceiling. (Note: It can still be seen in the capitol's room 315.) On the interior of the existing building, the rotunda was faced in dark yellow faux Caen stone, and the judges' library, conference room and individual chambers were all painted in shades of cream and lit with pendant drop-globes.

The court approved the redesign in 1914. Work began after the contract was signed the next year; it was complete in time for a formal dedication at the beginning of 1917. The building was at that time officially renamed Court of Appeals Hall, the legend still on its pediment. Governor Charles S. Whitman spoke at the ceremony, saying the building was now dedicated to "the noblest purpose to which a building or a life can be dedicated, the administration of justice."

=== 1918–1959: Second renovation ===
For 30 years the converted State Hall served the needs of judges and lawyers alike. By the late 1940s its age was becoming evident. The state's Department of Public Works reported that the portico was in danger of collapsing, the interior was looking shabby, and the electrical wiring and heating needed to be replaced. Nothing would be done about this situation until Governor Averell Harriman made a surprise inspection of the building in 1956. Two years later another renovation began under state architect Carl Larson and Judge Charles W. Froessel.

The work had been delayed while the judges considered, and rejected, building an entirely new courthouse, as their predecessors had in 1917. They heard cases in the Appellate Division courtroom at the nearby county courthouse, while they received temporary chambers at the capitol. The clerk of courts and his staff took their temporary quarters at an old storage building at Lodge Street and Maiden Lane. The reporter relocated to 6 Elk Street.

Early in the renovation, a short circuit in the elevator machine room started a serious fire that destroyed the roof and dome and badly damaged the rotunda. Work continued, and shortly afterward another serious problem was discovered when excavations around the foundation disclosed that the eastern corners of the building had each sunk 5 inches (13 cm) since 1842, resulting in severe damage to floors, windows, lintels and the interior arches. The original foundations of rubble on clay were replaced with concrete.

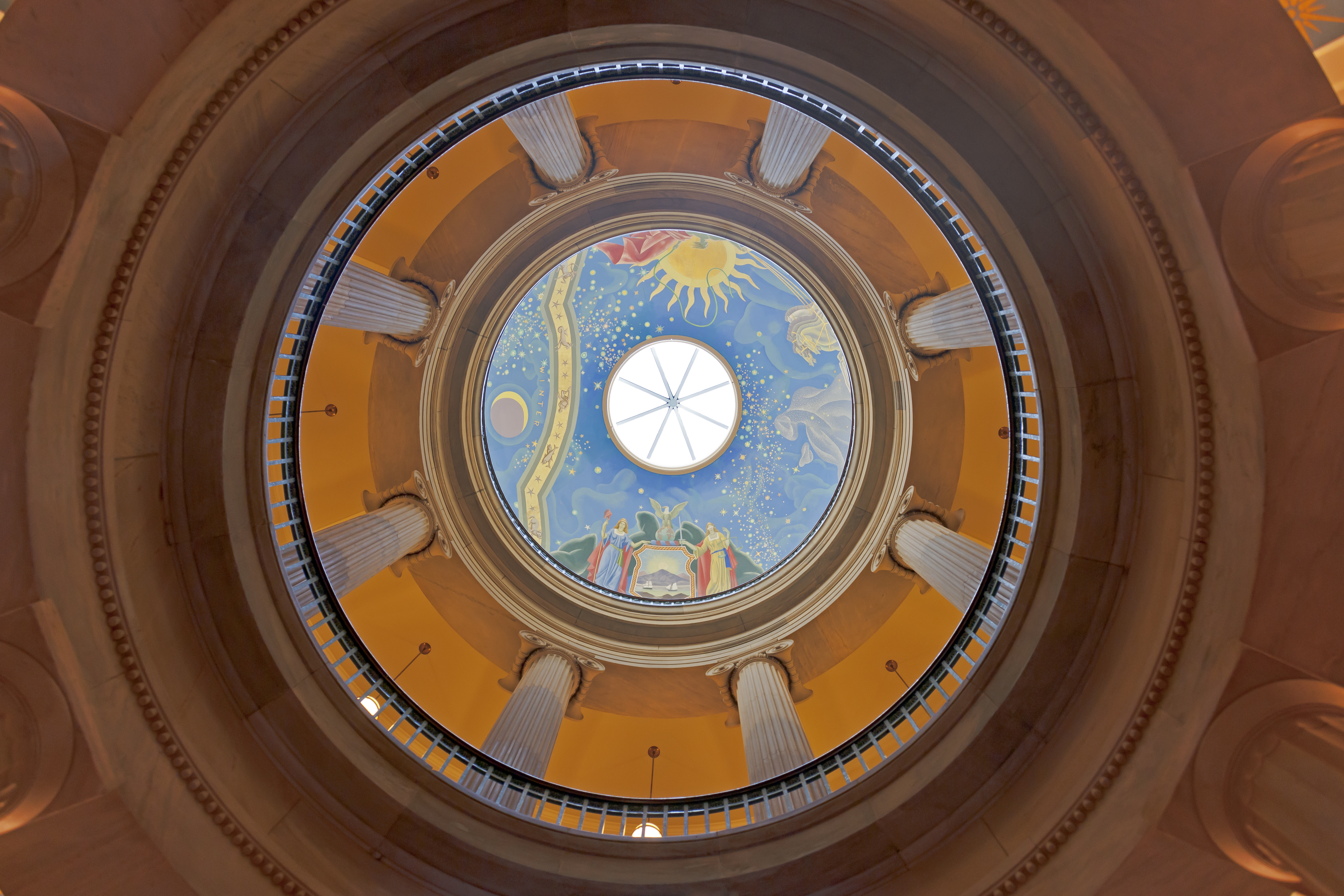
Dome interior with Savage mural at top

A larger new dome, 64 feet (20 m) wide and 23 feet (7.0 m) high, built of steel beams and light concrete planks, replaced the original. It was sheathed in lead-coated copper and topped with a wooden cupola. Inside the dome a 34-foot–wide (10 m) mural by Eugene Savage, The Romance of the Skies, depicts the three seasons—fall, winter and spring—during which the court sits. Except for the removal of the cantilevered stone staircase, now deemed too structurally unstable to use, the rotunda remained unchanged.

It was the only space inside that did. Many rooms received new coats of paint, and the ceiling arches were hidden from view by new walls. New elevators and stairs were installed to replace the original stone stair. Additional amenities, such as air conditioning, an enamel-walled kitchen and television in the reception room, were added for the judges. Their robing room was paneled in birch. Two of the seven judges had chambers on the first floor; the rest were upstairs. The paintings that hung in Robertson's courtroom were cleaned and rehung; a new carpet was installed.

On the outside much of the original marble was removed and replaced with stone quarried in Vermont. Six Ionic columns and new stairs were built for the reconstructed portico. Above the main entrance, an 8-ton (7.3 t) emblem of the state seal sculpted by C. Paul Jennewein was installed.

Despite the fire and the structural issues, the project was finished ahead of schedule in 1959. Nelson Rockefeller, who had succeeded Harriman, gave the court his full support. At the rededication ceremony that October, Chief Judge Albert Conway symbolically accepted the keys from him. Conway observed as he did that the new building reflected the "permanence of an ideal".

=== 1960–present: Third renovation ===
As it had following the 1917 work, the courthouse continued to serve its purpose for the next three decades. By 1999, however, it once again seemed inadequate to the needs of its users. The thick walls made it difficult to adapt for modern electrical and telecommunications purposes. The infrastructure within was almost half a century old, making it difficult to heat and cool the building. The space taken up by those walls meant that the courtroom was the only place the judges and all their combined staff could hold meetings. There were also very few spaces for the public within the building, frustrating attempts to make the court and its history transparent and accessible.

The judges decided that it was necessary to make some small additions to the building along with the infrastructure upgrades. Chief Judge Judith Kaye designated Judge Richard C. Wesley, later elevated to the federal Second Circuit Court of Appeals, as the court's liaison to the project, now managed by the Dormitory Authority of the State of New York as the state architect's position had been abolished. After the necessary appropriations from the legislature, work began in 2001. During the 17 months it took, the judges continued to hear arguments in the courtroom but worked out of temporary quarters outside the city. Project architects were DeWolff Partnership Architects LLP of Rochester.

As the building had been listed on the National Register of Historic Places in 1971, since its last renovation, preservation and restoration were as important as the expansions. The State Historic Preservation Office was closely involved with the process. It mandated that the newly installed wings on the sides of the building be distinguishable from the original facades after the marble was once again replaced with newly quarried Vermont stone, even though they were architecturally sympathetic to Rector's original design. As a result, they have narrower bays and pilasters, smooth at the base rather than fluted, to subtly distinguish them from the original building.

Elsewhere on the exterior, the dome was made over. The lead-plated copper installed in 1959 was replaced with stainless steel and the cupola from that renovation replaced with the current oculus. Its high-performance glass keeps out ultraviolet light and reduces heat inside. The gold-plated sphere that had topped the cupola remains above the oculus.

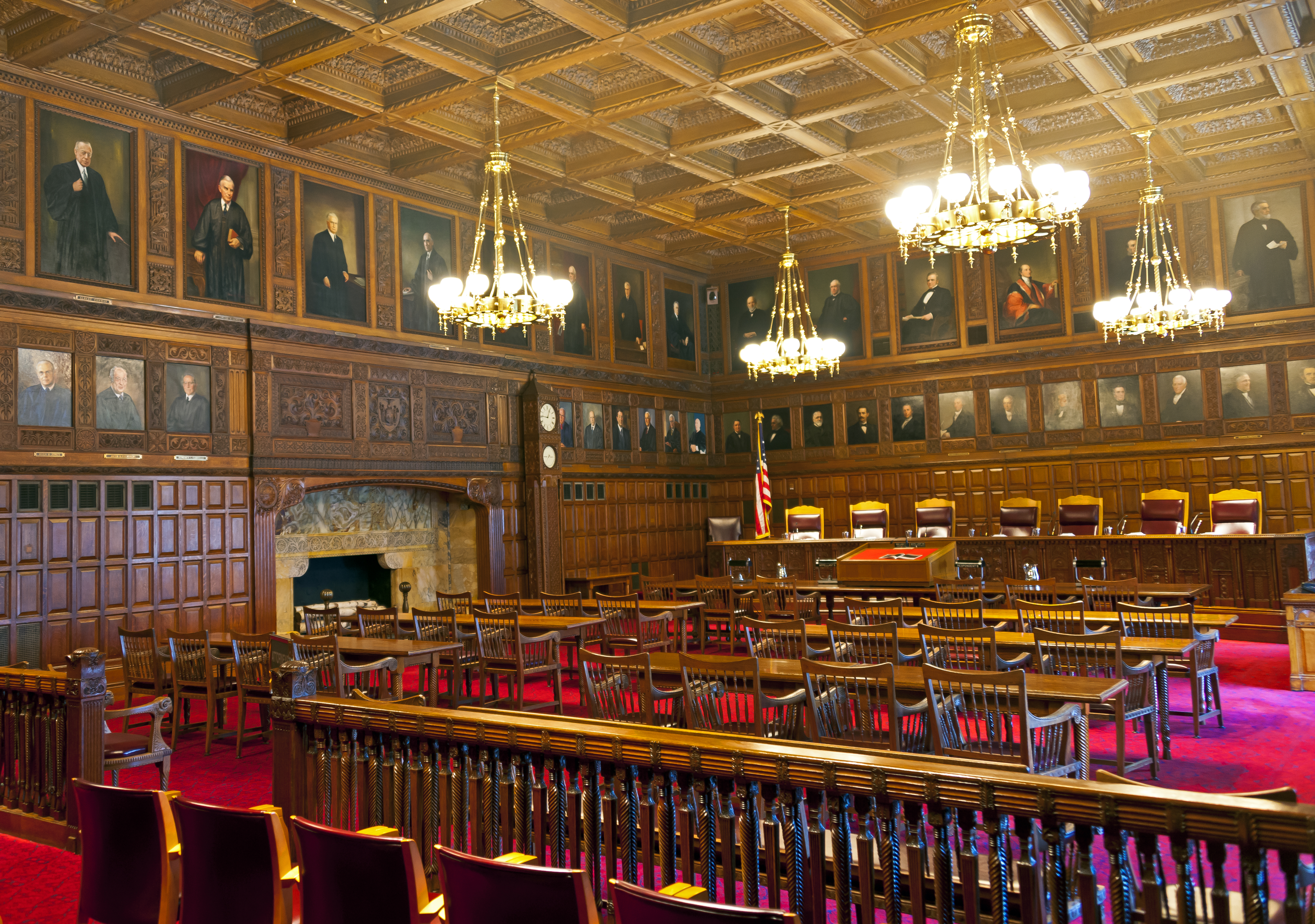
Courtroom in 2015, after renovation

Inside, the renovations once more made the ceiling groin vaults visible. The entire infrastructure was replaced, and the newly created space in the main building, plus the additional space in the wings, brought the building to 93,000 square feet (8,600 m^{2}) of total floor space. The Red Room and the Jay Room were created on the first floor to host public functions and exhibits on the history of the court, as well as providing overflow space for those who wished to hear oral arguments in cases that attracted significant interest. All the judges' chambers were now located on the second floor, a change that Kaye had particularly sought.

Photographs and other historical records were studied closely for information about interior decoration that matched earlier eras. The rotunda was done in shades of beige, cream and yellow, as it had appeared to be originally. On the first floor carpets, blues and reds were used following early 20th-century practices. The Red Room and all offices similarly have a painted faux-finish on the walls. Since the third floor is now largely new construction, it uses green primarily. Lighting used throughout duplicates the 1959 renovation, except in the courtroom, where reconstructions of the 1884 chandeliers complement a newly designed carpet.

== See also ==
- National Register of Historic Places listings in Albany, New York
- Architecture of Albany, New York
