= Old Albany Academy Building =

- Albany Academy
- U.S. National Register of Historic Places
- U.S. Historic district – Contributing property
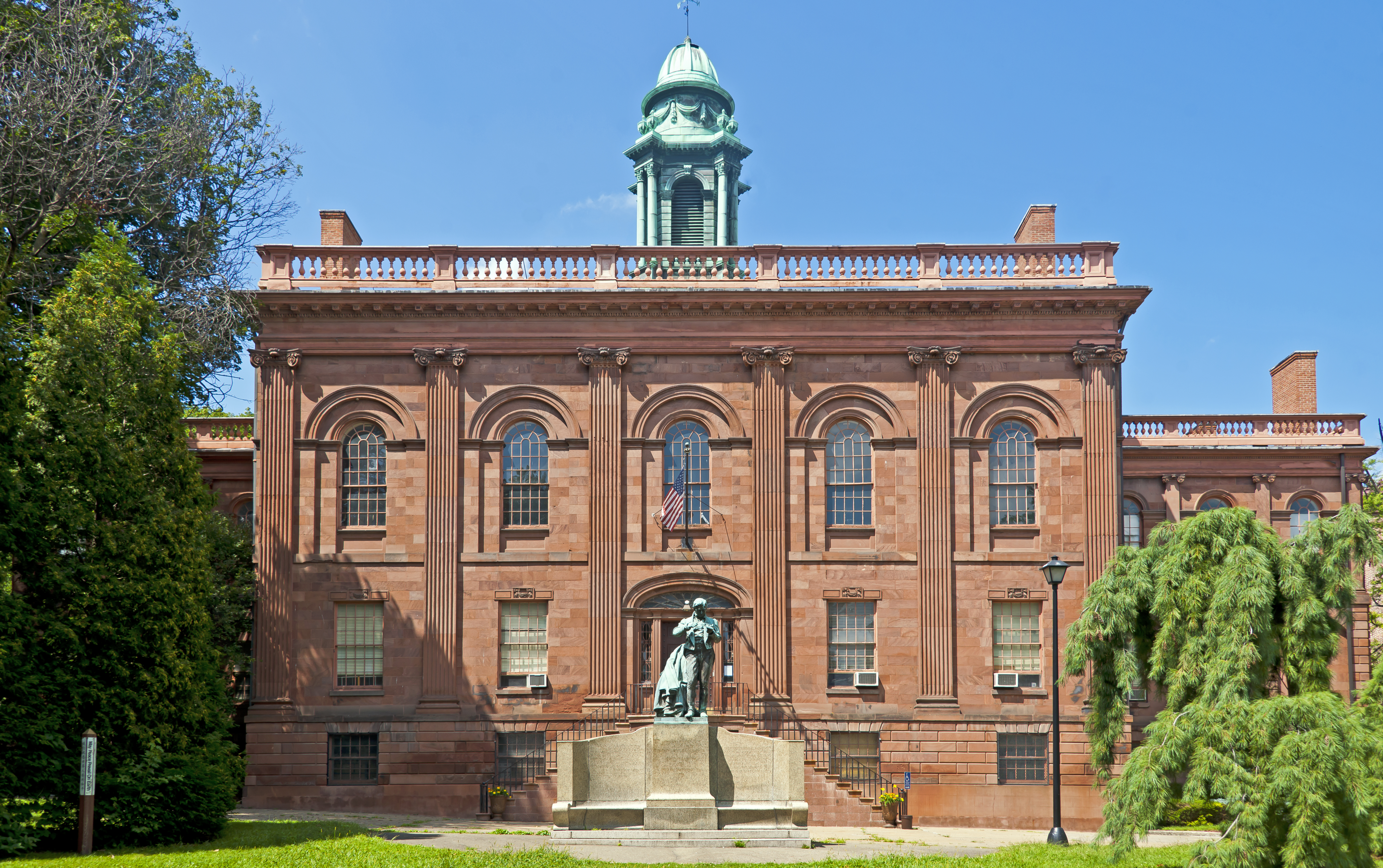
- East (front) elevation with statue of Henry, 2015

- Location within New York Location within the United States
- Location: Albany, NY
- Coordinates: 42°39′10″N 73°45′17″W
- Area: 1 acre (4,000 m^{2})
- Built: 1815
- Architect: Philip Hooker
- Part of: Lafayette Park Historic District (ID78001837)
- NRHP reference No.: 71000515
- Added to NRHP: February 18, 1971

The old Albany Academy building, known officially as Academy Park by the City School District of Albany, its owner, and formerly known as the Joseph Henry Memorial, is located in downtown Albany, New York, United States. It is a Federal style brownstone building erected in the early 19th century. In 1971, it was listed in the National Register of Historic Places. Later, it was included as a contributing property when the Lafayette Park Historic District was established.

At the time it was built it was home to The Albany Academy, established a few years earlier. Architect Philip Hooker's Federal style design is the city's oldest public building, and the less altered of his two intact non-residential buildings in the city. In the 1820s, Joseph Henry co-discovered electrical inductance in experiments conducted in the building, a discovery that was important to the later development of the telegraph and, by extension, the modern telecommunications of the Information Age. A statue of him by John Flanagan was placed out front to commemorate his accomplishment. T. Romeyn Beck wrote his important early works on forensic medicine while serving as the school's principal for three decades.

In the 1930s, the Academy moved to a new building in a different section of the city that it still occupies. It sold the building to the city of Albany; in 1986 the city's school district took ownership and began its current use of the building for its main offices. Another Albany architect, Marcus T. Reynolds, supervised renovations to the building's interior. It has otherwise remained intact.

== Building ==
The land historically associated with the building is one of the two acres of Academy Park, located between Eagle, Elk and Hawk streets. It straddles the boundary with Lafayette Park to the west; it is a contributing property to the associated historic district. The terrain rises gently from the Hudson River a half-mile (800 m) to the east and the ravine of Sheridan Hollow to the north. The Albany County Vietnam War memorial is located a short distance to the west.

Many other listed properties, most of them also government buildings that contribute to the district, are nearby. Opposite Lafayette Park on Hawk is the monumental Classical Revival New York State Department of Education Building, with Cathedral of All Saints, seat of the Episcopal Diocese of Albany, concealed at the other end of the block. To the southwest, across Washington Avenue (New York State Route 5), is the state capitol, a National Historic Landmark, between East and West Capitol Park. Opposite the park to the east, along Eagle, are the county courthouse, the New York Court of Appeals building, and Albany City Hall. A group of rowhouses, also contributing properties, faces the building from across Elk.

The building itself is positioned sideways to Elk Street, with its main entrance on the east (front) facade and its north elevation facing the rowhouses opposite. It has a two-story five-bay main block of Nyack sandstone with an exposed basement. The stone there is rusticated, as it is on the first story of both the three-bay north and south wings.

On the main block, the basement windows are set with 10-over-10 double-hung sash windows topped by splayed-stone lintels. Just above them the water table serves as a base for the six fluted Ionic pilasters that rise both stories, forming a colossal order. On the first story they separate 15-over-15 double-hung sash with a carved panel in the middle of the lintel. Stringcourses between the colossal Ionic pilasters separate the first-story windows from their second-story counterparts, also 15-over-15 but arched and set in a slightly recessed double arch. Slight cornices there form the springline for the arches.

The pilasters' Ionic capitals support a molded frieze with an egg-and-dart pattern underneath the modillioned cornice at the roofline. Above it is a balustrade. The gently pitched hipped roof is pierced by two brick chimneys at either end with a copper roofed cupola in the middle. It has keystone-arched louvered vents in its lower stage, separated by pairs of smooth Corinthian columns. They support a broad overhanging modillioned cornice, above which is a frieze decorated with swag. Atop the cupola is a flared domed roof with a weathervane.

There are two centrally located entrances on the east. At the top of a pair of sideways stone steps with iron railings is the main entrance, paneled wooden double doors with sidelights and a fanlight. Narrow fluted pilasters flank the doors; the whole entrance is slightly recessed. Below it is a more restrained basement entrance with paneled doors and sidelights in the stone. In front of it is a statue of Joseph Henry on a gray granite pedestal with text explaining his accomplishments.

The two wings are more restrained. The first story rather than the basement has the rustication. Its six-over-six double-hung sash is set in slightly recessed arches. The stringcourse, continuous here, separates it from the second story. There, smooth Ionic pilasters divide the bays. It, too, has six-over-six double-hung sash, set in singly arched windows that are otherwise similar to their counterparts on the main block. The balustrade continues along the roof of the wings as well; both have the same pairs of chimneys at the end.

== History ==
Although it has been a private school for its entire existence, The Albany Academy was established by the city council in 1813 to educate the sons of the city's most prosperous citizens in classics, math and science. Classes began soon after the state granted the school's charter. Starting in 1815 they were held in a building rented from Killian K. Van Rensselaer, a member of one of the city's most prominent families, who had served several terms in Congress.

That same year Philip Hooker, then Albany's most prominent architect, appeared before the school's building committee. He had at that point already designed the nearby City Hall and State Capitol buildings (both since replaced), and pointed to his years of experience and his "close application in the research of ancient and modern architecture." Mayor Philip S. Van Rensselaer laid the building's cornerstone after Hooker got the commission.

Hooker's Federal style design, with extensive classically-inspired decoration, echoed the school's original curricular focus. It shows the influence of New York City Hall by Joseph Francois Mangin and John McComb, Jr., also a new building at that time. Hooker's design included the chapel on the second floor, which survives intact.

The new building was matched with a new school principal, T. Romeyn Beck, when it was opened in 1817. He would serve in that position until 1848, shaping the school profoundly. Not only did he distinguish himself as an administrator, he also made an important contribution to American medicine with Elements of Medical Jurisprudence. Published in 1823, it was the first significant work on forensic medicine. Outside of that field, he was instrumental in establishing the state's geological survey and library.

Beck also hired a talented early graduate of the Academy, Joseph Henry, to return as a science teacher after he finished his studies at Union College in nearby Schenectady in a year. In addition to teaching science, Henry did research at the school with the help of his assistant and students. In 1827, he began experiments with electromagnetism, a recent discovery. He found ways to increase the strength of an electromagnet, and discovered electrical inductance. Often he would demonstrate these properties to students by using a wire routed around the classroom to make an iron bar ring a small bell. This was not only the prototype of the modern electric doorbell, the stronger electrical signal he was able to send over a wire eventually helped Samuel F.B. Morse develop the first practical telegraph. The same principle continues to make long-distance wired data transmission possible. He would later leave to take a position at Princeton University, and eventually became the Smithsonian Institution's first secretary.

For the remainder of the 19th century, the school stayed in Hooker's building, keeping it as it had been designed, even as competing private schools were started and the city began to expand from its early neighborhoods close to the river and, like the school, near downtown. By the 1920s, it was clear more space would be needed, and the academy bought 30 acres (12 ha) on Highland Avenue, in Albany's newer, more suburban neighborhoods. Just before the Great Depression began, the city agreed to buy the school's old building for $450,000 ($8.44 million in modern dollars).

Marcus T. Reynolds, like Hooker the city's most prominent architect in his day, who had designed the new Academy building, supervised the renovation. His changes to the building were primarily on the interior, including a new marble double staircase and modifications to the center hall. On the outside he commissioned a copper replacement for the original wooden cupola that duplicated it exactly. The John Flanagan statue of Henry was placed in the front and the building renamed in his memory. Later in the 1930s, the Albany City School District moved into the building and has used it as its main offices ever since.

== See also ==
- National Register of Historic Places listings in Albany, New York
