= Lafayette Park Historic District =

Neighborhood in Albany, New York

- U.S. National Register of Historic Places
- U.S. Historic district
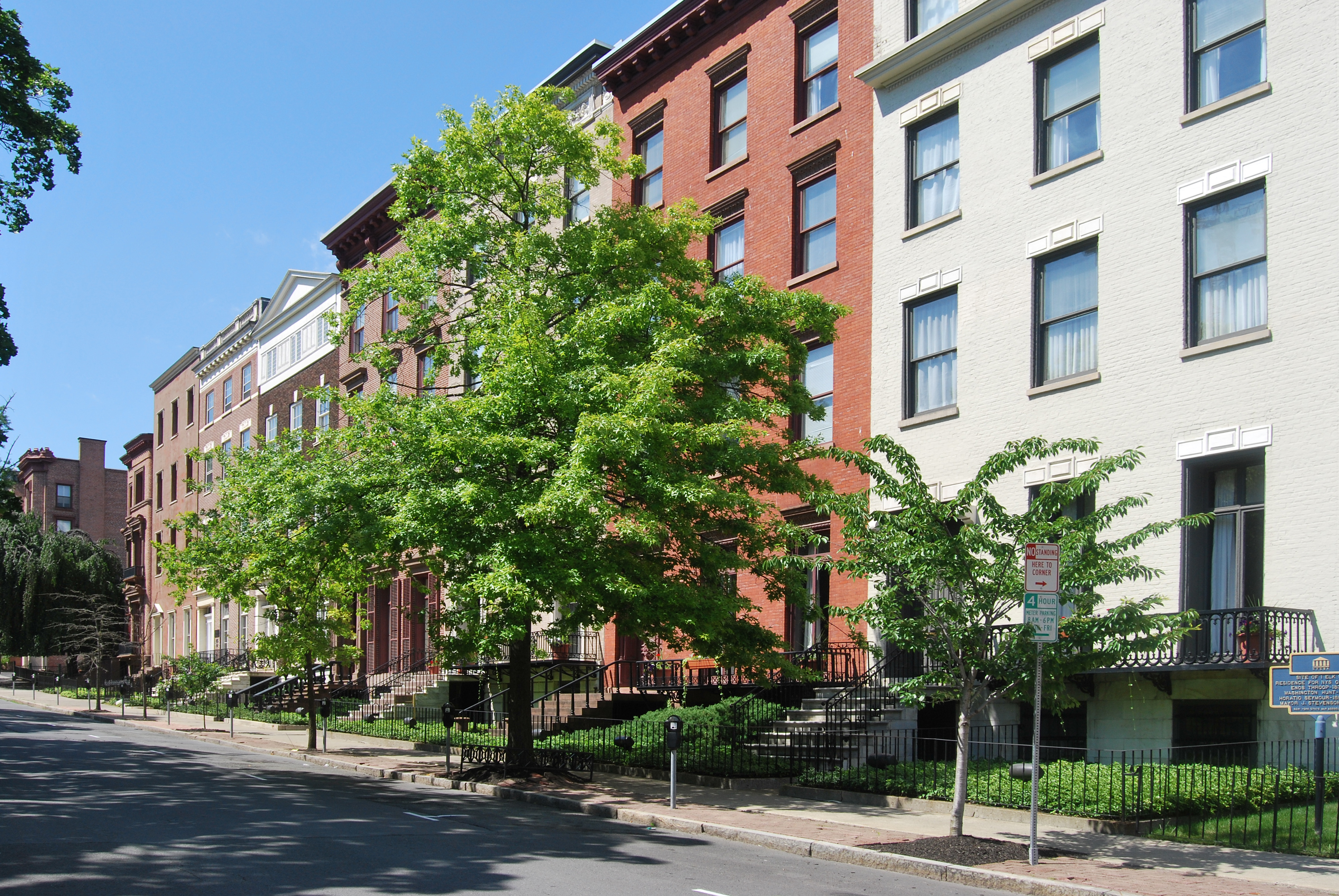
- Elk Street row houses, 2011

- Location within New York Location within the United States
- Interactive map of Lafayette Park Historic District
- Location: Albany, NY
- Coordinates: 42°39′11″N 73°45′24″W
- Area: 36 acres (15 ha; 150,000 m^{2})
- NRHP reference No.: 78001837
- Added to NRHP: November 15, 1978

The Lafayette Park Historic District is located in central Albany, New York, United States. It includes the park and the combination of large government buildings and small rowhouses on the neighboring streets. In 1978 it was recognized as a historic district and listed on the National Register of Historic Places (NRHP). Many of its contributing properties are themselves listed on the National Register. One of them, the New York State Capitol, is a National Historic Landmark as well. Other government buildings include City Hall, the building housing Albany County government, the state's highest court and the offices of its Education Department along with the offices of the City School District of Albany. The Episcopal Diocese of Albany's cathedral is at one corner of the district.

While the state capitol building has always been located on its present site, for most of the 19th century the neighborhood was best known for the townhouses on Elk Street, then one of the most desirable addresses in the city. Many politicians, including some of the state's governors and presidents Martin Van Buren and Franklin D. Roosevelt, lived there at different times. Henry James would recall the neighborhood from his childhood visits to his aunt as "vaguely portentous, like beasts of the forest not wholly exorcised." Two significant technological accomplishments—the development of the first working electromagnet and the construction of the first cantilevered arch bridge—also took place within it. Henry Hobson Richardson, Philip Hooker and Marcus T. Reynolds are among the architects with buildings in the district.

The park that gives the district its name was not actually built until the early 20th century, after larger government buildings had begun to dominate the area. In it and the other three parks are statues commemorating George Washington and Albany natives like Civil War general Phillip Sheridan and electromagnet discoverer Joseph Henry. John Quincy Adams Ward and J. Massey Rhind are among the sculptors represented. Although the district has been affected by modern trends—most of the Elk Street houses are now offices for various organizations that lobby the state government—it has remained mostly intact. It remains a vital part of Albany's public sphere, with the parks having hosted everything from benefit sales for soldiers' medical care during the Civil War to Occupy Albany's tent encampments and protests during the 2010s.

== Geography ==
The 36-acre (15 ha; 150,000 m^{2}) district is rectangular, extending a block to the north and south of Washington Avenue (New York State Route 5), with an irregularly shaped projection at its northeast corner. From its southeast corner, at the intersection of State and Eagle streets, it runs west along State, between the state capitol and the Empire State Plaza office complex to the south. At South Swan Street, it turns north, with the Alfred E. Smith State Office Building and other contributing properties of the adjacent Center Square/Hudson–Park Historic District on the west.

It continues north two blocks, now bordering the Washington Avenue Corridor Historic District, to the Elk Street intersection. Here it runs past Cathedral of All Saints and the back of the State Education Department building to the South Hawk Street intersection. The boundary turns north along the continuation of South Hawk and then turns east again to Columbia Street at the entrance to the top deck of a large parking garage in nearby Sheridan Hollow.

At the Eagle Street junction, it turns north to the rear lot line of a building on that side of the street, then along its east line to the rear lines of the rowhouses along Columbia Street all the way to Chapel Street. It follows that street south back to Columbia, and turns east again all the way to Lodge Street, again sharing a boundary, this time with the Downtown Albany Historic District.

Map of the district

Just before reaching St. Mary's Church, at Steuben Street, the line turns west again, then south, between the New York State Court of Appeals Building and the parking lot behind it. Crossing Pine Street it jogs slightly westward, then turns south and west to Eagle Street, around the back of City Hall. From there it turns south in the middle of Eagle Street and returns to the southeast corner.

The terrain slopes gently eastward, toward the nearby Hudson River, becoming slightly steeper in the eastern portion of the district. On the north it drops off more abruptly into Sheridan Hollow.

Much of the southern portion of the district is open space. East and West Capitol parks flank that building. To its northeast, on the block between Elk, Eagle, Hawk and Washington, is one large park that is actually two: Lafayette Park, owned by the state, on the west and city-owned Academy Park on the east. In between them on the north side is the former Albany Academy building, now the main offices of the Albany City School District.

The large government buildings around the park were, like the state capitol, built in the late 19th century. Their architectural styles vary from the capitol's mix of Second Empire and French Renaissance Revival to the Classical Revival stylings of the Court of Appeals and Education Department building. The cathedral adds some Gothic Revival to the mix. The residential areas in the north primarily have two-story brick townhouses dating to the late 19th and early 20th centuries. There are 35 buildings in the district; all but three are contributing properties

== History ==
The district has an early period corresponding roughly to the 19th century, in which it was noted for the residences of socially prominent residents and politicians. After the completion of the current capitol building at century's end, it began to be dominated by large government buildings, with the open space, including the park that gives the district its name, coming into place in the early decades of the new century.

=== 1809–1899: Elk Street and residences ===
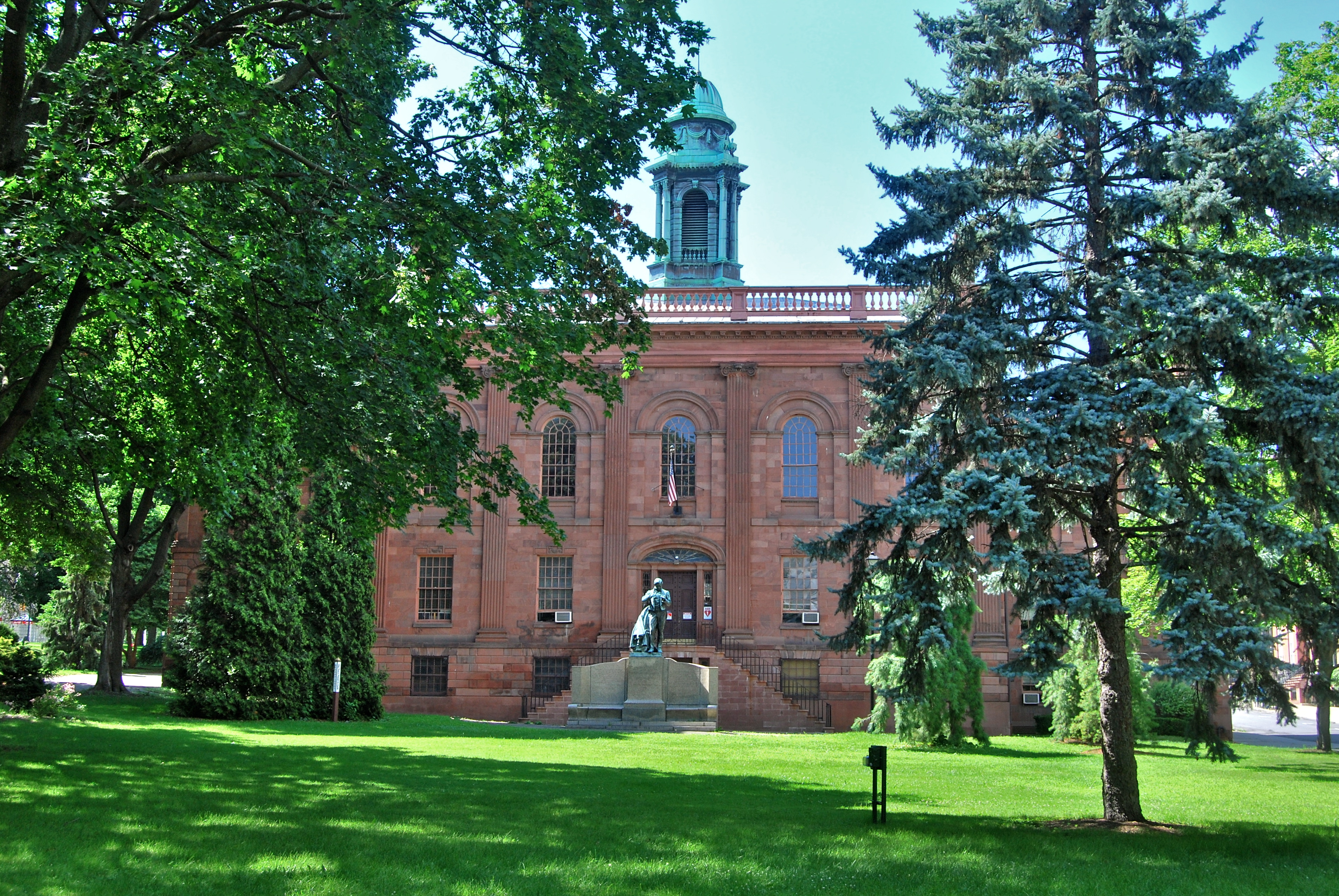
Original Albany Academy building

The neighborhood has been home to the centers of power since it was established. In 1809, 12 years after Albany was permanently designated New York's state capital at the end of the 18th century, the first state capitol building in the city was erected on a site adjacent to the location of the current building. The city government used the building as well for meetings and office space. Philip Hooker's original Albany Academy building, the oldest extant building in the district, was built 1815–17.

In the academy building, a dozen years later, one of the school's professors, Joseph Henry, conducted experiments with electricity that proved the existence of inductance and created the first functional electromagnet. For several years in the early 1830s he demonstrated the practical effects of this discovery to his classes by using a magnet to ring a bell at the end of a wire run around the room. Not only was this the prototype for the electric doorbell, it has been considered an important step on the road to the invention of the telegraph two decades later.

In 1832, the city government decided it needed its own city hall, and Hooker provided a domed marble Greek Revival building on the present site, which had already been designated for future development as a public square. The next year, the two acres (8,100 m^{2}) on the east of the Academy building were formally laid out as Academy Park. It was encircled by an iron fence similar to that which Hooker had designed for nearby Capitol Park. Elk and Columbia streets were the center of development, primarily residential, in the district during this era. On the former, the houses closest to the park, Nos. 2 through 7, were built between 1827 and 1833, among them some considered Albany's finest Greek Revival houses. Columbia Street, where Henry made his home at 107, was developed more modestly.

Because of its proximity to the capitol, Elk Street was often a preferred residence of the state's governors during this era, since New York did not erect its governor's mansion until later in the 19th century. William L. Marcy lived at 2 Elk Street during his first term, and Hamilton Fish made 21 Elk his home after he was elected in 1848. Daniel Barnard, a congressman and later ambassador to Germany, lived at 25 Elk Street and may have owned 1 Elk Street (since demolished). Three governors—Enos T. Throop, Washington Hunt and Horatio Seymour—rented the building from him during their tenure in office.

Martin van Buren, a state senator and New York's Attorney General before he became U.S. President, owned 4 Elk Street and lived there for some of the time he was not serving in the latter post. While he was, it was occupied by his son Smith Thompson and his wife, Ellen King James. Among the visitors who came to the house in the later years was Ellen's young nephew Henry. Later in his life, when he had become an accomplished novelist, he wrote that Elk Street had always seemed to him "vaguely portentous, as though beasts of the forests not fully exorcised."

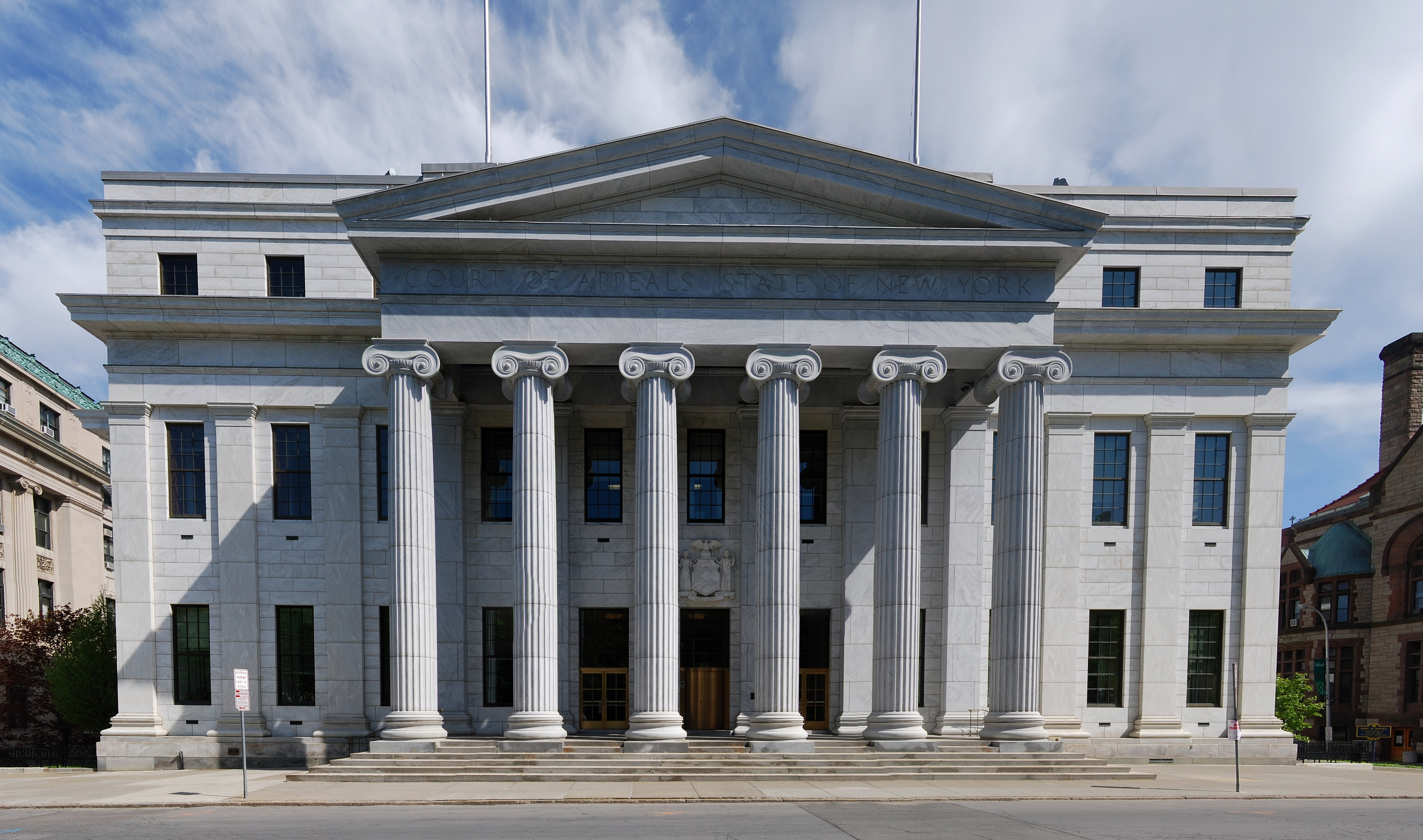
The Court of Appeals building

The first of the large buildings, mostly governmental edifices, that dominate the district today, the New York State Court of Appeals Building, was designed in 1835 and opened in 1842. Originally "State Hall", housing a number of other state offices before the court moved in following its 1847 creation, Henry Rector's neoclassical structure used all three orders in its design. It was considered one of the finest government buildings of its era. Four years later, 17 Elk Street, the grandest house yet built on that street, was sold to John V. L. Pruyn, an industrialist who later served in the state senate and U.S. House. It was expanded to the east in 1858.

After the Civil War, during which a temporary structure was set up in Academy Park as the Army Relief Bazaar to raise money for medical supplies, this change accelerated further with the beginning of construction of the new capitol. Marcus T. Reynolds, an architect who worked in the city through the 1930s, was born at 98 Columbia Street in 1869 and lived there both as a child and an old man. In 1880, Hooker's 1832 City Hall burned down. Henry Hobson Richardson, then in Albany working on the state capitol, designed the current building to replace it, and it was soon completed, in part because the budget and cost overruns did not allow for an interior to match Richardson's ornate Romanesque exterior.

In the decade after the war, Elk Street continued to be a residential neighborhood. Reflecting the Gilded Age, most of those who made their homes there were not politicians but some of the city's newly wealthy industrialists. The park was neglected during this time—Huybertie Pruyn, who lived in the area as a child during the 1870s and '80s, recalls it as a "wretchedly kept place". It had only one light in the center, was locked at 10 p.m. every night, and even so children were warned not to go into it after dark.

The Rev. William Croswell Doane had been appointed bishop of the Episcopal Diocese of Albany in 1867. He lived at 29 Elk Street, and presided over the construction of Cathedral of All Saints, completed in 1888. The young architect Robert W. Gibson won the commission over Richardson with his Gothic Revival design. Doane's original plan was for the block on which the cathedral was located to be an entire campus with a school, hospital and convent, a "mother church" for the diocese, similar to some Anglican cathedrals in England. He was unable to persuade the church's trustees to spend the additional money, which would have an effect on the building later.

The same year, the thousand-foot (300 m) Hawk Street Viaduct was built, connecting the neighborhoods north of Sheridan Hollow, now home to many of the workers in the industrialized city, with the Lafayette Park area. Since dismantled, it is believed to have been the first cantilevered arch bridge in the world, designed by former state engineer Elnathan Sweet. A segment of the iron railing and its south abutment remain, as contributing properties.

Elk Street remained an address known for its high style. In 1897, newly elected Lieutenant Governor Timothy L. Woodruff, who would serve three governors in that position, moved into 5 Elk Street. Albany society took immediate notice of his penchant for the latest clothing, his fine horses, and his English coachman, who had most recently worked for Lilly Langtry, Prince Edward's mistress.

In 1899, the new state capitol was finally finished. With government so firmly established in the area, some of the old houses nearby began to be adapted into office space for institutions that desired the proximity to the state's elected officials, or subdivided into smaller living spaces. A fire insurers' organization converted 1–2 Columbia Place, including one of the buildings that had served as sculptor Erastus Dow Palmer's studio in the middle of the century, into its offices. Similarly, 105–107 Columbia Street became an apartment building.

=== 1900–present: New Capitol, government buildings and parks ===
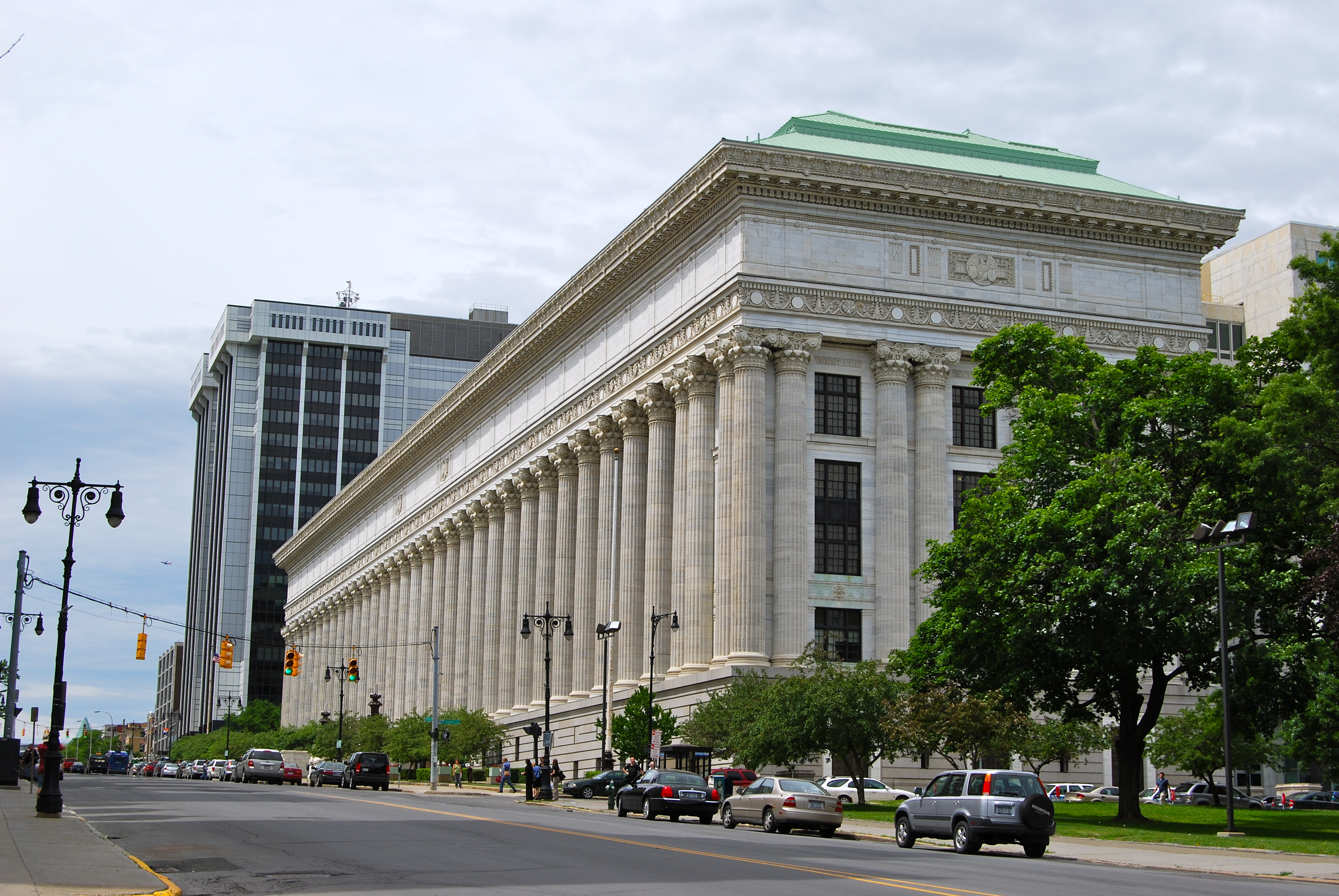
The State Education Department Building

The early 20th century significantly transformed the district. First, two more large government buildings were added. In 1906 Andrew Sloan Draper, first commissioner of the state's State Education Department (SED), wanted to move his agency into space of its own near the capitol along with the state library and museum. He considered the block on which Cathedral of All Saints stood to be the ideal location; however, the cathedral still owned some of the land and his approaches to the Doane, who had not abandoned his mother church plan, led to animosity between the two. While the bishop was traveling overseas, Draper used his political influence to have the state buy all the remaining land on the block. Doane, forced to abandon his longtime plan, succeeded in getting the legislature to limit the SED building to two stories, but Draper retaliated by making sure that those two stories, on Henry Hornbostel's colonnaded marble Beaux-Arts structure were as tall as possible, blocking the cathedral off from the rest of the city.

While it was being built, the district would be home for two years to another resident later to become prominent, future president Franklin Delano Roosevelt. He lived in 4 Elk Street from 1910 to 1912 while serving as a state senator. Other houses nearby, and on Columbia, were being renovated, usually by Marcus T. Reynolds. In 1912, the Education Department building was completed, followed four years later by Albany County's new courthouse and office building next to the Court of Appeals.

During the time the district was preparing to receive its distinguishing feature. Starting in 1908, the block between Academy Park and Hawk Street was cleared to create Lafayette Park, named for the Marquis de Lafayette, who had stayed in Albany during 1778 and visited the city in the 1820s. In the process more than 30 houses were demolished, including those of Palmer and writer Leonard Kip. With the space opening up, more public statuary was erected. Daniel Chester French arranged for John Quincy Adams Ward's memorial sculpture to Union Army General Phillip Sheridan, an Albany native, to be posthumously placed on a pedestal east of the capitol designed by Lincoln Memorial architect Henry Bacon. In 1925, a J. Massey Rhind statue of another Albany military man, Revolutionary War General Phillip Schuyler, went up in front of City Hall. It was followed two years later by one of Joseph Henry, sculpted by John Flanagan, in front of the Albany Academy.

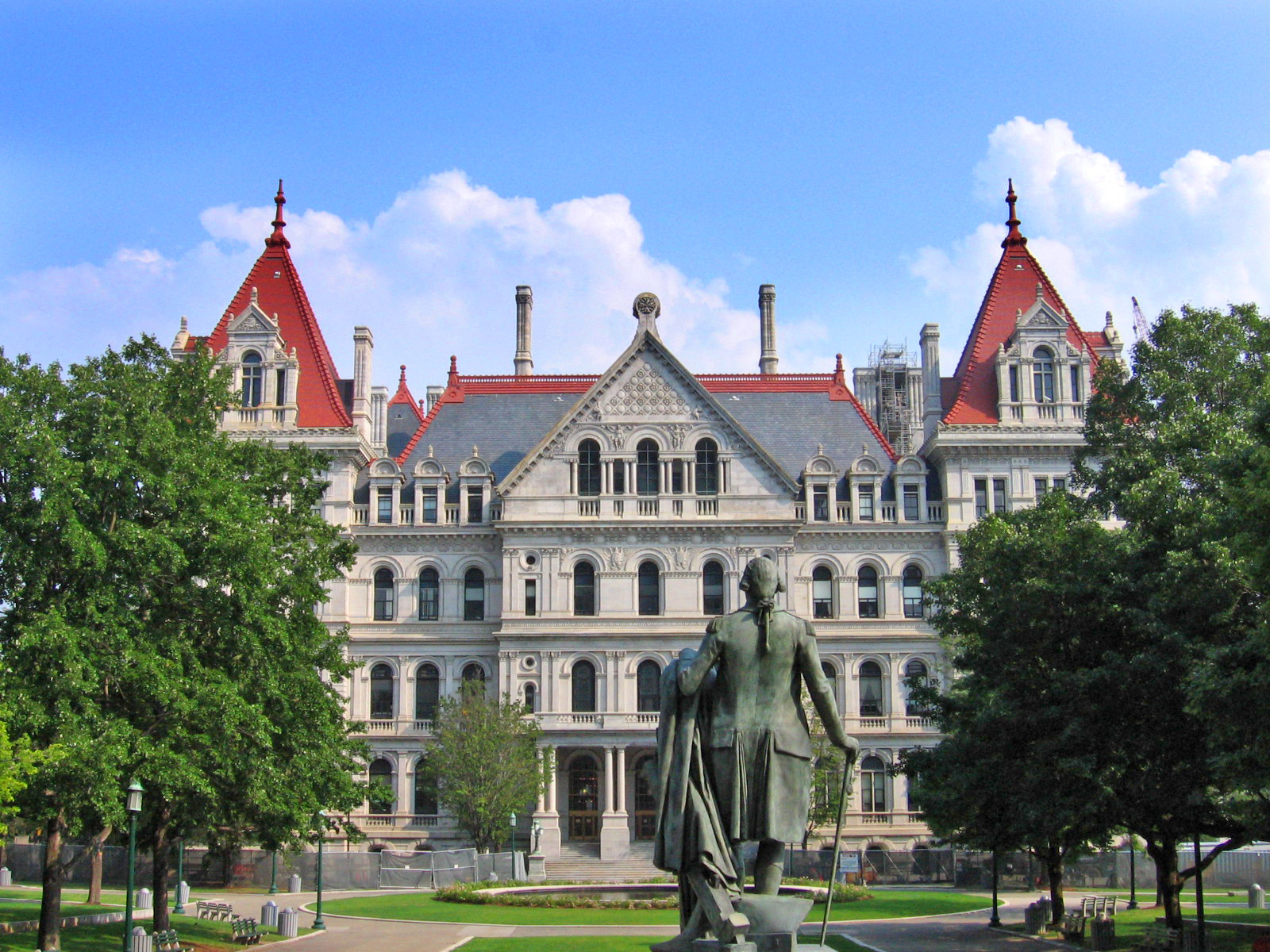
Statue of Washington in West Capitol Park

West Capitol Park was expanded threefold from a modest plan submitted by the sons of Frederick Law Olmsted in 1898. In keeping with the ideals of the contemporary City Beautiful movement, it was reimagined as a "court of honor", surrounded by the Capitol, SED building and the newer Alfred E. Smith Building, towering over the older ones at the park's west side. Ideas by former state architects Franklin B. Ware and Lewis Pilcher were also incorporated. When it opened in 1930 it framed the capitol's west facade with a tree-lined entrance mall. A replica of Jean-Antoine Houdon's statue of George Washington, displayed in the rotunda of the Virginia State Capitol, was installed in the park in 1932 to commemorate the first president's bicentennial.

The changes in the neighborhood were reflected in its building use. In 1930, the academy moved out of the building it had outgrown; after the city bought it eventually became the offices of the Albany City School District. Reynolds, in one of his final projects, supervised the renovation of the interior, a New Deal project funded by the Public Works Administration. The Pruyns had moved out of 17 Elk Street around 1910; their house eventually became the state headquarters of the Independent Order of Odd Fellows. They were followed by most of the other socially prominent families who had called Elk home. The house at 4, where the young Henry James had visited his aunt almost a century before, likewise became home to another fraternal organization, the Moose International.

Through the middle of the century the district remained stable, with no significant new buildings, demolitions or other changes. That began to change in the late 1960s as urban renewal touched Albany, and the modernist towers of Empire State Plaza rose to the south, dwarfing the older government buildings in the district. Preservation efforts grew. Daniel Barnard's old house at 1 Elk Street was demolished in 1969. At the corner of Elk and Eagle, activists were able to save the facades of three townhouses which were otherwise to have been demolished for another modernist building, James Stewart Polshek's New York Law Center, which they serve to screen from the street.

The following year, 1970, the Hawk Street viaduct was dismantled. Only its south abutment and a portion of its handrail were left. As Empire State Plaza neared completion in the late 1970s, the state library and museum left the SED building for larger, dedicated space of their own built within the new complex.

In 1986, a memorial to Albany County's dead and missing from the Vietnam War was commissioned for Lafayette Park. Sculptor Merlin Szosz produced a stele in the classical Greek mode, made of pink Brazilian granite and adorned with the names of those casualties, plus a relief of a soldier holding his fallen comrade amid Southeast Asian vegetation. It is set amid four gas lanterns shaped like lotuses and a circle of bronze benches. It was installed and dedicated in 1992.

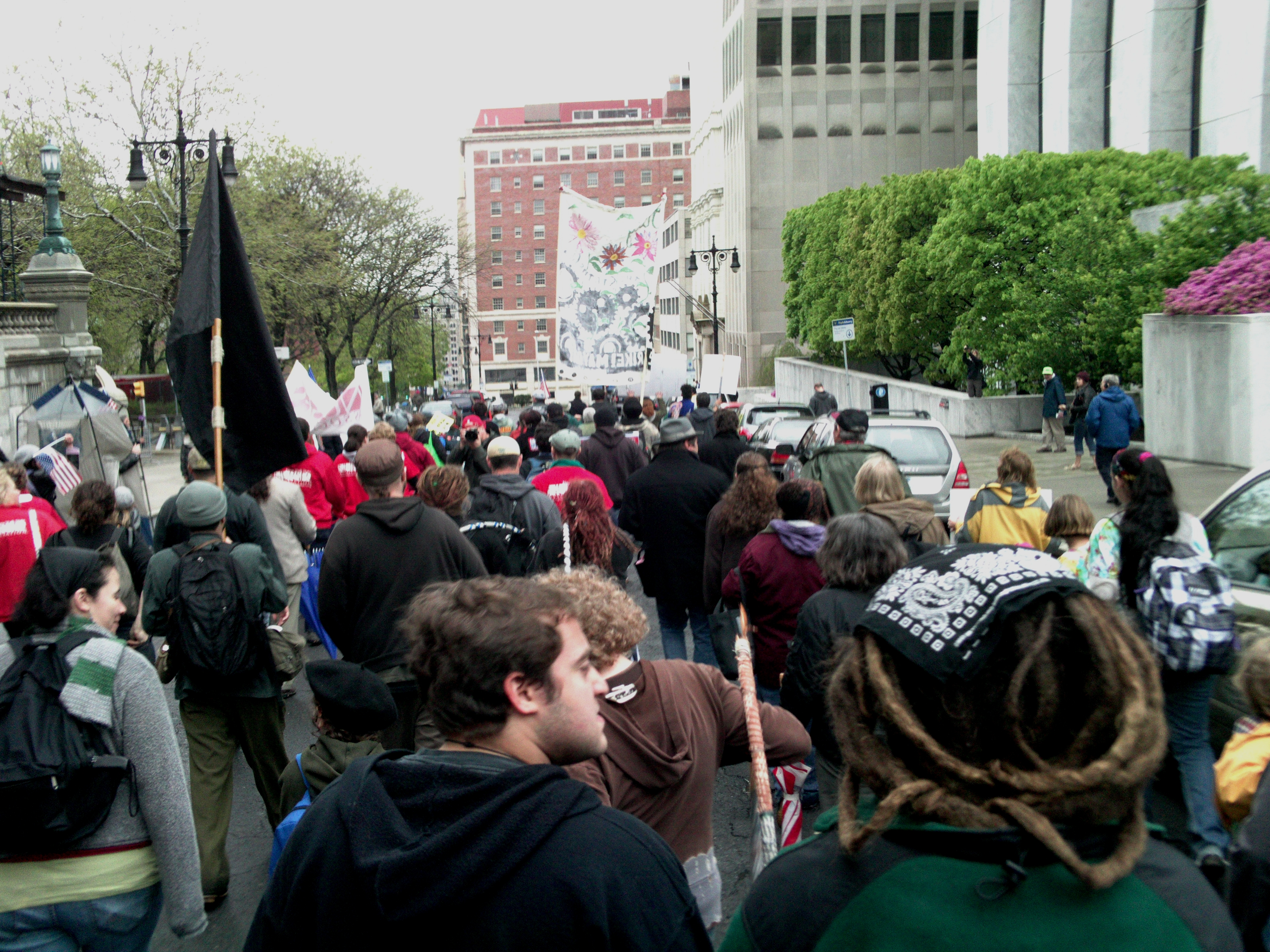
Occupy Albany's 2012 May Day march along State Street

Two decades later, the social turmoil that accompanied the Vietnam War on the home front echoed through the park anew. In October 2011, protesters inspired by Occupy Wall Street in Manhattan set up Occupy Albany, a tent encampment in the parks, to call attention to rising socioeconomic inequality during the Great Recession as their fellow activists downstate had. The state originally instituted a curfew of 11 p.m. for Lafayette Park in order to force them to leave, and police cited several of them for violating it. These plans failed when David Soares, the county district attorney, dropped the charges and city officials issued the group a permit to stay in Academy Park, which was under its jurisdiction and not the state's, in return for its cleanup efforts and limitations on its presence. Occupy Albany stayed in the park for another 15 days before the city evicted it as winter came on. The group continues to hold rallies and events in the parks.

== Significant contributing properties ==
Six buildings in the district are individually listed on the National Register in addition to being contributing properties to the district. They include the cathedral and all government buildings save the county courthouse. One of those government buildings, the state capitol, is further designated a National Historic Landmark. There are still others that are noteworthy within the context of the district.

=== National Historic Landmark ===
State Capitol from southwest

- New York State Capitol, State Street: One of the last state capitol buildings in the nation to be located in an urban center when it was finished in 1899 after a 32-year construction period plagued by delays, it is also one of 11 that are not domed. Original architect Thomas Fuller had, in fact, designed a domed Renaissance Revival building, but he was forced off the project due to cost overruns in building the first three stories, and it was later left to various other architects, including Henry Hobson Richardson, to finish the 220-foot (67 m) structure in the Romanesque Revival mode, and as a result of this discontinuity it is often referred to as "a building at war with itself."

=== National Register of Historic Places ===
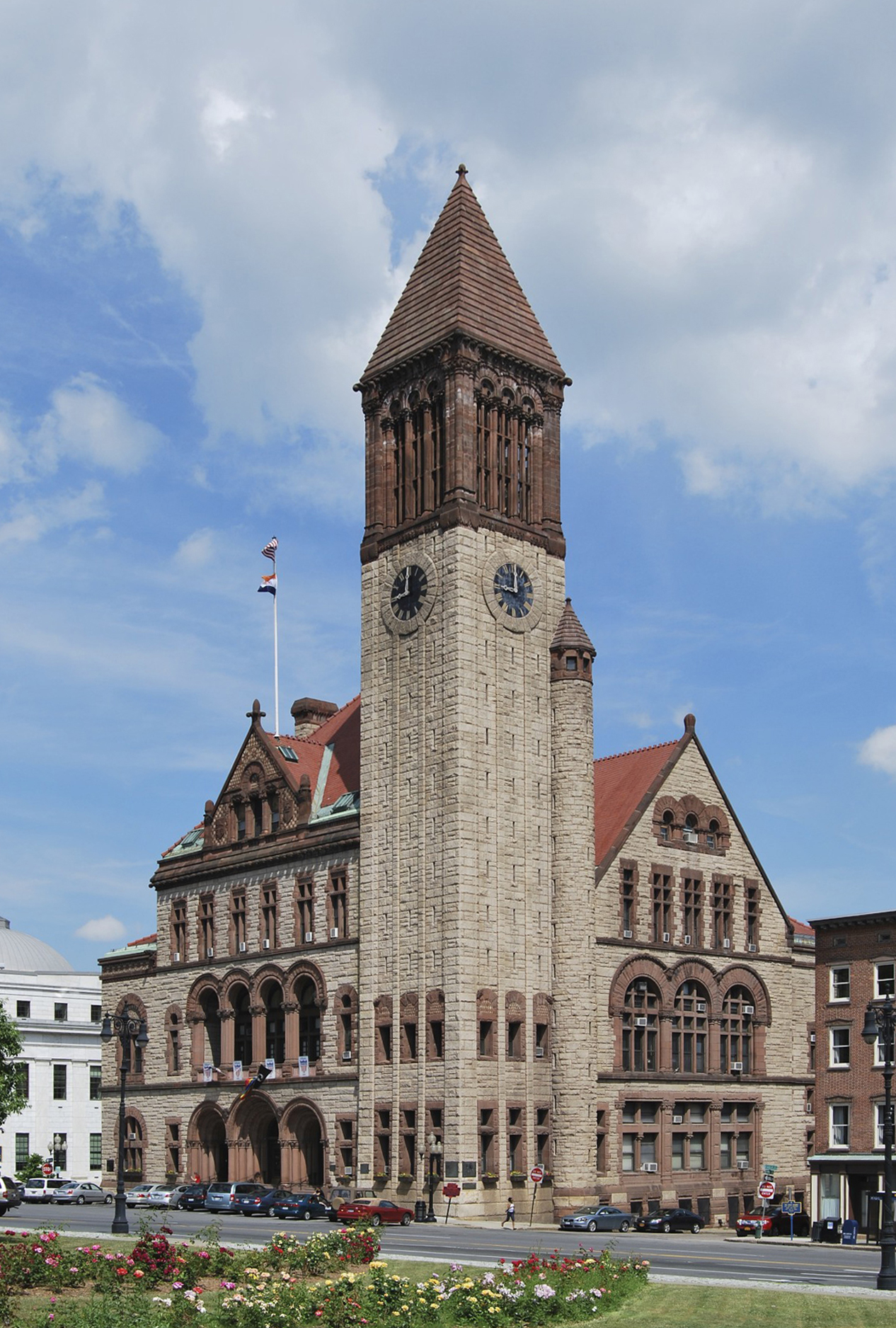
Albany City Hall

- Albany City Hall, 24 Eagle Street: Henry Hobson Richardson designed the fourth building to house Albany's government in 1880 when its 1832 predecessor was destroyed by fire. The granite building is considered one of his finest works, although he left the interior to later architects, including Marcus T. Reynolds. In 1927 its 202-foot (62 m) tower was equipped with the first municipal carillon in America.
- Cathedral of All Saints, 62 South Swan Street: Richardson lost the contest to design this 1884 structure to the then relatively unknown Robert W. Gibson, who had, unlike Richardson, followed the design specifications. The Gothic Revival stone and brick structure was completed four years later. William Croswell Doane, bishop of the Episcopal Diocese of Albany, had meant it to be the center of a "mother church" complex similar to those in some English diocesan seats, but the completion of the SED building two decades later made those plans impossible. Even the cathedral itself remains incomplete, with two foundations for higher rear spires in its rear.
- Old Albany Academy Building, Academy Park: Philip Hooker's 1815 stone neoclassical design for the school is the oldest civic building in the city, and the less altered of his two remaining non-residential buildings. Joseph Henry would later demonstrate the existence of electromagnetism in experiments there, and the building was named for him. It has been home to the Albany City School District since 1930.
- New York Court of Appeals Building, 20 Eagle Street: Built originally in 1842 as State Hall, this late Greek Revival structure with thick load-bearing walls housed several other government offices in addition to the state's highest court. Its decoration features all three classical orders.
- New York State Education Department Building, 89 Washington Avenue: This monumental 1912 Classical Revival stone building, with its colonnade running the length of the block, was the first building in America to house a state government's education agency. Commissioner Andrew Sloan Draper made sure the two stories Doane had persuaded the legislature to limit the building to were nevertheless high enough to obstruct the view of All Saints from the rest of the city. Originally it also housed the state library and museum until they moved to separate quarters in the 1970s.

=== Others ===
- 83 and 85 Columbia Street: These two pre-Civil War townhouses have unusual bowed facades.
- 98 Columbia Street: The residence of architect Marcus T. Reynolds during his earliest and latest years. He grew up here, raised by his father and aunt after his mother died while he was very young. After his professional success, he bought the house and remodeled it.
- 99 Columbia Street: Local cabinetmaker John Meads built what is probably another Hooker design in 1829. While its original concave entrance has been moved to the Albany Institute of History & Art, Meads' interior carvings remain.
- 107 Columbia Street: Joseph Henry lived here while he was teaching and experimenting at the Albany Academy. His house was actually one of the two Federal style buildings that have since been combined.
- 2 Elk Street: Several years after this 1827 townhouse was completed, Governor William L. Marcy made it his official residence. It is believed to have been designed by Hooker, since it complements the Academy building across the street. Congressman Rufus H. King lived there later in the 19th century.
- 4 Elk Street: Built around the same time as its neighbor, this townhouse was owned by, and at times home to, Martin van Buren; his son and daughter-in-law lived there after his presidency. It was visited by her nephew, the young Henry James; later it was the home of Franklin D. Roosevelt for one of his terms in the State Senate.
- 6 Elk Street: When this red brick house was built in 1834, it was one of the largest on the street and one of Albany's best Greek Revival houses. William Patterson Van Rensselaer, a descendant of one of colonial Albany's wealthiest and most prominent families, built it upon his marriage. Later it would serve as the deanery for the cathedral.
- 17 Elk Street: This ornate Gothic Revival townhouse displaced 6 and 7 Elk as the grandest on the block when it was finished in 1845. Builder John V. L. Pruyn was a consolidator of the New York Central Railroad and later a state senator, U.S. Representative, regent of the University of the State of New York.
- 21 Elk Street: Orr and Cunningham, the builders of Pruyn's house, are considered to have surpassed it with this one, built in 1845 for John Adams Dix. It is unlikely however that he lived there for any length of time since he was elected to the U.S. Senate by the legislature later that year in a special election. Pruyn lived there for a while instead, and Hamilton Fish made it his residence during his term as governor.
- 25 Elk Street: Daniel D. Barnard, an assemblyman, Congressman, and later ambassador to Prussia lived here between the 1830s and 1850s. He also owned the now-demolished 1 Elk Street, which he rented to several other politicians, including three governors.
- 29 Elk Street: A striking house of brick laid in Flemish bond, with marble Doric columns on the first floor topped by ionic ones on the second, this was the residence of Episcopal bishop William Croswell Doane from his appointment in 1869 to his death four decades later. It continued to be the residence of subsequent bishops through the 1960s.
- Albany County Courthouse, 16 Eagle Street: The last of the large government buildings in the district to be erected, this 1910s granite and limestone Classical Revival design was meant to be sympathetic with the Court of Appeals building next door, featuring the same combination of Doric columns at the lower levels and Ionic columns above. Its intricate ornamentation extends to its bronze doors and cast iron exterior lamps with an acanthus motif. Inside it is centered around a two-story light court with marble Doric and Ionic columns and a vaulted ceiling of stained glass.
- Hawk Street Viaduct Abutment and Railing, North Hawk Street: These are all that remains of the Hawk Street Viaduct, believed to have been the first cantilevered arch bridge when it was built in 1888 to carry pedestrians over Sheridan Hollow to and from the working-class neighborhoods north of downtown. It was dismantled in 1970.

== Parks ==
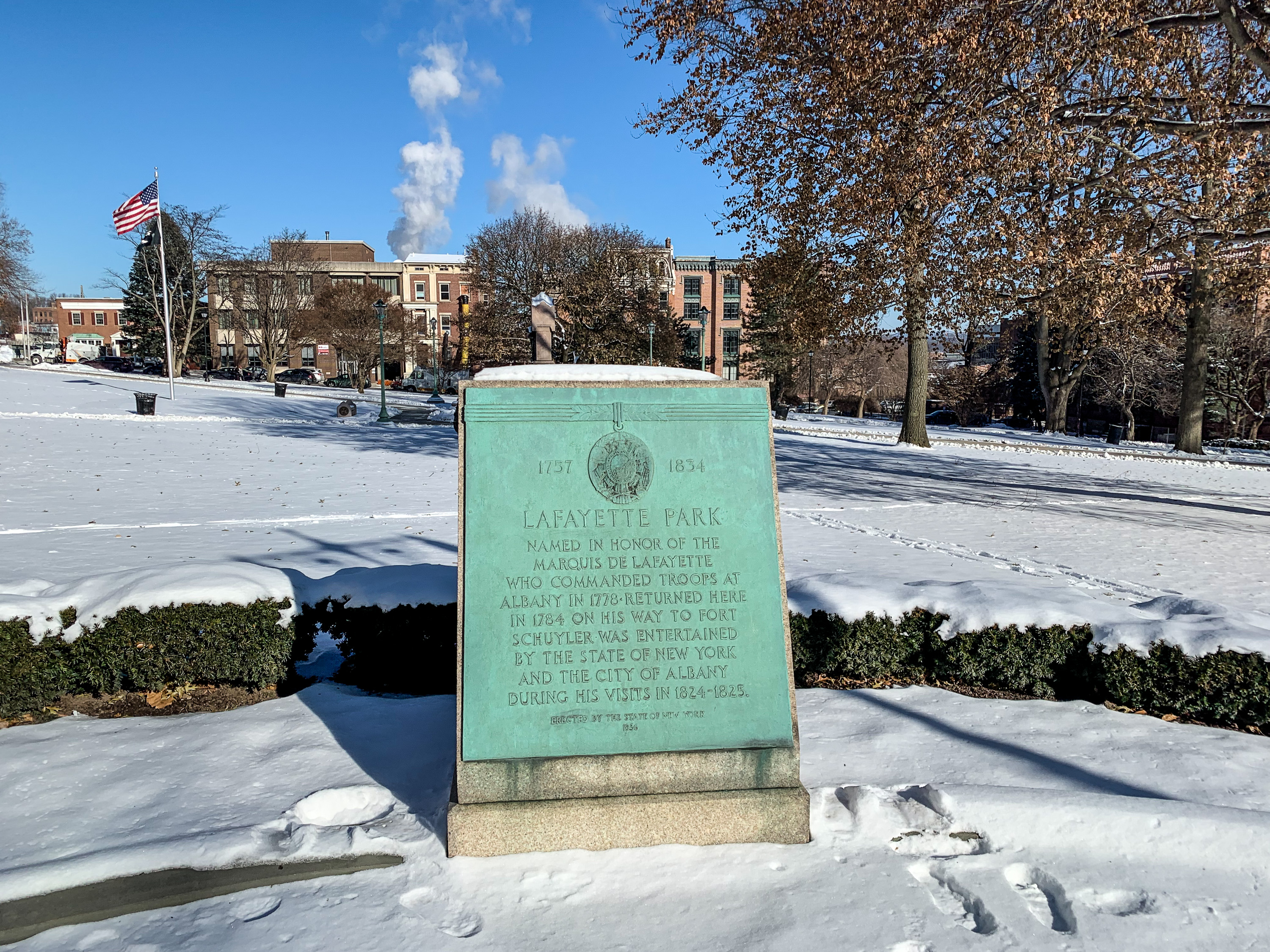
Plaque in Lafayette Park

- Academy Park: The first park in the district was created in 1833 and named for the nearby school. In its two acres (8,100 m^{2}) is a statute of Joseph Henry, commemorating his discovery of electromagnetism in the nearby building.
- East Capitol Park: A statute of Civil War general Phillip Sheridan, who lived in Albany as a boy, stands between Eagle Street and the main steps of the state capitol building. Daniel Chester French lobbied to have it placed here after sculptor John Quincy Adams Ward's death.
- Lafayette Park: The larger portion of land west of the Academy building was a developed block until the 1920s. The resulting park was named in honor of the Marquis de Lafayette, who lived in the city during 1778 and returned during his 1824 visit.
- West Capitol Park: A modest 1898 design by the sons of legendary park designer Frederick Law Olmsted was eventually expanded to its present size in the 1930s by several other architects in an attempt to create one of the "courts of honor" favored by the City Beautiful movement. Its statue is a replica of Jean-Antoine Houdon's George Washington, facing the capitol, placed to commemorate the bicentennial of his birth.

== See also ==
- Architecture of Albany, New York
- National Register of Historic Places listings in Albany, New York
