= Clayton A. Bouton High School =

Location
- 432 New Salem Rd; Voorheesville, (Albany County), New York 12186; United States; 42.6414°N 73.9642°W

Information
- School type: Public school (government funded), high school
- School district: Voorheesville Central School District
- NCES District ID: 3629670
- Superintendent: Frank Macri
- CEEB code: 335740
- NCES School ID: 362967003997
- Principal: Lisa Cardillo
- Teaching staff: 29.10 (on an FTE basis)
- Grades: 9–12
- Enrollment: 338 (2023-2024)
- Student to teacher ratio: 11.62
- Campus: Rural: Fringe
- Colors: Purple and gold
- Mascot: Blackbirds
- Rival: Watervliet Junior-Senior High School

Clayton A. Bouton High School is a public high school located in Voorheesville, Albany County, New York, U.S.A., and is the only high school operated by the Voorheesville Central School District.

== Athletics ==
Athletics at Voorheesville high school include boys and girls tennis, cross country, soccer, track, basketball, swimming (teamed together with neighboring Guilderland High School), and volleyball. Single sex sports include softball, baseball, and football. Co-ed sports are cheerleading, wrestling, bowling, and golf. Their mascot is the Blackbird and they claim three NYSPHSAA titles with Boys Soccer in 1990, and Girls Basketball in 1998 and 2002.

The 1982-83 boys basketball team had an undefeated regular season in the Colonial Council, went on to win two playoff games at the Glens Falls Civic Center, and eventually fell to Wyandanch High School (Long Island) in the Division II state semifinals at Marist College. The team finished the season at 26-1, as the most successful boys basketball team in school history, playing in front of sold-out crowds at home and on the road, due to a strong following of students and parents.

In the 2002–2003 school year a brand new gymnasium was opened that seats roughly 500 with the unique aspect of bleachers only on the south side of the gymnasium. That fall also saw brand new soccer and football fields opened along with the school's first running track. The football field was dedicated to former coach and player Tom Buckley who died in the mid-1980s. Just a quarter mile down Route 85 A lie additional practice soccer fields as well as another baseball field, collectively known as the satellite fields. Voorheesville's student body is very active in supporting its teams despite its relatively small numbers. The 2014-2015 Voorheesville Football team went undefeated for the first time in 48 years in the regular season. The "Birdcage" is often found at boys basketball games loudly supporting the team. Voorheesville competes in Classes B, CC, C, and D depending on the sport.

== Clubs ==
Clayton A. Bouton offers a variety of clubs and activities including Model United Nations, Ski Club, Mock Trial, SADD, National History Club, Student Government, Torch (yearbook), The Helderbarker (school newspaper), Builders Club (affiliated with the New Scotland Kiwanis), Speech and Debate Club, Dungeons and Dragons Club, and National Honor Society. The fine arts department has been widely recognized, with NYSSMA award winning band and chorus groups. The school also boasts a strong tradition in Drama Club; the Voorheesville Dionysians present a musical in the spring. In 2022, the Drama Club's performance was nominated by Proctor's Theatre in Schenectady for Best High School Musical. Famous alumnae include actress Yvonne Perry, Joe Kraemer (composer) and pop singer Nikki Cleary.

== Notable alumni ==
- David B. Shear, class of 1971. Assistant Secretary of Defense for Asian and Pacific Security Affairs 2014-2016 and United States Ambassador to Vietnam 2011-2014.
