= Voorheesville Central School District =

School district in the U.S. state of New York

Location
- Voorheesville, New York United States

District information
- Type: Public
- Grades: K–12
- Superintendent: Frank Macri
- Schools: 3
- Budget: ▲$30,078,491

Students and staff
- Students: 1,244
- Teachers: 95
- District mascot: Blackbirds

Other information
- Website: voorheesville.org

Voorheesville Central School District (VCSD) is a school district in Albany County, New York. As of the 2021–2022 school year, the district served 1,244 K–12 students residing in the towns of Berne, Guilderland, and New Scotland. The district is made up of 3 schools.

The district has two full-time student counselors on staff. All teachers are licensed. The student-teacher ratio is 12.1 (state average is 13.1).

== Schools ==
The district consists of one elementary school (grades K–5), one middle school (grades 6–8), and one high school (grades 9–12).

- Voorheesville Elementary School
- Voorheesville Middle School
- Clayton A. Bouton High School

== Student demographics ==
Per US News, 9.9% of students are on free or reduced price lunch plans.

Student Demographics - Race
Race	% of Student Body Population
White	87.4%
Black	0.9%
Asian or Asian/Pacific Islander	2.7%
Hispanic/Latino	4.2%
American Indian or Alaska Native	0.0%
Native Hawaiian or other Pacific Islander	0.2%

Student Demographics - Gender
Gender	% of Student Body Population
Male	50%
Female	50%

Data is based on the 2020-2021 and 2021-2022 school years.

== Student performance ==
Per US News, the following statistics were available regarding student proficiency testing:

- Elementary: 62% of elementary students tested at or above proficient level for reading, 64% tested at or above that level for math.
- Middle: 76% of middle school students tested at or above the proficient level for reading, and 63% tested at or above that level for math.
- High: 92% of high school students tested at or above the proficient level for reading, and 91% tested at or above that level for math.

US News assigned a 50.8 score for college readiness. The score is a 0-100 index value reflecting the extent 12th graders took AP and IB exams and scored 3 or higher for AP; 4 or higher for IB.

Data is based on the 2020-2021 and 2021-2022 school years.

== Finances (2021-2022) ==
- 2021-2022 Revenue: $26,884,000; 67.7% local government, 29.6% state government, 2.8% federal government.
- Revenue per student: $22,553 per student.
- 2021-2022 Expenses: $23,603,000; $16.1 million for instruction, $7.1 million for support services, $0.5 million on other related spending.
- Expenses per student: $18,973 per student.

Data is based on the 2020-2021 and 2021-2022 school years.
