= Berne-Knox-Westerlo Secondary School =

Berne-Knox-Westerlo Junior-Senior High School

Location
- 1738 Helderberg Trail; Berne, (Albany County), New York 12023; United States
- Coordinates: 42.626900°N 74.145300°W

Information
- School type: Public school (government funded), high school
- School district: Berne-Knox-Westerlo Central School District
- NCES District ID: 3604650
- Superintendent: Timothy Mundell
- CEEB code: 330415
- NCES School ID: 360465000208
- Principal: Mark Pitterson
- Teaching staff: 35.52 (on an FTE basis)
- Grades: 6–12; Ungraded
- Enrollment: 311 (2024-2025 school year)
  - Grade 6
  - Grade 7: 58
  - Grade 8: 50
  - Grade 9: 50
  - Grade 10: 56
  - Grade 11: 44
  - Grade 12: 53
  - Ungraded: 7
- Student to teacher ratio: 8.76
- Campus: Rural: Distant
- Colors: Maroon and Gold
- Mascot: Bulldogs

Berne-Knox-Westerlo Junior-Senior High School is a public high school located in Berne, Albany County, New York, U.S.A., and is the only high school operated by the Berne-Knox-Westerlo Central School District.

In March 2025, Berne-Knox-Westerlo's varsity boys' basketball team concluded an undefeated season by winning the NYSPHSAA championship.
