= Berne-Knox-Westerlo Central School District =

School district in New York, United States

Berne-Knox-Westerlo Central School District is a school district headquartered in Berne, New York. It includes BKW Elementary School and BKW Junior-Senior High School.

Most of the district is in Albany County. There, it includes all or portions of the following towns: most of Berne and Knox, much of Westerlo, and portions of New Scotland and Rensselaerville. A portion of the district is in Schoharie County, with sections in the towns of Middleburgh and Wright.

== History ==
Paul Dorward became the superintendent in 2010.

In 2017, the district put up two different bond proposals on the ballot.
