= Hudson City School District (New York) =

School district in New York, United States

Hudson City School District is a school district in Hudson, New York, U.S.A.

It operates the following schools:

- Hudson High School
- Hudson Junior High School
- Montgomery C. Smith Elementary School
- John L. Edwards Primary School (building closed)
- Greenport Elementary School (building closed and for sale)
- Alternative Learning Program (closed due to budget cuts and closure of Greenport)
