= Hudson High School (New York) =

Location
- 215 Harry Howard Avenue; Hudson, New York 12534; United States
- Coordinates: 42.25989°N 73.772206°W

Information
- Type: Public
- School district: Hudson City School District (New York)
- Principal: Derek Reardon
- Staff: 41.48 (FTE)
- Grades: 9-12
- Enrollment: 462 (2023–2024)
- Student to teacher ratio: 11.14
- Campus type: Urban
- Colors: Blue, gold, and white
- Athletics: Baseball, basketball, cheerleading, cross country, football, golf, soccer, softball, swimming, tennis, track, volleyball
- Athletics conference: Patroon Conference
- Mascot: Bluehawk
- Website: www.hudsoncsd.org/hudson-senior-high-school/

Hudson High School is a high school in Hudson, New York, United States. It is operated by the Hudson City School District.
