= Greenville High School (New York) =

Location
- 4976 State Route 81; Greenville, New York 12083; United States; 42°25′5.88″N 74°1′37.2″W

Information
- Type: Public
- School district: Greenville Central School District
- NCES District ID: 3612870
- Superintendent: Tammy Sutherland
- NCES School ID: 361287001056
- Principal: Matthew Ward
- Teaching staff: 37.64 (on an FTE basis)
- Grades: 9-12
- Gender: Co-ed
- Enrollment: 339 (2024-2025)
- Student to teacher ratio: 9.01
- Campus: Rural: Distant
- Colors: Maroon and White
- Mascot: Spartans
- Yearbook: Pioneer
- Website: www.greenville.k12.ny.us/o/ghs

Greenville High School is a public high school located in Greenville, Greene County, New York, U.S.A., and is the only high school operated by the Greenville Central School District.
