= City School District of Albany =

School district in the U.S. state of New York

Location
- Albany, New York United States

District information
- Type: Public
- Grades: Pre-kindergarten, K-12, Incarcerated Youth High School, Adult Evening High School
- Established: 1830
- Superintendent: Joseph Hochreiter
- Governing agency: New York State Education Department
- Schools: 17
- Budget: ▲US$234 million

Students and staff
- Students: 10,068

Other information
- Unions: NYSUT, Albany Public School Teachers Association
- Website: www.albanyschools.org

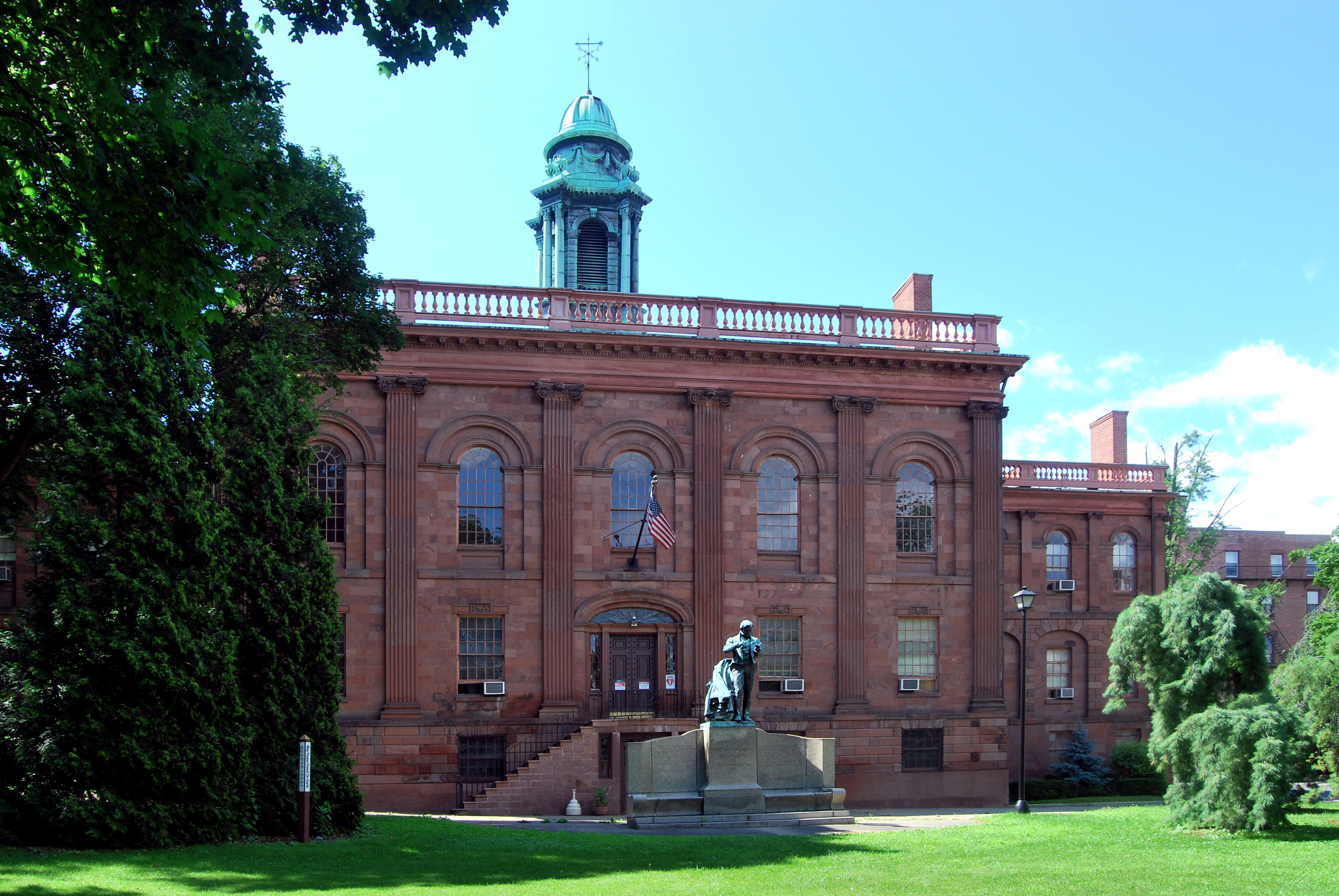
Old Albany Academy Building, the district headquarters

The City School District of Albany (also known as the Albany City School District) is the public school district of Albany, New York. The district is an independent public entity. It is governed by the City School District of Albany Board of Education, whose members are elected in non-partisan elections for staggered, four-year terms. The board selects a superintendent, who is the district's chief administrative official. The district's offices are located in the Old Albany Academy Building at Academy Park. It publishes a seasonal newsletter called Capital Education.

The district has eleven elementary schools, four middle schools, one comprehensive high school, and several other programs of various types, including alternative-education programs in grades 7-12 at the Tony Clement Center for Education, and the Albany International Center, which serves English-language learners in grades 6-12. The 2018-2019 school year saw enrollment at 10,068

== Schools ==
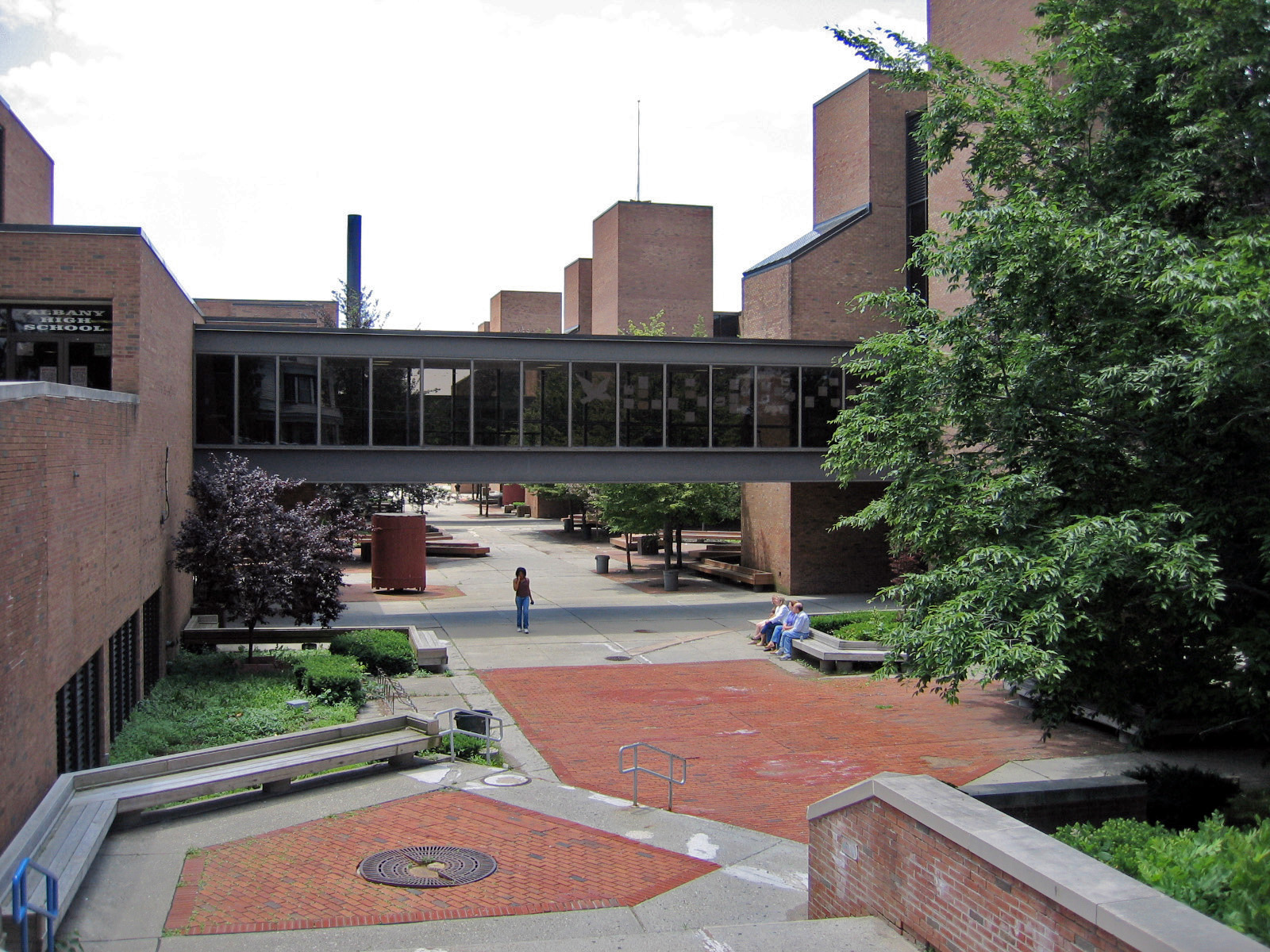
Albany High School on Washington Avenue

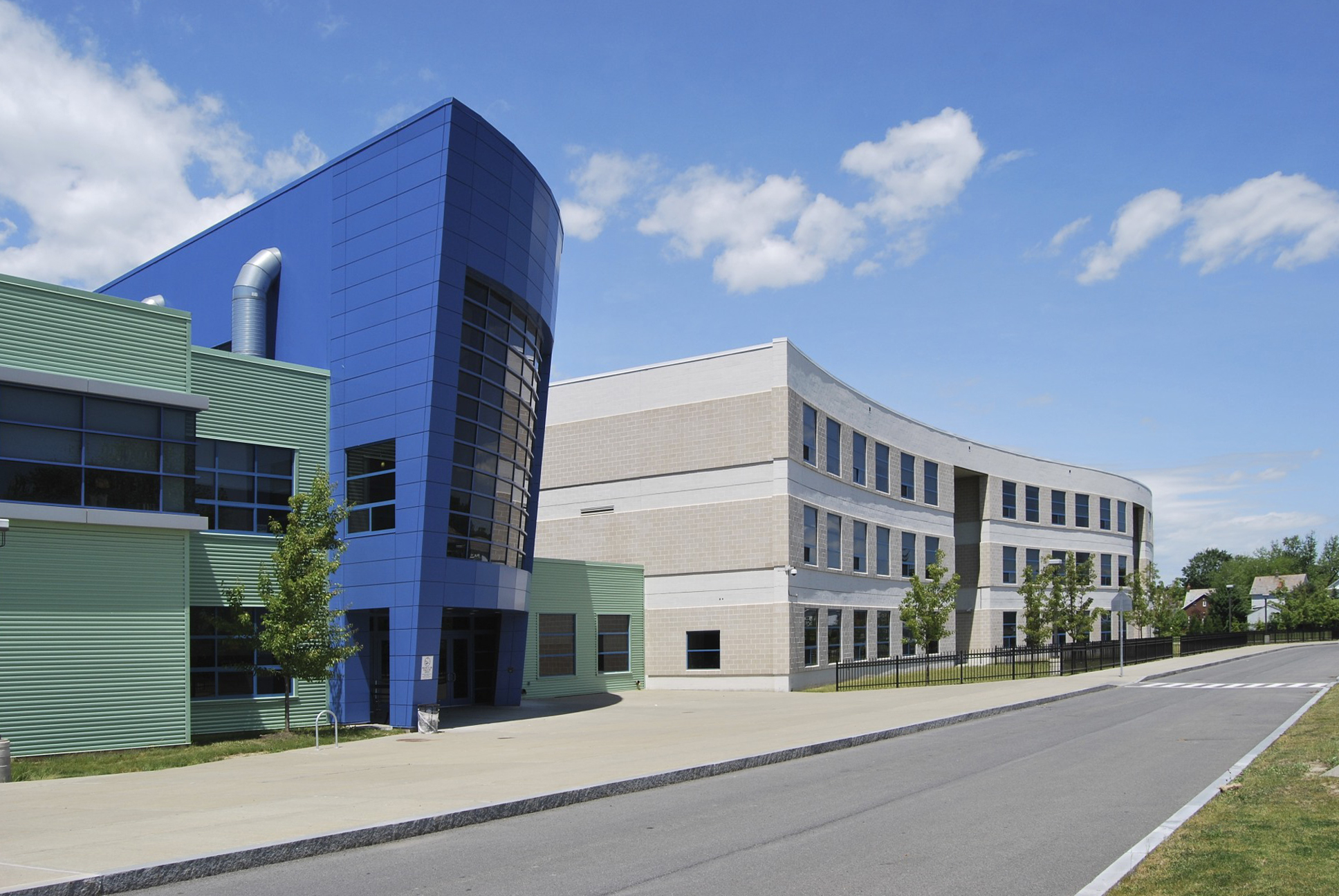
Myers Middle School on Elbel Court

=== High schools ===
- Albany High School- comprehensive high school) (Grade 9-Grade 12), which includes the Abrookin Vocational-Technical Center

=== Middle schools ===
- Stephen and Harriet Myers Middle School (Grade 6-Grade 8)
- Edmund J. O'Neal Middle School of Excellence (Grade 6-Grade 8)
- William S. Hackett Middle School (Grade 6-Grade 8)
- North Albany Middle School (new program starting with Grade 6; building formerly housed PS 20 & N. Albany Academy)

=== Elementary schools ===
- Albany School of Humanities (ASH) (formerly Public School 23)
- Arbor Hill Elementary Community School
- Delaware Community School (formerly Public School 18)
- Eagle Point Elementary School (formerly Public School 27)
- Giffen Memorial Elementary School
- Montessori Magnet School
- New Scotland Elementary (formerly Public School 19)
- Roots Academy at West Hill (formerly Public School 21 and Philip J. Schuyler Achievement Academy)
- Pine Hills Elementary School (formerly Public School 16)
- Sheridan Preparatory Academy
- Thomas O'Brien Academy of Science and Technology (TOAST) (formerly Public School 24)

=== Other ===
- Albany International Center (Grade 6-Grade 12)
- Tony Clement Center for Education (Grade 7-Grade 12)

== Board of education ==
There are seven board members, elected in May in conjunction the annual school budget vote. Board members serve staggered four-year terms, which expire on June 30. Officers are elected by the members. Current board members, as of February 2020:

- Vickie Smith (President)
- Anne Savage (Vice President)
- Sridar Chittur, Ph.D. (Secretary)
- Damarise Mann
- Tabetha Wilson
- Ellen Krejci
- Hassan Elminyawi

== Recent superintendents ==
- 1975–1982: David Bray
- 1982–1989: David Brown
- 1989–1994: John Bach
- 1994–1996: Arthur "Sam" Walton
- 1996–1997: Eleanor Bartlett (interim)
- 1997–2003: Lonnie Palmer
- 2003–2004: Michael Johnson
- 2004–2009: Eva C. Joseph, Ed.D.
- 2009–2012: Raymond Colucciello, Ed.D.
- 2012–2016: Marguerite Vanden Wyngaard, Ph.D.
- 2016-2017: Kimberly Young Wilkins, Ed.D. (interim)
- 2017–2023: Kaweeda G. Adams
- 2023: John Yagielski (interim)
- 2023–present: Joseph Hochreiter
