= First Congregational Church of Albany =

Historic church in New York, United States

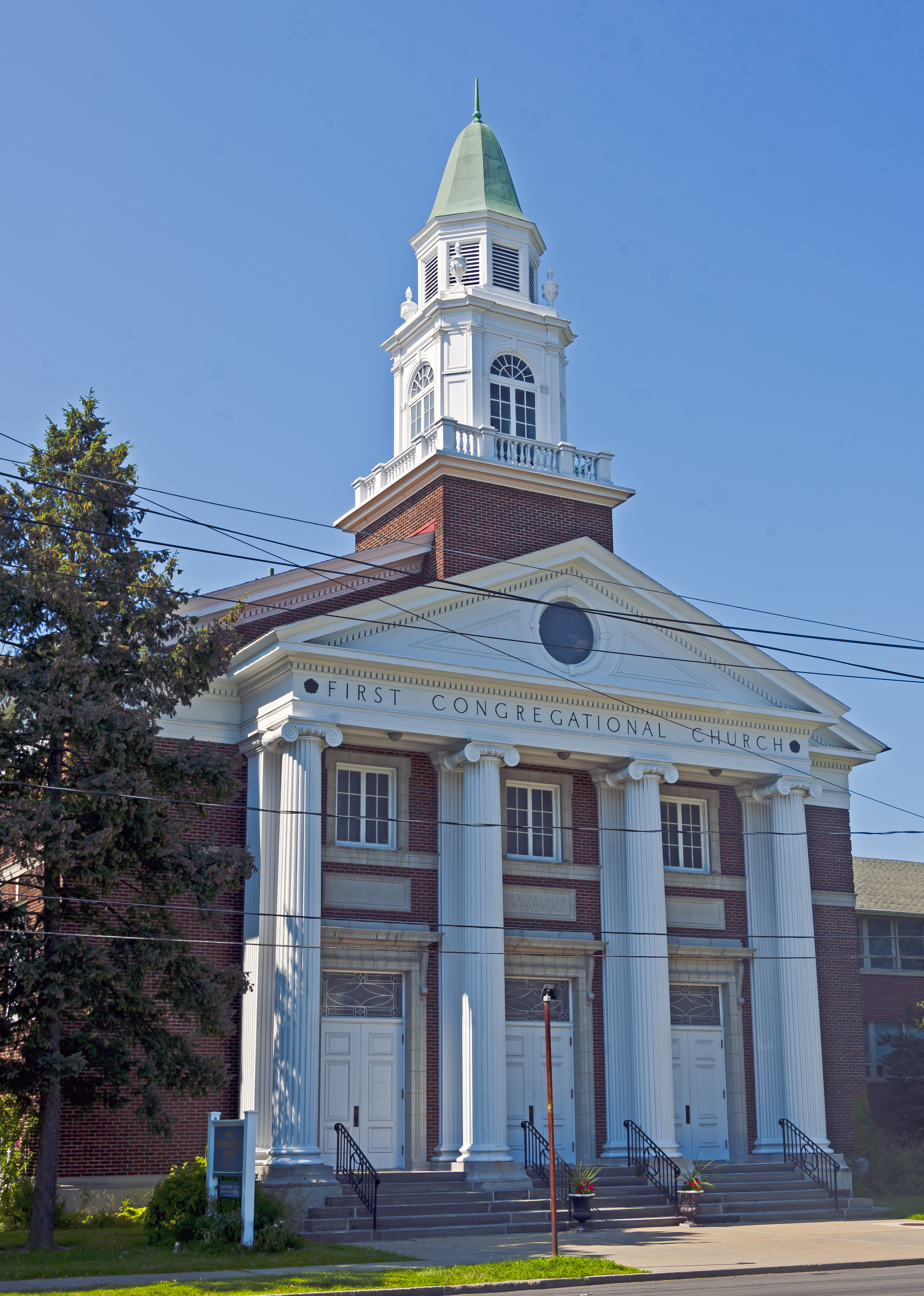
- East (front) elevation, 2015

- Location within New York

Religion
- Affiliation: United Church of Christ, National Association of Congregational Christian Churches
- Leadership: The Rev. James Eaton
- Year consecrated: 1919

Location
- Location: Albany, NY, US
- Coordinates: 42.65404°N 73.78602°W

Architecture
- Architects: Fuller & Robinson Company; Charles A. Schade
- Style: Wren–Gibss Colonial Revival, Modern
- Groundbreaking: 1917
- Completed: 1961

Specifications
- Direction of façade: East
- Spire: 1
- Materials: Steel, stone, brick, asphalt

U.S. National Register of Historic Places
- Added to NRHP: February 14, 2014
- NRHP Reference no.: 14000259

Website
- First Congregational Church of Albany

The First Congregational Church of Albany, also known as The Ray Palmer Memorial, is located on Quail Street in the Woodlawn section of Albany, New York, United States. It is a brick building in the Colonial Revival architectural style built in the 1910s and expanded half a century later. In 2014 it was listed on the National Register of Historic Places.

Within two years of its establishment in 1850 the congregation hosted the Albany Convention, a gathering which helped Congregationalism develop a nationwide reach. The Rev. Ray Palmer, later known for his hymns, guided the church through its early years, when it was located in downtown Albany, first in a former Presbyterian church and later in its own building. In the early 20th century, the church followed its congregants in moving out towards the more suburban areas of Albany being developed along the city's trolley lines.

The Fuller & Robinson Company designed the present church, following the Wren–Gibbs tradition. It was the first Colonial Revival church (Note: The church claims on its website that the current building was the first "Greek Revival" [sic] in Albany in that style, but Stanford White's Benjamin Walworth Arnold House preceded it by more than a decade) in the city, attracting much local media attention. Construction was delayed by the onset of World War I; it was formally dedicated to Ray Palmer in 1919.

As one of the first churches to establish itself in those areas, it formed a social center of the new neighborhood. After World War II, plans went ahead to build a Sunday school wing intended for the original church. It was completed, in an architecturally sympathetic modernist style, by the early 1960s. It continues to have an active congregation, affiliated with both the United Church of Christ and National Association of Congregational Christian Churches.

== Building and grounds ==
The church is located at the northwest corner of the intersection of Quail Street and Maple Avenue in the Woodlawn neighborhood 1.5 miles (2.4 km) west of central Albany. Its lot, just under an acre (41,400 square feet (3,850 m^{2})) in size, takes up all but the northwest quadrant of the irregularly shaped block between Maple, Quail and Grove and Woodlawn avenues. The surrounding terrain is mostly level, at the crest of gentle rises to the north and south.

Other than the church building, the surrounding neighborhood is residential, consisting mainly of two-story single-family detached homes, with a few three-story and multiple-unit properties, on small lots. This gives way to some one-story commercial properties on New Scotland Avenue, the area's main road, a block to the south. Two blocks to the east the residential development yields to the large institutional parcels of Albany Medical Center and Sage College of Albany. Between the two along the south side of New Scotland is the Lewis Pilcher-designed New Scotland Avenue Armory, also listed on the National Register.

A paved parking lot fills the southwestern portion of the lot. A concrete walkway across a lawn with a bike rack, mature evergreen at its west side and two mature deciduous trees at the corner of Maple and Quail connects the south side of the building to the city sidewalks. On the north side is a wide driveway from Woodlawn. A lawn with some more mature trees and shrubs fills the northeastern corner of the property; another sidewalk connects to an entrance at the lawn's south end.

=== Exterior ===
The building itself is a two-story, steel framed three-by-five-bay) cross-gabled structure faced in brick laid in running bond on a cast stone foundation set off from the brick by a beveled water table. The roof is shingled in asphalt and pierced by a steeple on the east and a brick chimney on the west. A similarly gabled two-story brick addition extends from the side gable on the north side.

==== Main building ====
Six full-width stone steps, with four decorative iron handrails, lead up to the entrance portico on the east (front) elevation, which itself is almost as wide as the building. From stone plinth blocks on the portico rise four fluted round wooden columns topped by Ionic capitals. Above them is a wide frieze between molded cornices and an entablature with "First Congregational Church" engraved across the width in capital letters. A dentilled cornice tops it, setting off a pediment with a recessed bullseye window in the tympanum and triangular moldings on each side, topped with another dentilled cornice.

Behind the portico, the facade itself features four square pilasters with the same treatment as the columns. Between them, on the first floor, are three entrances. All have the same treatment, with paneled wooden double doors topped by a decorative glass transom, set in a stone surround. Scrolled brackets support a stone cornice over each door with Adam style tracery. Above each entrance is a stone panel; the one in the middle is engraved with the words "Ray Palmer Memorial." A cast stone beltcourse separates the first and second stories, serving as the sill for the six-light casement windows above them, set in more restrained stone surrounds than the doors below them.

At the corners the bricks are laid to simulate quoins. The stone beltcourse continues onto the side profiles. On the first of the five bays west of the portico, the basement is set with six-over-six double-hung sash topped by a splayed brick lintel. The second story has a six-light casement similar to those on the east, topped by an eight-light transom. It is set with a stone sill and splayed brick lintel with a central keystone topped by the beltcourse. At the roofline the frieze continues.

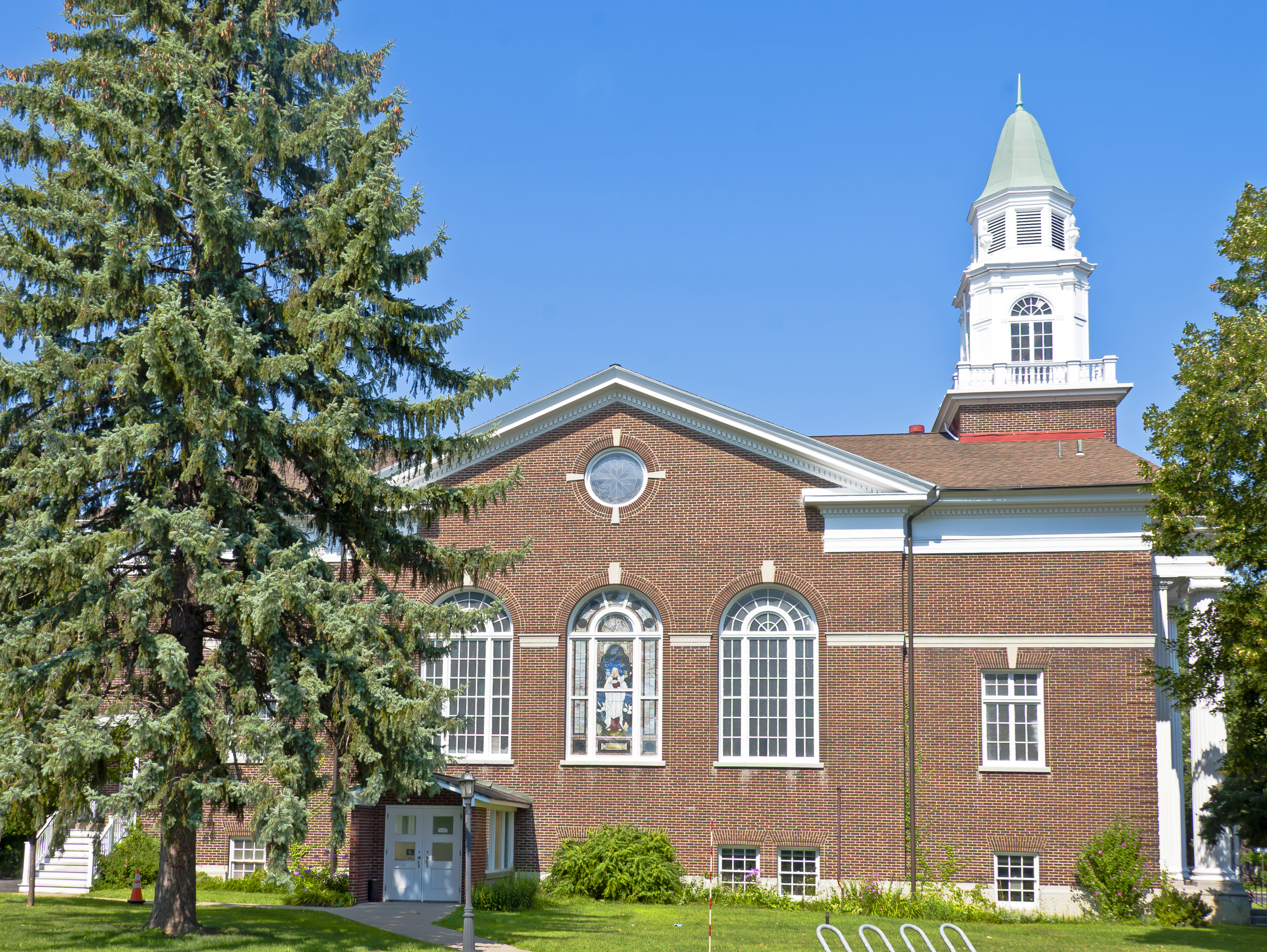
The south facade

On the south facade, the cross-gabled section projects slightly. The eastern two of its three bays are set with double six-over-six double-hung sash. From the western bay a small brick vestibule with gently pitched gable roof sheltering two glass and wooden doors projects. It has three full-pane glass windows on either side.

The beltcourse serves as the springline for the three round-arched windows on the second story of the cross-gable. The center window is set with stained glass while the two flanking windows have 24-light central sections, 12-pane sidelights and radiating muntins in the arch. All three are set in splayed brick surrounds topped by keystones. The pediment above is broken with a bullseye window set amid splayed brick and keystones at all four cardinal points. West of the cross-gable is another bay with the same treatment as the one to the east of it.

An entrance to the basement, flanked by two more six-over-six double-hung sash, is in the center of on the west (rear) of the building. It is set in the center of a section that, like the entrance portico on the other end, runs nearly the full width of the face and projects slightly. Just east of the south corner, a wooden staircase with wooden handrail ascends to a small roofed porch on the first story.

The stone beltcourse does not continue on to the west projection. Each story has two narrow six-over-six double-hung sash in the side bays, with a blind central bay. At the northwest corner, a nine-light wooden door provides access to the basement on the north facade. A window on the above story is more modern in style, similar to those on the adjacent wing.

==== North wing ====
Like the church's main block, the Sunday School wing on the north side has two stories with an exposed basement, but is not as tall. On the main block's facade above it, the bullseye window has been bricked in although its surround remains. It is faced in similar brick and topped with a gently pitched gabled roof covered in asphalt shingles. At its southeast corner, where it meets the main block, a full-height glass facade marks the main entrance.

On the rest of the wing's east facade, bands of windows run across the basement and both stories. All have a small section in the bottom that opens vertically. The north facade has two of these windows at either side, flanking a slightly projecting blind middle section in which a brickwork cross has been created

The northern bay of the wing's west facade has an entrance at the basement level; it is blind above. To its south the banded windows, similar to those on the opposite side, resume. On this side they end where a one-story flat-roofed hyphen sits between the wing and the main building. A set of stone steps with a metal handrail lead from the driveway to an entrance, sheltered by a broad eave.

==== Steeple ====
Atop the pediment the first of the steeple's four stages, a square brick platform, begins. It is topped with a molded cornice and turned balustrade, behind which is an octagonal stage. On the wider surfaces are double ten-light casement windows topped by a round-arched transom with radiating muntins. All are between small smooth square pilasters topped by molding. The narrower surfaces have two vertical panels, the bottom one longer than the top.

A paneled frieze between two molded cornices sets off that stage from the one above, where classical urns mark the chamfered corners. From it rises a louvered octagonal belfry with all facets of equal width, topped by a copper bell-shaped cupola. A plain finial is at the very top of the structure.

=== Interior ===
All three entry doors open into the same narthex, with stairs leading to a full-width platform where doors opposite them open into the sanctuary. On the north and south sides are doors with stairs leading to the choir loft above. All doors in the narthex are paneled double doors with transoms in simple classical surrounds topped with entablatures.

Two aisles divide the wooden pews, on a carpeted floor. To their west, at the nave, is a large wooden table on a platform, with a Gothic Revival baptismal font next to it. A knee wall separates it from an upper platform in the chancel where the pulpit is located. On either side of the chancel are large racks with organ pipes; however, those on the south side are purely decorative and non-functional.

On the walls fluted composite pilasters with cushioned egg-and-dart capitals rise to a modillioned entablature with triglyphs at the ceiling line. The ceiling itself is mostly flat. On the north wall, artificial lighting behind the windows in the shallow transepts, now blocked by the Sunday School wing, balances the natural light on the other side. The chancel features the same wall treatment as the rest of the sanctuary, with an elliptical arched molding above. It is topped by the bullseye window, set with stained glass depicting Christ in Gethsemane. The pilasters and entablature continue in the choir loft as well.

Below the sanctuary is the church basement. It is divided into a large meeting room, cafeteria and social room. The latter has a small stage with proscenium, and metal beams support the ceiling.

The north wing has on both floors a T-shaped plan. The double-loaded corridors at the south end reveal the original church's exterior wall and features. To the north it opens into classrooms, meeting rooms and a small chapel. The halls and rooms have modern finishings such as vinyl tile, concrete block walls and dropped ceilings.

== History ==
The church has used three buildings in its history.

=== 1600s–1850: Congregationalism and its journey to Albany ===
Congregationalism arose in the 16th century, during the English Reformation, when local churches sought greater control over their affairs than the Roman Catholic Church, and after it the Protestant Church of England, would allow. Many of its adherents were among the Puritans who left England during the next century for its North American colonies. For a century afterwards, even after the establishment of the United States, American Congregationalists were primarily concentrated in New England. In the late 18th and early 19th centuries, as settlers from that region began to move west in search of land to farm, the denomination began establishing itself in those regions, particularly upstate New York.

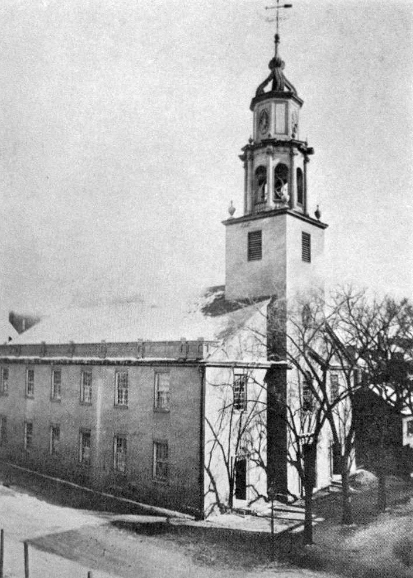
The 1795 church used by First Congregational during its first years

At first, many of those Congregationalists worshipped with other Protestant denominations, as they were too few to support churches of their own. In Albany, it took until 1849 before 13 Congregationalists, among them congressman and banker Rufus H. King, were able to take the first step in that direction, when they bought a former Presbyterian church at the corner of Beaver and South Pearl streets near the end of the year. That building, no longer extant, was in the Wren–Gibbs tradition, built in 1795 with a steeple by Philip Hooker added in 1808.

During the ensuing year further steps would be taken to establish a Congregationalist church. After renovations to the building were finished in April, the first services were held there; The Rev. Leonard Bacon traveled up to Albany from his church in New Haven, Connecticut, to preside. Over the summer the church was formally incorporated, with 81 members joining. By December 1850, The Rev. Ray Palmer was called from Bath, Maine, to become the church's first pastor.

=== 1850–1866: First church and the Albany Convention ===
Within the next two years, the church had sufficiently established itself to host the first gathering of American Congregationalists since the colonial era a century earlier. In October 1852 463 ministers, representing 17 states and parts of Canada, including Lyman Beecher and his son Henry, met at the church to discuss the future of Congregationalism. Participants debated issues such as the church's stance on slavery, but most importantly its relationship with Presbyterianism, represented by the Beechers and others.

As settlers had moved from the original Thirteen Colonies into what is now the Midwest, Congregationalists coming from New England had found themselves living next to Presbyterians originating primarily in the Middle Atlantic states such as New York and Pennsylvania. To form churches, the two groups had often combined their numbers, and at the beginning the century both denominations had agreed on a Plan of Union to facilitate this. However, doctrinal differences between the two, particularly in light of a widening schism among the Presbyterians themselves, had resulted in charges of heresy and revocations of support for some newer synods in Western New York and Ohio.

The implementation of the Plan of Union had thus led to increasing dissatisfaction with it among members of both denominations, and at the Albany Convention of 1852 it was formally abandoned. The event has been seen by historians as marking the beginning of American Congregationalism's existence as a separate and distinct denomination—shortly afterward, the American Congregational Union (ACU), now the Congregational Church Building Society, was established in another meeting at the church. The convention was also one of the first events in Albany to draw attention to the city outside the state, and even outside the country, due to some of the prominent churchmen of the era in attendance. So much did the convention impact the city that Albany's Common Council passed an ordinance requiring that the streets around the church, then paved with cobblestone, be covered with tanbark to suppress the noise created by all the wheeled carts rumbling over them.

=== 1866–1917: Second church ===
In 1866 Palmer left to serve as secretary of the ACU, having helped the church grow to 407 members. Shortly afterwards, the church began construction on its own building. The Romanesque Revival structure of polychrome brick a few blocks away, at the corner of Beaver and Eagle streets, cost $130,000 to erect. It was finished and dedicated in 1869; it too has since been demolished.

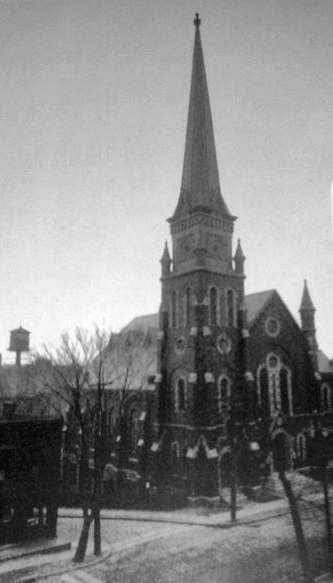
The 1866 church

The new building could accommodate up to a thousand people at a service. Almost that many people would be members of the First Congregational Church between its founding and 1886, the year it recorded having 396 members. It hosted morning and evening services on Sundays, Sunday school, and supported the Bethany Mission School on South Pearl Street nearby.

While the church, like Albany generally, benefited from the Gilded Age prosperity and the city's location at the eastern end of the Erie Canal, the strong industrial economy was also changing the city in ways that would challenge the church. By 1900, when First Congregational celebrated its 50th anniversary with speeches by prominent residents and a special service honoring the memory of Palmer, who had died in 1886, some of the longtime residents of Albany's downtown area, including some of the church's members, had moved out to newly developed suburban residential areas along the trolley lines that radiated outward. In turn the neighborhoods near the church like the Mansion District were becoming home to immigrants from predominantly Catholic countries who worshipped at churches of their own faith. Around the church itself, the neighborhood was becoming increasingly commercial, a place people visited and worked rather than lived.

The Rev. Charles Hager, pastor at that time, observed that there increasingly seemed to be a surplus of Protestant churches in the area relative to their churchgoers. The decline in active congregants was also making it harder for the church to keep up the 1866 building. In 1912, the church agreed to sell part of the lot to a developer planning an office block. During negotiations, the developer expressed interest in buying the entire property if the church was interested in selling.

After a special meeting, the church approved it as long as it could take certain interior fixtures along to any new location. Ultimately the deal failed to go through, but the question of the church's uncertain future in downtown Albany remained. In 1915 the church's trustees reaffirmed the church's desire to relocate with funds obtained from the sale of the church.

Near the end of the following year, the sale was finally made, when the city was looking for a place for a new municipal building. The property changed hands for only $35,000, almost $100,000 less than it had cost to building the church a half-century earlier, reflecting the decline in downtown land values in the early 20th century. With the transaction complete, the church turned its attention to potential new property.

The best location seemed to be the area around Quail and Maple streets. The land was inexpensive, a bus line had recently been started down nearby New Scotland Avenue, and several prominent members of the congregation had already moved to the rapidly growing Woodlawn neighborhood themselves. Still, the church was not sure if the move would succeed. While there were no other churches in the area there was no guarantee that Woodlawn residents would become members of First Congregational. Older members, too, might find themselves unable to travel to the new location and could possibly leave the church if that were the case.

=== 1917–1919: Construction of third church ===
In early 1917 the church bought the property for the current building and commissioned a design from the firm of Fuller & Robinson, cofounded by Albert W. Fuller, a prominent Albany architect whose extant buildings in the city include the Harmanus Bleecker Library, University Club of Albany and the YMCA building downtown, all listed on the National Register as well. It is unclear how Fuller's firm was chosen, although it may have been through personal connections. Some relatives of his wife's may have been members of the congregation, and after accepting his 5% commission he donated a third of that to the congregation as a "personal gift".

The Wren–Gibbs church design

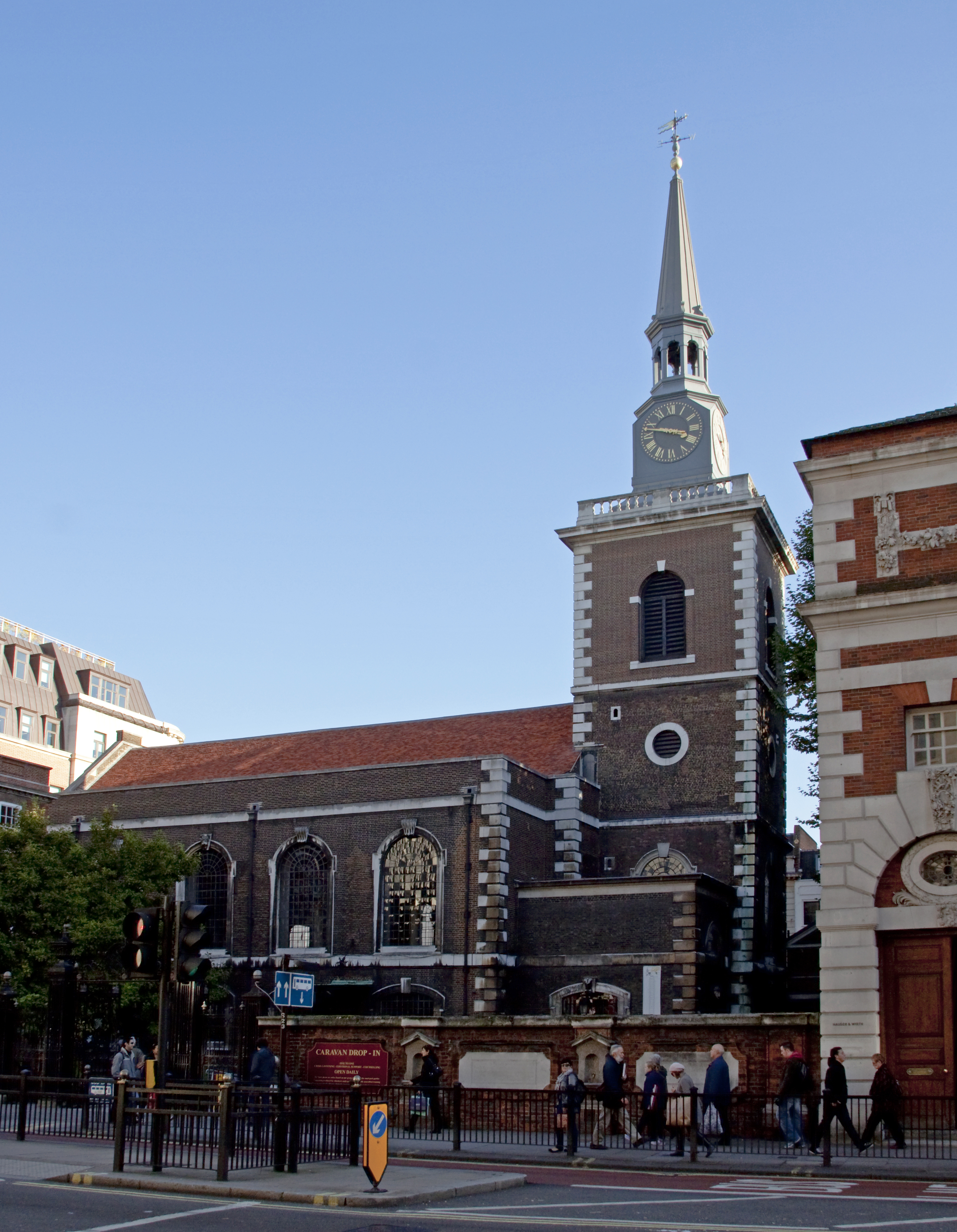
Wren's St James's Church, Piccadilly

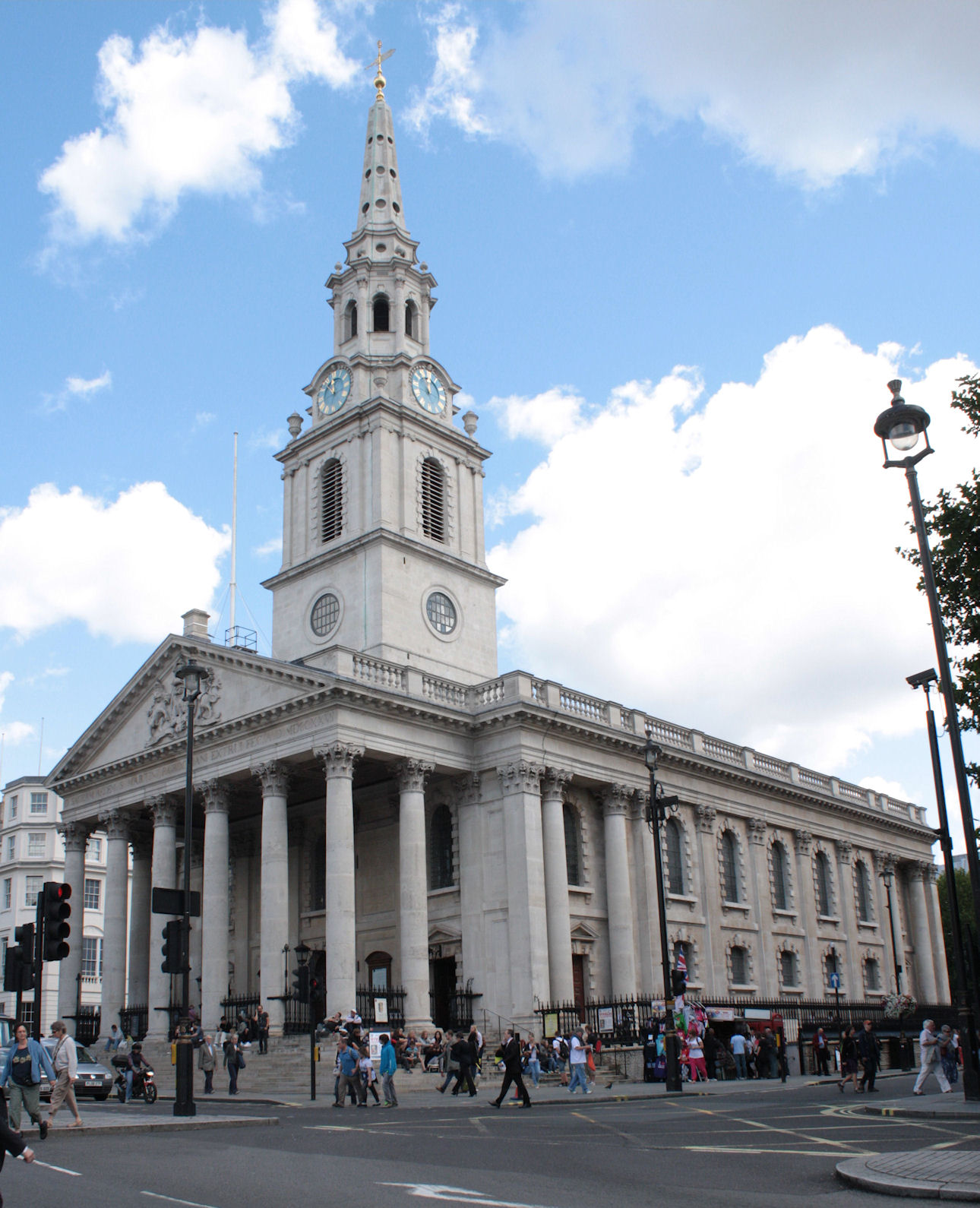
Gibbs's St Martin-in-the-Fields

Fuller's design was a radical break from previous Albany ecclesiastical architecture. It was the first building in the city to use the relatively new Colonial Revival style. "There will be no other church building in Albany of this particular type," wrote one local newspaper at the time. Already widely in use for local government buildings of the era, it was also strongly associated with Congregational church buildings in New England where the denomination had first flourished in North America. Its use for a church in Albany reflected the Congregationalist belief that the church was just as important in daily life as the state.

His design had many aspects of the Wren–Gibbs church type, based on churches those two architects had designed to be more accommodating to Protestant worship in the wake of the Great Fire of London. They featured classical forms and decoration to welcome worshippers with a sense of continuity and order, but retaining the tall steeple, Gothic at first but later done with a classical treatment as well, as a way of indicating the church's presence from a distance. Inside, they had vaulted ceilings so the congregants could better hear the minister (which led Wren to call it the "auditory" church) and large natural windows to allow light in since they would be expected to be reading along with the minister in their Bibles or prayer books. American iterations of the form were strongly influenced by Wren's St James's Church, Piccadilly, and Gibbs's St Martin-in-the-Fields, pictures of which circulated widely in North American pattern books during the 18th and early 19th centuries. Many of these elements are found in the First Congregational Church building.

Later in the 19th century, the Wren-Gibbs model was supplanted by the Greek Revival style and the various late Victorian styles. Then, after the Free Classical mode of the Queen Anne Style in the 1890s led to the emergence of the Colonial Revival mode, it re-emerged. There were, however, some adaptations resulting from technological improvements of the time that can be seen in the First Congregational building.

The first was common to most Wren–Gibbs churches of the era. Electric lighting meant that stained glass windows could be installed on the sides without sacrificing the congregation's ability to read along with the minister. More specifically, the steel framing used for the structural system probably forced the church to forego the vaulted ceiling in favor of a flat one. On a purely aesthetic level, the church's transepts, so shallow as to be more like cross-gables, are its greatest digression from the standard Wren-Gibbs plan.

Shortly after concluding its contract with Fuller's firm, in April 1917, the U.S. entered World War I, leading to a shortage of building materials and an increase in costs. As a result the church was forced to scale its plans back to just a church, foregoing the Sunday school wing and parish house that it had originally planned. The last service in the 1866 church was held in June.

Construction of the new church proceeded on a decelerated timetable while the congregation worshipped in a temporary location. In November the cornerstone was laid in a ceremony that drew considerable attention from local newspapers. Almost a year later, shortly after the war ended, enough of the building was complete for services to be held in the basement.

=== 1919–present: Sunday School wing ===
Formal dedication services were held over the last week of April 1919, at which the church was also designated the Ray Palmer Memorial. His granddaughter donated the communion table and chairs, one of many interior furnishings given to First Congregational by supporters, most of which remain in use. The church's baptismal font and bell had been salvaged from the 1866 church, deliberately chosen to symbolize the church's rebirth in the new structure and its continuing call to worship.

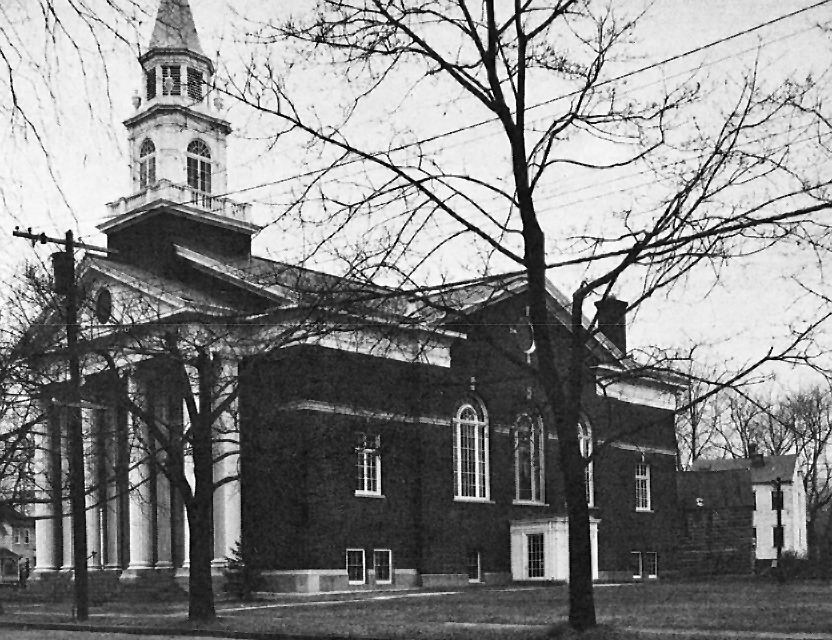
North facade of church building in 1958, prior to construction of Sunday School wing

At the beginning of that year, the church had 255 members; roughly 50 more had joined by the end, enough to consider its move to Woodlawn successful. It became the social center of a growing neighborhood, sponsoring civic activities and youth groups such as the Boy Scouts and Girl Scouts. With a bowling alley in the basement, it sponsored a members' bowling team that competed against other Protestant churches in Albany.

First Congregational continued to enjoy healthy membership throughout the 1930s and 1940s despite the Depression and World War II. In 1956, it merged with Second Congregational Christian Church, swelling its membership even more. This growth, combined with the church's resulting strong finances, led the trustees of the time to finally undertake finishing Fuller's original design with a Sunday school wing.

The church commissioned Charles Argow Schade, an architect as prominent in Albany as Fuller had been a half-century before, to design a wing more in keeping with the times. Fuller's design had continued the neoclassicism of the main block, with a broad hipped roof and columns and pilasters like those on the east facade. Schade, who had designed several other Albany churches of that area, instead delivered a modernist take, keeping the general form and red brick facing but replacing the hipped roof with a gently pitched gable and the classical decoration with more functional modernist touches such as the window bands and full-height glass facade at the wing's main entrance.

At a ceremony commemorating the church's 100th anniversary in April 1960, ground was broken for the new wing. It was complete the next year. Schade's work was not limited to the wing. In addition to renovating the main building's basement, he also added new heating and lighting.

A decline in membership in the early 2000s led to a crisis in the church several years later. In the middle of 2011, pastor The Rev. Tony Green resigned after John Dennehey, the church's chief deacon, was arrested on charges that he had shown pornography and exposed himself to two boys studying with him in preparation for their confirmation. Green told the Albany Times-Union he had been aware of the charges and had asked the man to resign his position, but he had refused to do so. After Dennehey's parents, who were described as the most powerful members of the congregation following its recent decline, prevented Green from dismissing him, the pastor felt he had no option but to leave his post in protest. Dennehey pleaded guilty to a two-count misdemeanor indictment of endangering the welfare of a child; he was sentenced to two months in jail and three years' probation. The Rev. James Eaton was called to replace him and currently serves in the position.

== Beliefs and governance ==
First Congregational describes its belief as meaning that "there is no hierarchy and each worshipper has the freedom to develop their own belief as led by God." It describes its mission as "returning the favor of God's love by setting aside differences through worship, inclusiveness, fellowship and service" and its vision as "building a vibrant and vital church in an urban environment to praise God." In order to build this church, it and its members practice "worship, fellowship, education, service, and outreach in an inclusive and diverse community."

All members are encouraged to take part in church governance. First Congregational holds an annual meeting on the third Sunday of every May at which members are elected to the boards of deacons and trustees, as well as other bodies within the church. One of those is the church council, which meets every two months to receive reports from the other boards and coordinate the church's activities.

== Programs and services ==
The church holds services every Sunday morning, followed by a coffee fellowship, except for July and August, when it has traditionally taken a "summer vacation." During those months the church instead holds informal services in the Sunday School wing. Communion is celebrated on the first Sunday of the month save the two the church takes as vacation. All are welcome to attend regardless of background; the church declares itself to be gay-friendly in particular.

In the community, the church is active in soliciting volunteers for a regional food bank and homeless shelter. It is a partner in Cornerstone, the Protestant campus ministry at SUNY Albany. A partnership with First Israel African Methodist Episcopal Church that began during First Congregational's early 2010s search for a new pastor as a temporary measure has continued after the position was filled.

== See also ==
- Architecture of Albany, New York
- History of Albany, New York
- List of Congregational churches
- National Register of Historic Places listings in Albany, New York
- St. Andrew's Episcopal Church (Albany, New York), another Register-listed church that moved from downtown Albany to a suburban neighborhood in the early 20th century.
