= Ray Palmer (pastor) =

American pastor and hymnwriter (1808–1887)

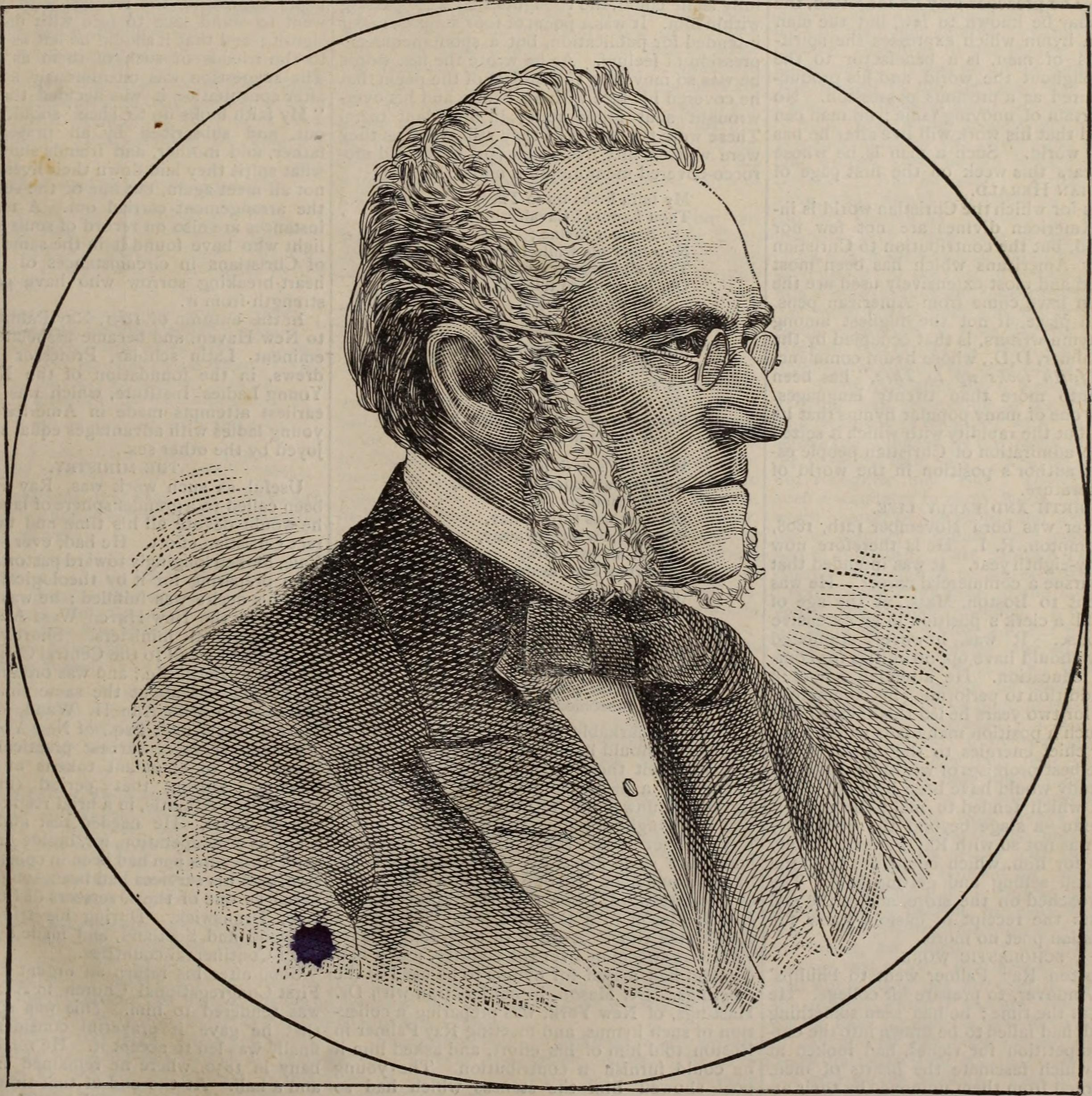
Ray Palmer

Ray Palmer (November 12, 1808 – March 29, 1887) was an American pastor and author of a number of hymns, the best known of which was "My faith looks up to Thee".

Palmer was the fourth child and third son of the Hon. Thomas and Susanna (Palmer) Palmer, of Little Compton, Rhode Island, where he was born. It was intended that he should pursue a commercial career, and therefore he was sent at the age of 13 to Boston to begin a clerkship in a large business house, while at the same time completing his education. By the age of 15, he had decided that he wished to prepare for college, and he was then sent, accordingly, to Phillips Academy, Andover. He graduated from Yale College in 1830.

On leaving college he taught for a year in a private school for young ladies in New York City, and then returned to New Haven, where—at first in connection with Dr. E. A. Andrews, and later as sole proprietor—he conducted the Young Ladies' Institute, in Wooster Place. In the meantime he was married, October 3, 1832, to Ann Maria, daughter of the late Marmaduke Waud, a merchant of Albany, of English birth. He also pursued theological studies while in New Haven, and on disposing of his school, in the fall of 1834, removed to Boston, and began to preach.

In 1835 he accepted a call to a new church (now called the Central Church) in Bath, Maine, over which he was ordained on the 22nd of July. Fifteen years of earnest, practical labor followed, after which rest and change of scene were needed, and on December 10, 1850, he was installed as the first pastor of the newly formed First Congregational Church of Albany, New York. Here he continued for fifteen most fruitful years of labor, until April 18, 1866, when he was dismissed to accept the secretaryship of the American Congregational Union, in New York City. Here he served the churches for twelve years, or until May 1, 1878, during which time more than 600 churches were elected by the aid of this society.

As the salary was insufficient, he was stimulated to a good deal of literary labor during this period. In May, 1870, he removed his residence to Newark, New Jersey, where he spent the rest of his life. On retiring from the service of the Congregational Union, he devoted himself to literary work almost exclusively. In November 1881, he became acting pastor (Dr. Hepworth having the care of the pulpit) of the Belleville Avenue Congregational Church in Newark, and this arrangement continued for three years.

On February 12, 1883, he had a hemorrhagic stroke, and was partially paralyzed. He rallied, however, and showed afterwards considerable vigor of mind and body. His infirmities increased with years, and on February 6, 1886, he suffered from a second attack, from which he rallied surprisingly; but on February 20, 1887, a third attack came, and on March 22 a rapid degeneration of the brain began. He died March 29, 1887, at the age of 78. His wife died March 8, 1886; of their ten children, one son, also a graduate of Yale, and two daughters survived him.

He received the degree of Doctor of Divinity from Union College in 1852. From 1865 to 1878 he was a member of the Board of Visitors of Andover Seminary. He wrote extensively for the quarterlies, and for the literary and religious press generally. He published six or seven volumes in prose, besides numerous discourses, and three or four volumes of hymns and other poems.
