= National Council of the Congregational Churches of the United States =

Mainline Protestant denomination

National Council of Congregational Churches of the United States
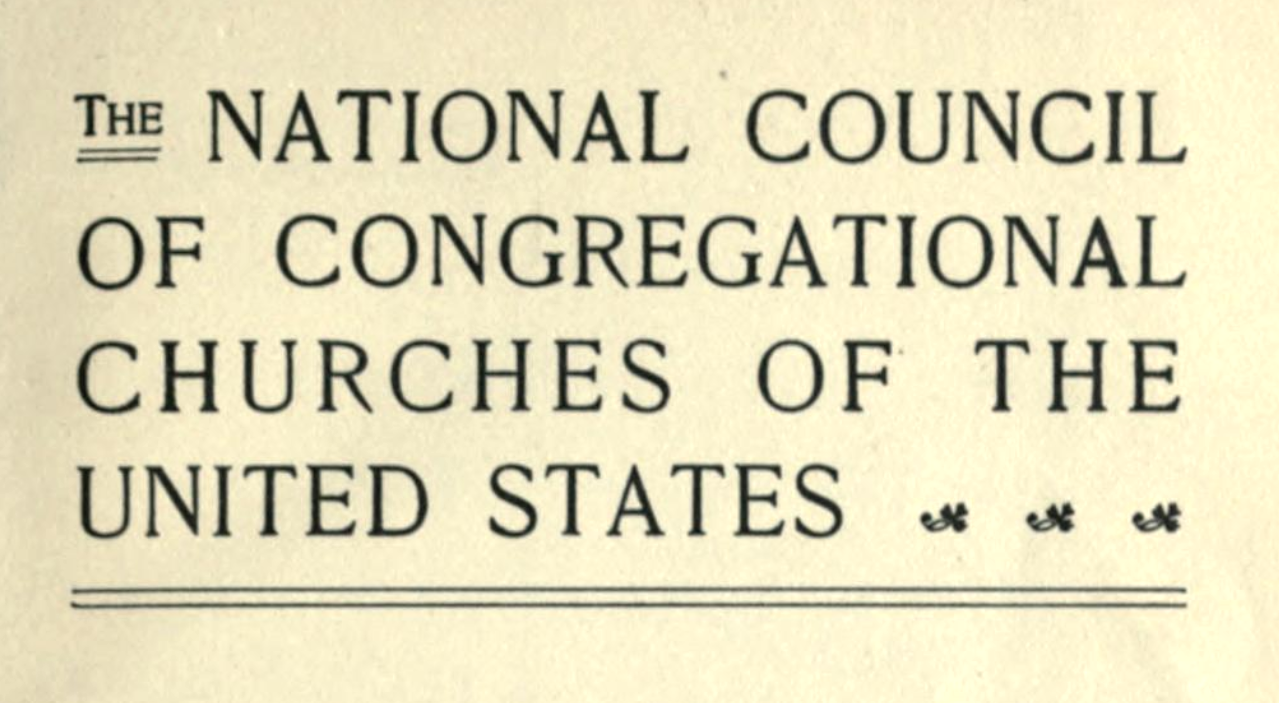
- Orientation: Mainline Protestant
- Theology: Reformed Congregationalist
- Polity: Congregational
- Associations: Federal Council of Churches (1908)
- Origin: 1865; Boston, Massachusetts
- Absorbed: Evangelical Protestant Church of North America (1927)
- Merged into: Congregational Christian Churches (1931)
- Defunct: 1931
- Congregations: 5,497 in 1928
- Members: 939,130 in 1928

The National Council of Congregational Churches of the United States was a mainline Protestant, Christian denomination in the United States. Its organization as a denomination was delayed by the Civil War. Congregational leaders met again in Boston, Massachusetts in 1865, where they began to hammer out standards of church procedures (polity) and adopted a statement of faith, known as the Burial Hill Declaration. Denominational organization came in 1871 with formation of the National Council of Congregational Churches, which existed until its merger in 1931. In 1928, there were 5,497 Congregational churches in the U.S. with a membership of 939,130. These churches were served by 5,648 ministers.

The Congregational churches originated from the Puritans of colonial New England. Congregationalists were traditionally Calvinists strongly committed to congregational polity, from which the denomination took its name.

In 1931, the Congregationalists merged with the Christian Connection to form the Congregational Christian Churches. The National Council is a predecessor body to several American denominations, including the United Church of Christ, the National Association of Congregational Christian Churches, and the Conservative Congregational Christian Conference.

== History ==
American Congregationalism grew out of the Puritan migration to New England in the 17th century. The Congregational church was the established church of Connecticut until 1818 and Massachusetts until 1833. The Puritans and their Congregationalist descendants had much in common with Presbyterians. Both denominations shared a Reformed theology; however, Congregationalists practiced a more decentralized form of church governance described in the Cambridge Platform. In this, Congregationalists were similar to American Baptists, but where Baptists practiced believers baptism by immersion, Congregationalists practiced infant baptism.

Largely through the influence of Jonathan Edwards, Congregationalists came to adopt a moderate form of Calvinism known as New England theology and in a more radical form as New Haven theology.

By the 19th century, Congregationalists were forming voluntary organizations for mutual cooperation and support among churches called associations. In some places, state-wide general associations were organized. In 1801, the Congregationalist churches of New England entered into a formal agreement with the Presbyterian Church in the United States of America called the Plan of Union. It remained in effect until 1852. By that time, Congregationalists had developed a greater denominational consciousness, which ultimately led to the 1865 Boston meeting where they began the process of establishing standards of church procedures (polity) and adopted a statement of faith, known as the Burial Hill Declaration. That was followed by the denominational organizational meeting in 1871.

In 1927, motivated by the ecumenical movement, Congregationalists united with the Evangelical Protestant Church of North America. This was a pietistic denomination of Swiss and German origin with about six thousand members, most of whom were located in the vicinities of Pittsburgh, Pennsylvania and Cincinnati, Ohio. The Evangelical Protestants were easily absorbed into the National Council. They shared with the Congregationalists an affinity for liberal theology, social activism and congregational polity.

== Beliefs ==
In 1913, the National Council adopted the Kansas City Statement of Faith. This confessional statement affirmed belief in the Trinity and the Bible's role in revealing God's will. It also affirmed the "freedom and responsibility of the individual soul, and the right of private judgment." The church's mission was described as "to proclaim the gospel to all mankind, exalting the worship of the one true God, and laboring for the progress of knowledge, the promotion of justice, the reign of peace, and the realization of human brotherhood."

The Social Gospel flourished among Congregational churches, and the National Council pledged itself to work for a society that guaranteed a decent wage and denied privileges for the wealthy. In 1925, the National Council adopted a Statement of Social Ideals, which outlined a progressive "Christian social order". The five ideals include universal education, support for labor unions, the preservation and support of rural communities as well as price controls on agricultural products, the elimination of all forms of racial discrimination, and the abolition of all national armed forces except for internal police.

== Organization ==
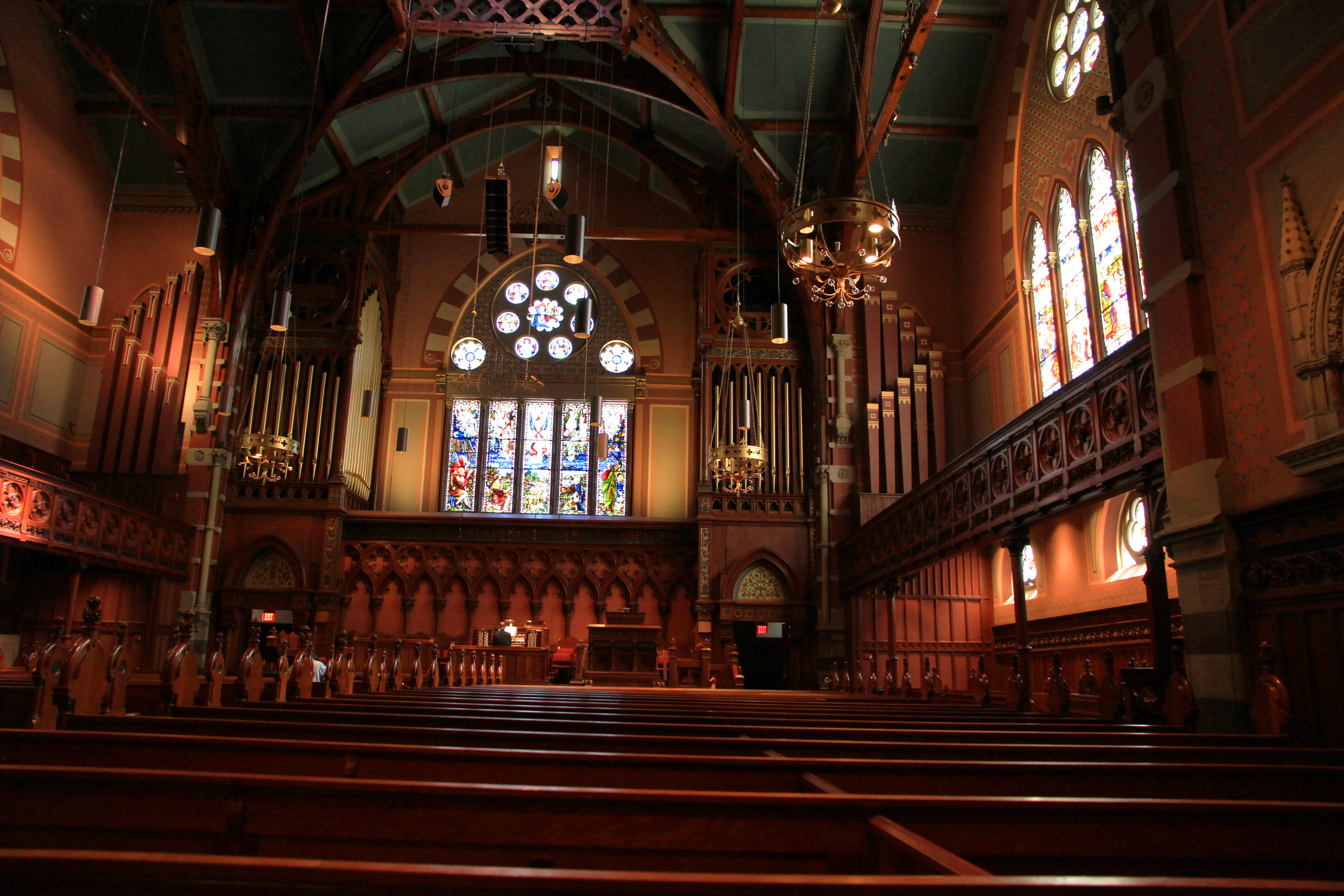
Interior of Old South Church in Boston, built in 1873

The Congregational churches adhered to congregational polity where local congregations remained legally autonomous and independent. Congregations managed their own internal affairs through church meetings where all church members were entitled to vote. The church meeting elected the congregation's minister and deacons.

At the same time, congregations voluntarily cooperated together in district associations and state conferences. Meetings of the National Council occurred every two years. Each district association elected one delegate to the Council, and each state conference elected two delegates, one of which had to be a woman. District associations with more than 10 churches were entitled to send one delegate for each additional 10 churches. State conferences with membership greater than 10 thousand were entitled to send two delegates for each additional 10 thousand members, and half of these additional delegates had to be women.

The purpose of the National Council was to provide a forum to coordinate common programs and organizations of Congregational churches, such as managing a pension fund for Congregationalist ministers. A moderator presided over sessions of the Council. An Executive Committee elected by the Council was responsible for overseeing the work of the various agencies of the Council in between biennial sessions. Day-to-day affairs were managed by a full-time Secretary of the National Council.

== Mission societies ==
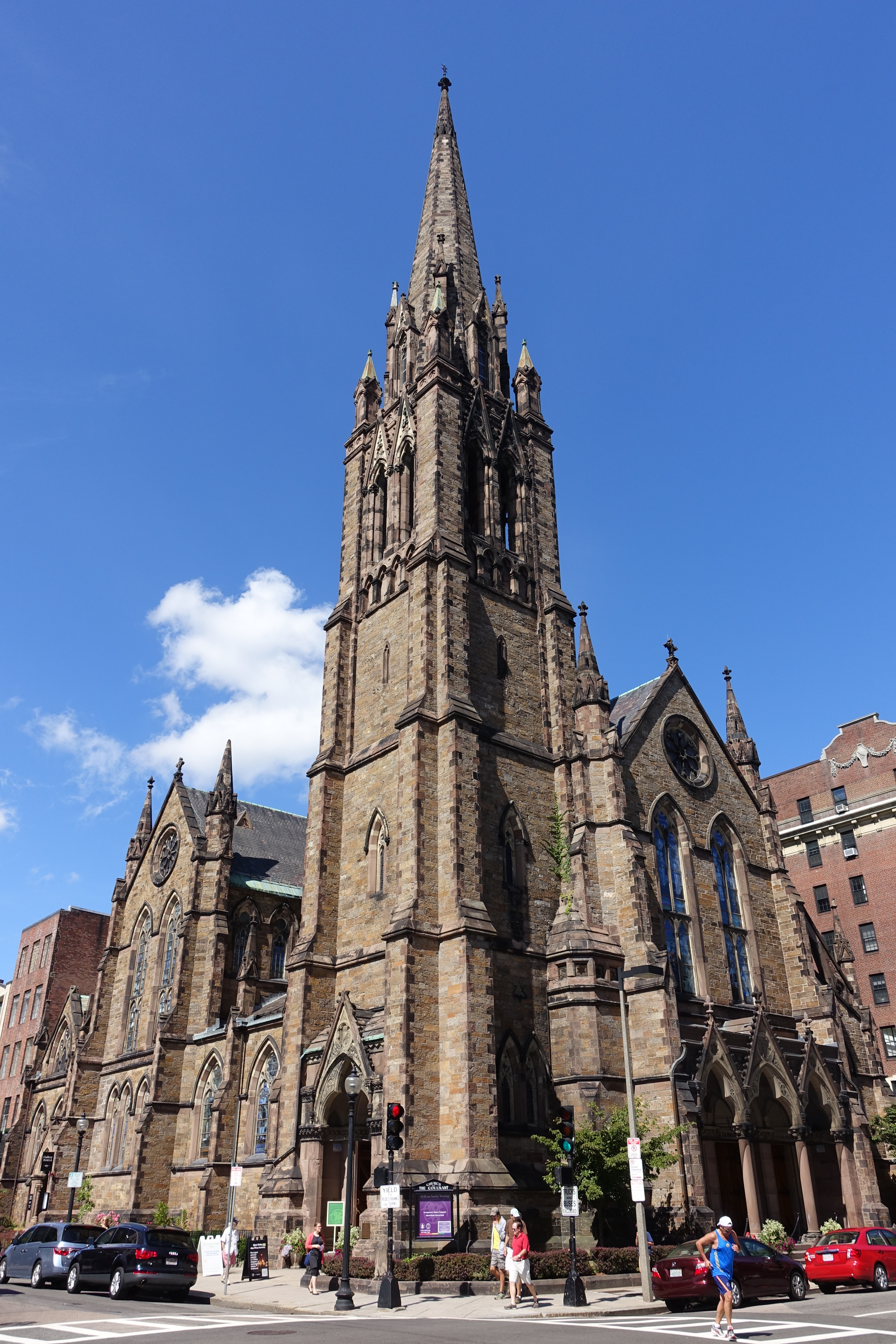
Central Congregational Church, built in 1867, now Church of the Covenant, in Boston

Coordinating missionary work was one of the primary functions of the National Council. Many of the National Council's affiliated societies were originally interdenominational when founded. Foreign missionary work was carried out by the American Board of Commissioners for Foreign Missions, an organization that predated the creation of the National Council. In 1928, the American Board sponsored 718 missionaries throughout the world.

Several missions agencies operated within the United States under the umbrella of the Church Extension Boards. The Congregational Home Missionary Society (org. 1826) was a church planting agency that as of 1930 was responsible for four out of every five American Congregational churches in existence. In 1927, the society sponsored 1,539 missionaries. The Congregational Church Building Society (org. 1853) raised funds for grants and loans to build churches and parsonages. The Congregational Sunday School Extension Society (org. 1917) was responsible for establishing and maintaining Sunday schools in addition to recruiting college students to staff them.

The American Missionary Association, which also predated the National Council, was primarily focused on education and evangelism among African Americans, Appalachian residents, Native Americans, and Mexican, Puerto Rican, Chinese and Japanese communities.

== Seminaries ==
- Atlanta Theological Seminary (org. 1901, absorbed into Vanderbilt University Divinity School in 1929)
- Bangor Theological Seminary
- Chicago Theological Seminary
- Hartford Seminary
- Pacific School of Religion

== Bibliography ==
- Bebbington, David W. (2005). The Dominance of Evangelicalism: The Age of Spurgeon and Moody. Downers Grove, Illinois: InterVarsity Press. ISBN 978-0830825837.
- Bendroth, Margaret (2015). The Last Puritans: Mainline Protestants and the Power of the Past. University of North Carolina Press. ISBN 9781469624013.
- Executive Committee of the National Council of the Congregational Churches of the United States (1928). The Congregational Year-Book: Statistics for 1928. New York: National Council of the Congregational Churches of the United States.
- Hood, E. Lyman (1901). The National Council of Congregational Churches in the United States. Boston, Massachusetts: Pilgrim Press.
- Qualben, Lars P. (2008) [1933]. A History of the Christian Church (revised ed.). Eugene, Oregon: Wipf and Stock Publishers. ISBN 978-1606081679.
- Youngs, J. William T. (1998). The Congregationalists. Denominations in America. Vol. 4 (Student ed.). Westport, Connecticut: Praeger. ISBN 9780275964412.
