= Kansas City Statement of Faith =

The Kansas City Statement of Faith is a 1913 confession of faith adopted by the National Council of the Congregational Churches of the United States at Kansas City, Missouri. This concise statement of Congregational beliefs restates traditional congregational polity and endorses ecumenism, while also displaying the drift away from Reformed theology that had occurred in American Congregationalism.

== Contents ==
American Congregationalists had adopted earlier confessional statements. The Savoy Declaration, a modified version of the Westminster Confession of Faith, had been in use in America since the 18th century and reflected an earlier commitment to Calvinist theology. The Kansas City Statement of Faith was crafted in 1913 to "affirm traditional congregationalist principles in a form that would meet the needs" of the 20th century. The statement is organized into three sections on "Faith", "Polity", and "Wider Fellowship".

The section on faith affirms belief in God the Father, Jesus Christ as lord and savior, and the Holy Spirit. The will of God is described as being found in the Bible. The mission of the church is described as proclaiming the gospel to all, worshiping God, and "laboring for the progress of knowledge, the promotion of justice, the reign of peace, and the realization of human brotherhood." It commits Congregationalists to "work and pray for the transformation of the world into the kingdom of God" and looks forward to the ultimate triumph of righteousness and everlasting life.

According to historian William Youngs, the section on faith "suggests the degree to which dogmatic Calvinism had disappeared from Congregationalism". Youngs notes that the statement lacks any mention of the means of grace, original sin or predestination.

Though the statement officially recognized the movement away from Puritan theology, its section on polity is largely consistent with early Puritan beliefs in the autonomy of the local church. In this section, congregational polity is affirmed. The statement also affirms the cooperation of churches together in district, state and national bodies (such as the National Council of Congregational Churches).

The section on "Wider Fellowship" endorses ecumenism and the efforts to achieve unity with other Christian denominations. This section reflects future initiatives of the Congregationalists to unite with other Christian denominations, ultimately culminating in the formation of the United Church of Christ in 1957.
