= Normans Kill =

Normans Kill Normanskill Creek
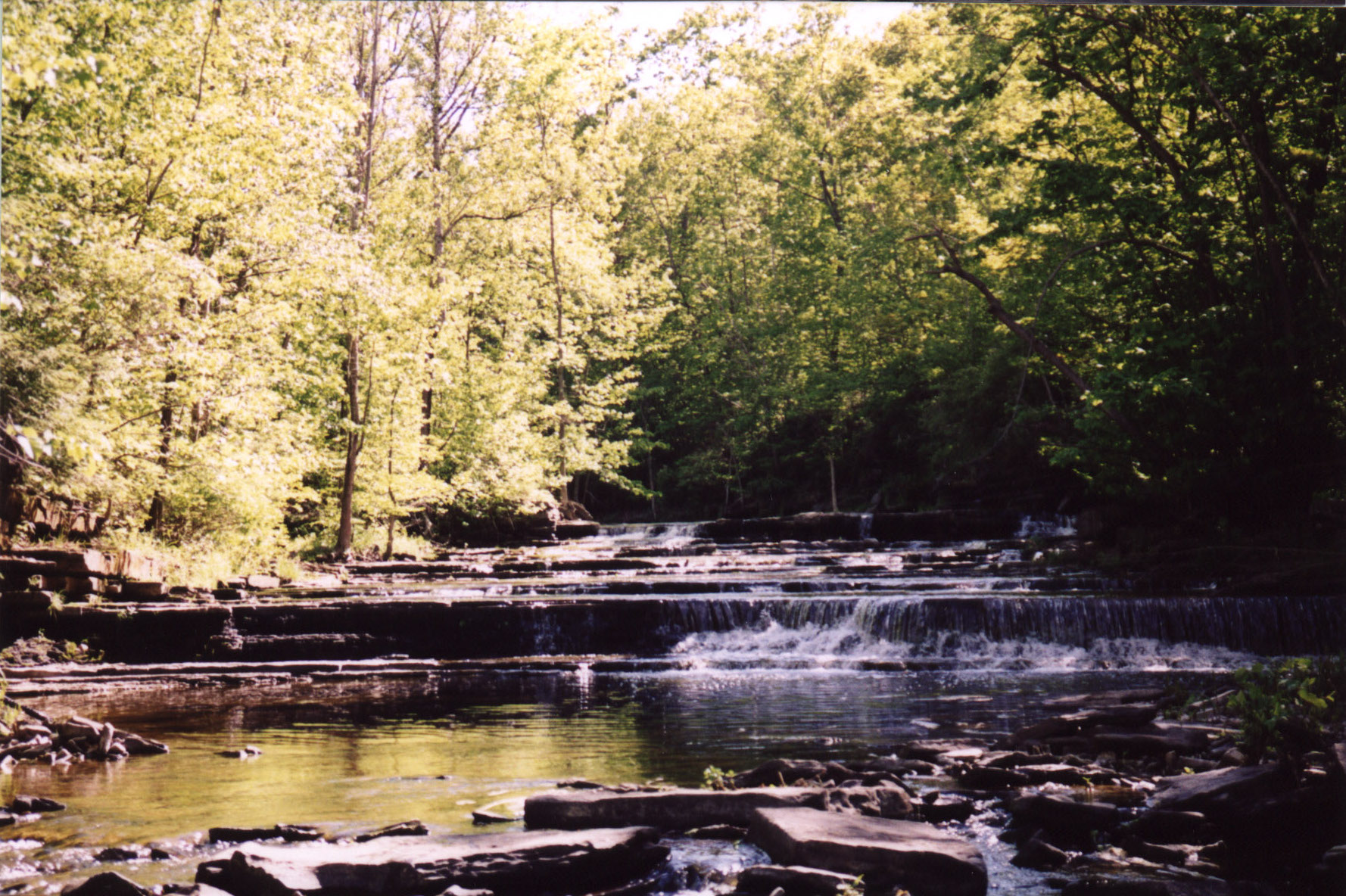
- Normanskill Creek in Duanesburg

- The Normans Kill basin encompasses parts of three counties.

Location
- Country: United States
- State: New York
- Region: Upstate New York
- Metropolitan area: Capital District
- Counties: Albany County; Schenectady County, Schoharie County

Physical characteristics
- Source: Darby Hill
  - location: Duanesburg, near Delanson, Schenectady County, New York
- Mouth: Hudson River
  - location: Bethlehem, Albany County, New York
  - elevation: 0 ft (0 m)
- Length: 45 mi (72 km)
- Basin size: 170 sq mi (440 km^{2})
- Discharge
  - average: 150 cu ft/s (4.2 m^{3}/s)

Basin features
- River system: Hudson River Watershed
- Tributaries
  - left: Hunger Kill, Krum Kill
  - right: Bozen Kill, Vly Creek

The Normans Kill is a 45.4-mile-long (73.1 km) creek in New York's Capital District located in Schenectady and Albany counties. It flows southeasterly from its source in the town of Duanesburg near Delanson to its mouth at the Hudson River in the town of Bethlehem. In the town of Guilderland, the stream is dammed to create the Watervliet Reservoir, a drinking water source for the city of Watervliet and the Town of Guilderland. A one megawatt hydrolectric plant at the dam provides power to pump water to the filtration plant.

The Normans Kill has a drainage area of over 170 square miles (440 km^{2}), and includes portions of Schoharie County along with the counties in which the Normans Kill itself flows through.

The Normans Kill has been used historically as a source of water power during colonial times, during which many mills sprung up along its banks. Prior to the Industrial Revolution, blocks of ice were cut out of the creek for shipment to the city of New York as a form of early refrigeration. Its name is derived from the Dutch word for a Norwegian, who the Dutch called "North Men or Normans", hence North Man's Stream/Creek" the ethnicity of Albert Andriessen Bradt (originally spelled "Bratt"), an early settler who owned sawmills near the first waterfall of the creek in the early 17th century, and the word kill, Dutch for creek. Earlier names of the stream include Godyns Kil, Norman's Kill, Normans Kil, and the indigenous place name Ta-wa-sen-tha, Ta-wal-sou-tha, or Tawalsontha. Locals call and spell it Normanskill (one word) Creek

== Geography ==
The Normans Kill is over 45 miles (72 km) long with a basin that is over 170 square miles (440 km^{2}). The last 1-mile (1.6 km) is tidal.

== History ==
Originally called "Tawasentha" (a place of the many dead), the Normans Kill is named for Albert Andriessen Bradt, a Norwegian immigrant to Rensselaerswyck. The creek is named for his Norwegian (Norman) heritage. He was one of the first Scandinavians to the Dutch colony of New Netherland. He was a tobacco planter and as such came to the area of the Normans Kill for that purpose. He proceeded to construct two sawmills along the Normans Kill.

== Tributaries ==
- Vly Creek - Vlaie meaning "swamp" in Dutch.
- Krum Kill
- Hunger Kill
  - East Branch Hunger Kill
  - Blockhouse Creek
    - Kaikout Kill
- Bozen Kill
  - Wolf Creek
- Bonny Brook
- Indian House Creek

I-os-co is the historical Native American name for a tributary of Normans Kill in Guilderland, but its current name is not known.

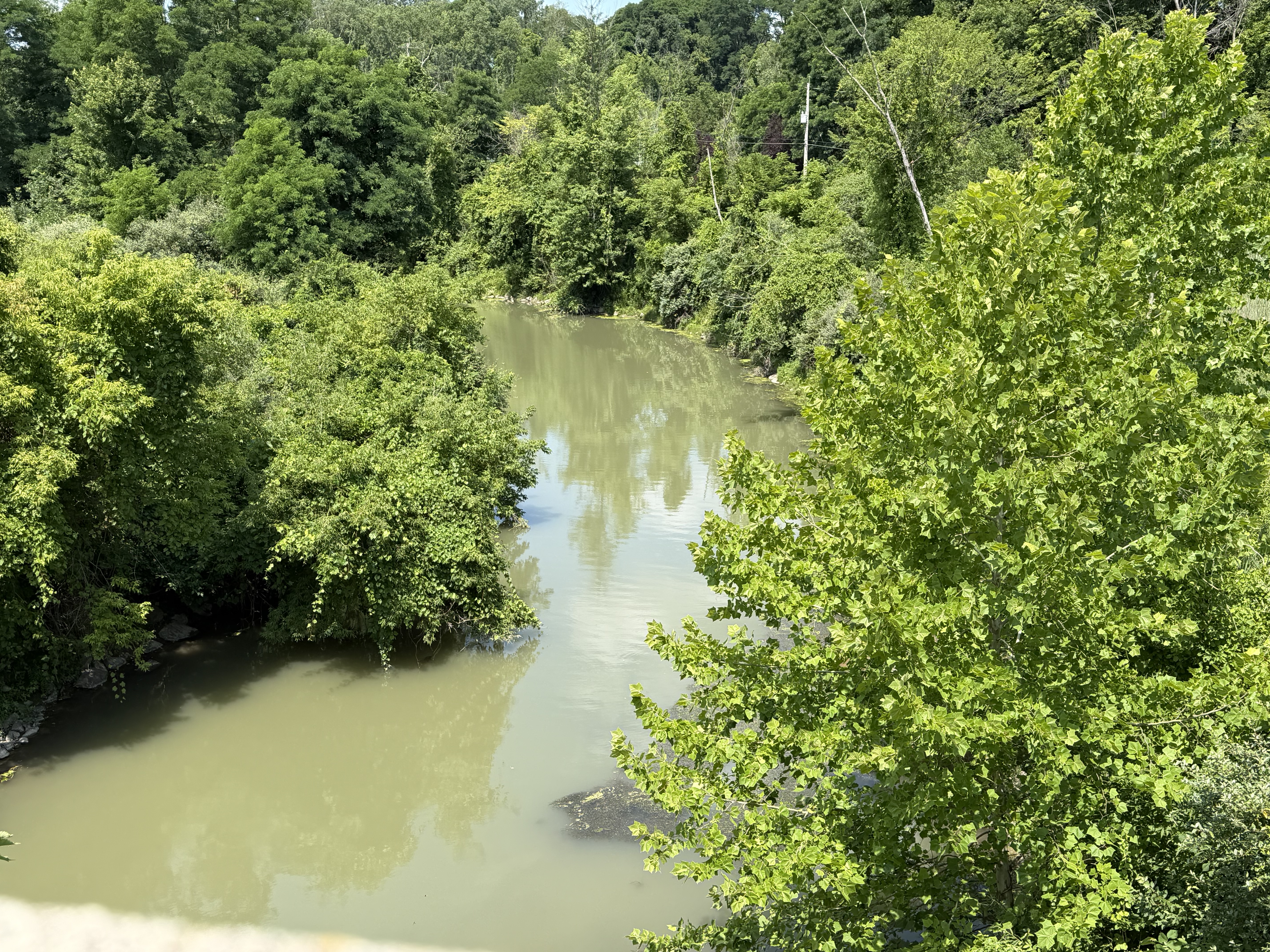
Normans Kill flowing under New Scotland Road, Albany NY

== See also ==
- List of rivers of New York
