= New Scotland Avenue (Troop B) Armory =

- U.S. National Register of Historic Places
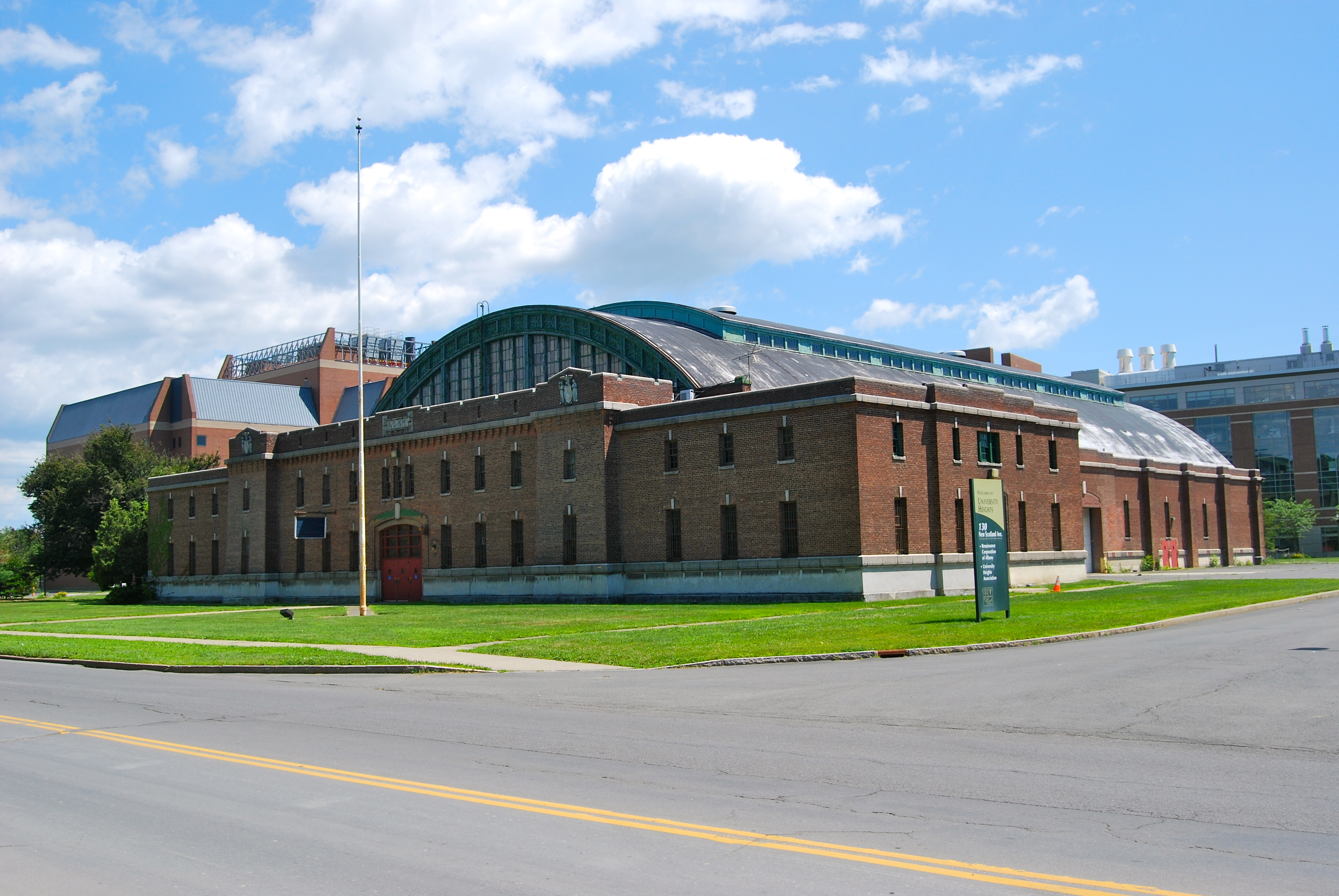
- North elevation and east profile, 2011

- Location within New York Location within the United States
- Location: Albany, NY
- Coordinates: 42°39′7″N 73°46′53″W
- Area: 3 acres (1.2 ha)
- Built: 1914
- Architect: Lewis Pilcher
- Architectural style: Tudor Revival
- MPS: Army National Guard Armories in New York State MPS
- NRHP reference No.: 93001536
- Added to NRHP: January 28, 1994

The New Scotland Avenue (Troop B) Armory is located on New Scotland Avenue in Albany, New York, United States. It is a large brick building constructed in the early 20th century. In 1994 it was listed on the National Register of Historic Places, one of two armories in the city of Albany to be so designated.

Designed by Lewis Pilcher, it is one of only six extant armories in the state designed for cavalry units of the New York National Guard. Its restrained Tudor Revival architecture was a break from the more fortress-like armories of the late 19th century. It continued to be used by units of the New York National Guard for most of the 20th century. Today it is the office of the University Heights Association, which owns much of the nearby land, and other community organizations and businesses.

== Building ==
The armory is located in Albany's University Heights neighborhood. It is on a three-acre (1.2 ha) lot on the south side of New Scotland Avenue a short distance east of its intersection with South Lake and Woodlawn avenues on the north side. Its immediate neighborhood is dominated by similarly large-scale institutional buildings, mostly related to health care. The campus of Sage College of Albany is on the south and west, with the five-story tower of the David Axelrod Institute for Public Health, a laboratory facility of the state Department of Health's Wadsworth Center, is surrounded by a parking lot on the east. The large campus of the Capital District Psychiatric Center is across the street, next to Albany Medical Center Hospital to the northeast. Outside of this enclave, the surrounding neighborhood is residential, giving way to the Washington Park Historic District, the city's largest, three blocks to the northeast.

The building itself is a T-shaped steel frame structure on a parged concrete foundation with walls faced in brick above a granite water table. A two-story, 13-bay front administration building with a flat roof is joined to a structurally similar barrel vaulted 3 1/2-story drill shed. There is also a single-story former stable wing with a hipped roof projecting east from the southeast corner.

Two corner bastions set off the middle seven bays of the administration building's north (front) facade from the wings on either side. At its roofline is a machicolated brick cornice with a stone belt course topped by crenelated parapets with rifle slits and stone coping. In the field of the shallow pediment at either bastion is a high-relief stone carving of the state seal. They are complemented by the initials "N.G.N.Y." carved into stone blocks below a slightly higher section of parapet at the center, above the main entrance.

All windows are set in recessed surrounds with stone sills, flared-brick lintels and stone keystones. They are nine-over-nine double-hung sash on the first story and six-over-six on the second. The first story windows are further distinguished by iron protective bars. Above the segmental-arched main entrance there are three windows. The east and west facades have similar fenestration, five bays deep with the middle three in a slightly projecting pavilion. In the middle of the first floor is a segmental-arched entrance with a tall double door topped by transom lights.

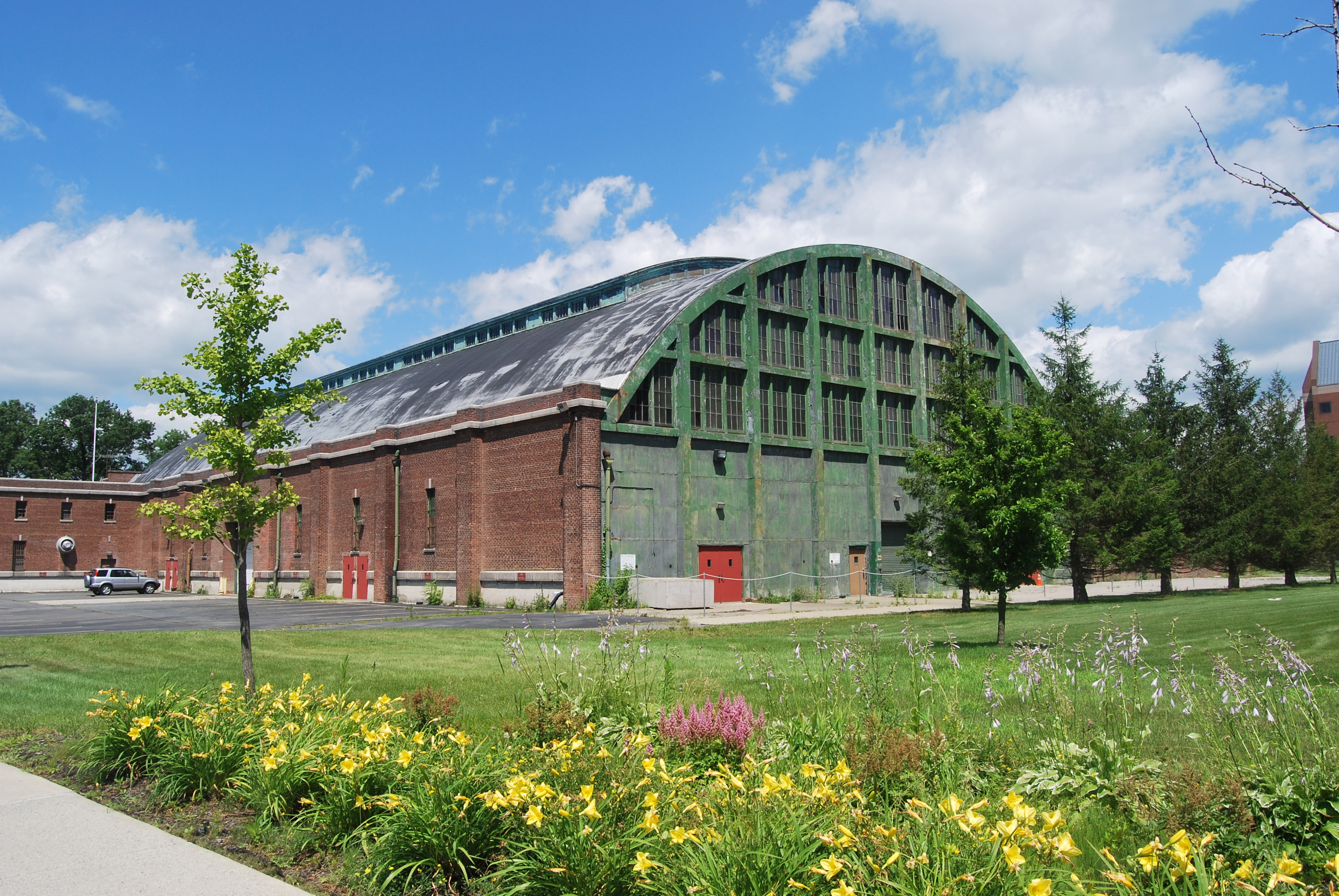
South (rear) facade

The west facade of the drill shed has five bays, set apart by brick pilasters. Fenestration is the same as the first floor of the administration building; the southernmost bay is blank. Two paired modern entrances are located in the third bay from the south and the one closest to the admin building. On either end of the shed are banks of multi-paned windows; a clerestory with seven banks of similar windows tops the roof curve. There are several modern entrances in the south end.

The stable wing's hipped roof has cross-gabling and shed dormer windows. Most of its windows are the same nine-over-nine double-hung sash as those on the first floor of the other sections. Several large stable doors have been bricked over.

Inside the building is largely plain, with minimal decoration, as it was originally constructed. Many of the offices and the entire interior of the stable wing have been extensively altered. The company meeting room has a brick fireplace mantel and the interior of the drill shed retains its original exposed roof trusses.

== History ==
It has not been determined exactly when Troop B was established. Records show that as of 1889 it was assigned to the Washington Avenue Armory closer to Albany's downtown. It shared that building with four infantry units, and it could not have been an ideal location for a cavalry unit since there was insufficient space to drill with or board horses. By the early 20th century, improvements in local transportation made it possible to use previously outlying locations, and the current armory was built.

Lewis Pilcher, then New York's state architect, designed the building. Aesthetically, it represented a move away from the more fortress-like Gothic and medieval military architecture which characterized many earlier armories located in urban cores toward a more restrained application of the Tudor Revival architectural style. The armory is one of only six extant in the state designed for a cavalry unit.

Shortly after moving into the armory, Troop B saw service in World War I as a machine gun company. In 1950 Troop B was taken over by the 106th Anti-Aircraft Artillery Battalion (10th Regiment), which became the 127th over the course of the following decade. In 1960 it became the First Battalion of the 210th Armor and remained so until that unit was deactivated in 1993.

B Company of the First Battalion of the 101st Cavalry and various other detachments used the building during the six years before the state Division of Military and Naval Affairs closed and sold it in 1999. During that time archeological investigations in the vicinity found that it had once been the burial ground for Albany's poor, and many bodies were exhumed. Since its closure it has been home to several businesses and the University Heights Association (UHA), which oversees the campuses in the area.

The Marty and Dorothy Silverman Foundation originally bought the property and leased it to the UHA. It gave the organization $14 million to buy the 31 acres (13 ha) in the vicinity that it leased to Sage and the other institutions. Litigation ensued in 2005 when the foundation and the UHA disagreed over whether the money had been a gift or a loan. After the UHA went bankrupt, the suit was settled with an agreement under which the armory property reverted to the foundation. In 2011, the foundation sued another buyer near bankruptcy, alleging misrepresentation during the original negotiations.

== See also ==
- National Register of Historic Places listings in Albany, New York
