= Krum Kill =

Stream in New York, U.S.

Coordinates: 42°38′56″N 73°50′50″W

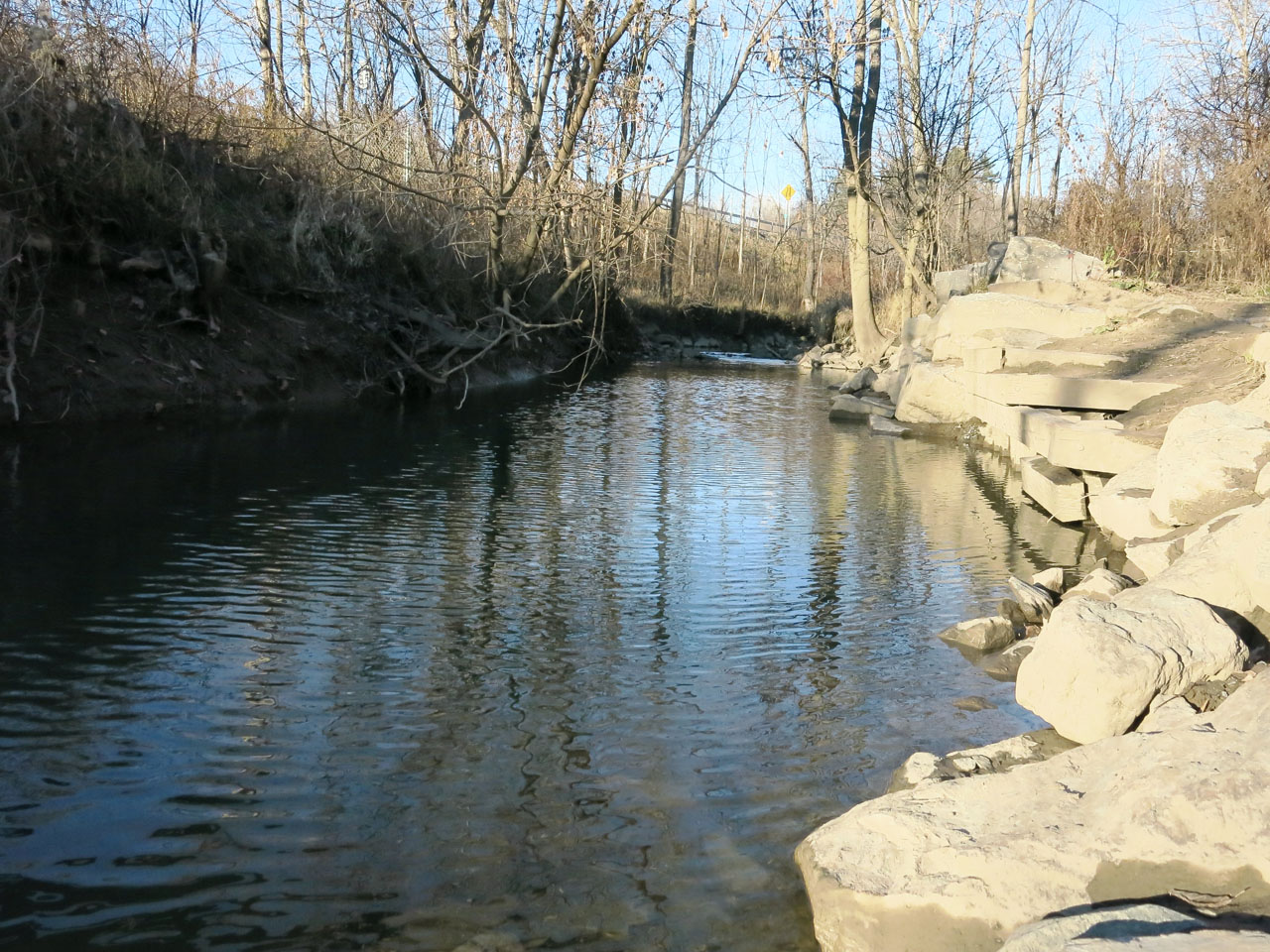
Krum Kill Creek in Albany

Krum Kill is a stream in the U.S. state of New York.

"Krum" most likely is derived from Dutch meaning "crooked".

The Krum Kill proper starts in the location of the campus of the State University of New York at Albany, in the vicinity of what is called Indian Pond.

Another creek originates a short distance west of there, near Crossgates Mall, and merges with the Krum Kill near the boundary between the Town of Guilderland and the City of Albany. Locally, both creeks are commonly referred to as the Krum Kill, sometimes as the north and south, or east and west branches.

The Krum Kill ends where it feeds into the Normans Kill in the Slingerlands hamlet in the Town of Bethlehem.
