= Hudson River Way =

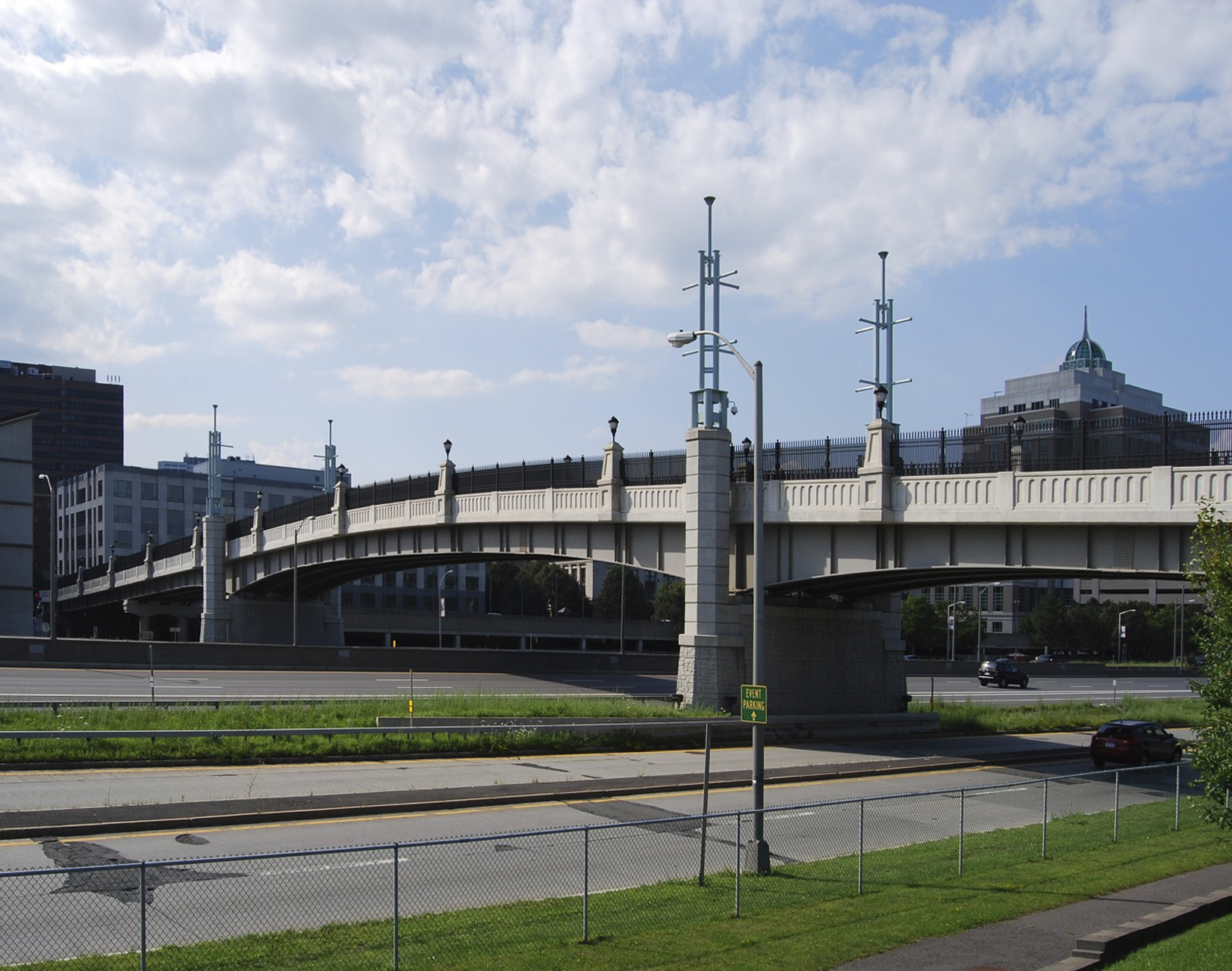
- View of southern side
- Coordinates: 42°38′59″N 73°44′54″W
- Carries: Pedestrians and Cyclists
- Crosses: Interstate 787 and Canadian Pacific Railway
- Locale: Albany, New York

Characteristics
- Total length: 650 feet (198.12 m)
- Width: 24 feet (7.3152 m)

History
- Opened: August 10, 2002

The Hudson River Way is a 2002 pedestrian bridge that links Broadway in downtown Albany, New York with the Corning Preserve on the bank of the Hudson River. The bridge crosses Interstate 787.

== History ==
The Hudson River Way was intended to spark downtown and riverfront growth in Albany. The bridge's 8.5 million dollar cost was covered by the municipal government, the New York State Department of Transportation ($3.3 million including an Intermodal Surface Transportation Efficiency Act grant), and over 11,000 individuals, businesses, and other organizations who purchased personalized bricks to support the bridge's construction, which started in April 2001. These bricks now pave the structure. The grand opening was on August 10, 2002.

== Murals ==
The bridge has thirty concrete nine-foot obelisk-lampposts that feature trompe-l'œil still-life paintings by AlbanyMural Ltd. The Hudson River Way paintings were awarded the Americans for the Arts Public Art Network Award in 2004 for exceptional quality.

Sponsored by individuals and organizations, each mural depicts a historical period or event in Albany's history, from prehistoric times to the present. Many of the paintings are based on archaeological artifacts in area museums. Research for the composition of the paintings took 18 months and involved dozens of experts and historians from across the Capital District. The paintings themselves took two years to complete and were executed by principal artist Jan-Marie Spanard and assistant artist Koren Lazarou.

The paintings are made of a permanent pigment called potassium silicate. This same material has been used on exterior architecture in Western Europe since the mid-19th century and around the world in the past half-century. Very few American artists create paintings with potassium silicate mineral coatings, but these are the only pigments that can be applied to a stone or concrete substrate that will last indefinitely without fading or lifting from the surface. The Potassium silicate paints used on the Hudson River Way were produced by a German company called Keimfarben. By 2018, however, many of the murals had faded.
