= American Congregational Union =

The American Congregational Union was formed in 1853 to promote Congregationalism in the United States, primarily through the construction of Congregational churches. In 1892, its name was changed to the Congregational Church Building Society. It was an agency of the National Council of Congregational Churches.

By 1893, they had assisted in the creation of 2,340 churches in the western US. They later shifted their efforts towards the creation of urban churches and serving immigrant populations.
