= Bloodgood (surname) =

Bloodgood is a surname. Notable people with the surname include:

- Frans Jansen Bloetgoet (c. 1632–1676), Dutch emigrant to Flushing, NY and progenitor of the American Bloodgood family
- Al Bloodgood (1901–1947), American football player
- Clara Bloodgood (1868–1907), American stage actress and socialte
- Claude Bloodgood (1937–2001), American chess player and convicted murderer
- Joseph Colt Bloodgood (1867–1935), American surgeon
- Joseph Wheeler Bloodgood (1926–1960), American judge and politician
- Katherine Bloodgood (1871–1967), American contralto singer and vaudeville performer
- Moon Bloodgood (born 1975), American actress and model

== Fictional ==
- Headless Headmistress Bloodgood, daughter of the Headless Horseman from Monster High
