= History of Albany, New York (1784–1860) =

The history of Albany, New York, from 1784 to 1860, begins with the ratification of the Treaty of Paris by the Congress of the Confederation in 1784 and ends in 1860, prior to the American Civil War.

After the Revolutionary War, Albany County saw a great increase in real estate transactions. After Horatio Gates' win over John Burgoyne at Saratoga in 1777, the upper Hudson Valley was generally at peace as the war raged on elsewhere. Prosperity was soon seen all over Upstate New York. Migrants from Vermont and Connecticut began flowing in, noting the advantages of living on the Hudson and trading at Albany, while being only a few days' sail from New York City. Albany reported a population of 3,498 in the first national census in 1790, an increase of almost 700% since its chartering. In 1797, the state capital of New York was moved permanently to Albany. From statehood to this date, the Legislature had frequently moved the state capital between Albany, Kingston, Poughkeepsie, and the city of New York. Albany is the second oldest state capital in the United States.

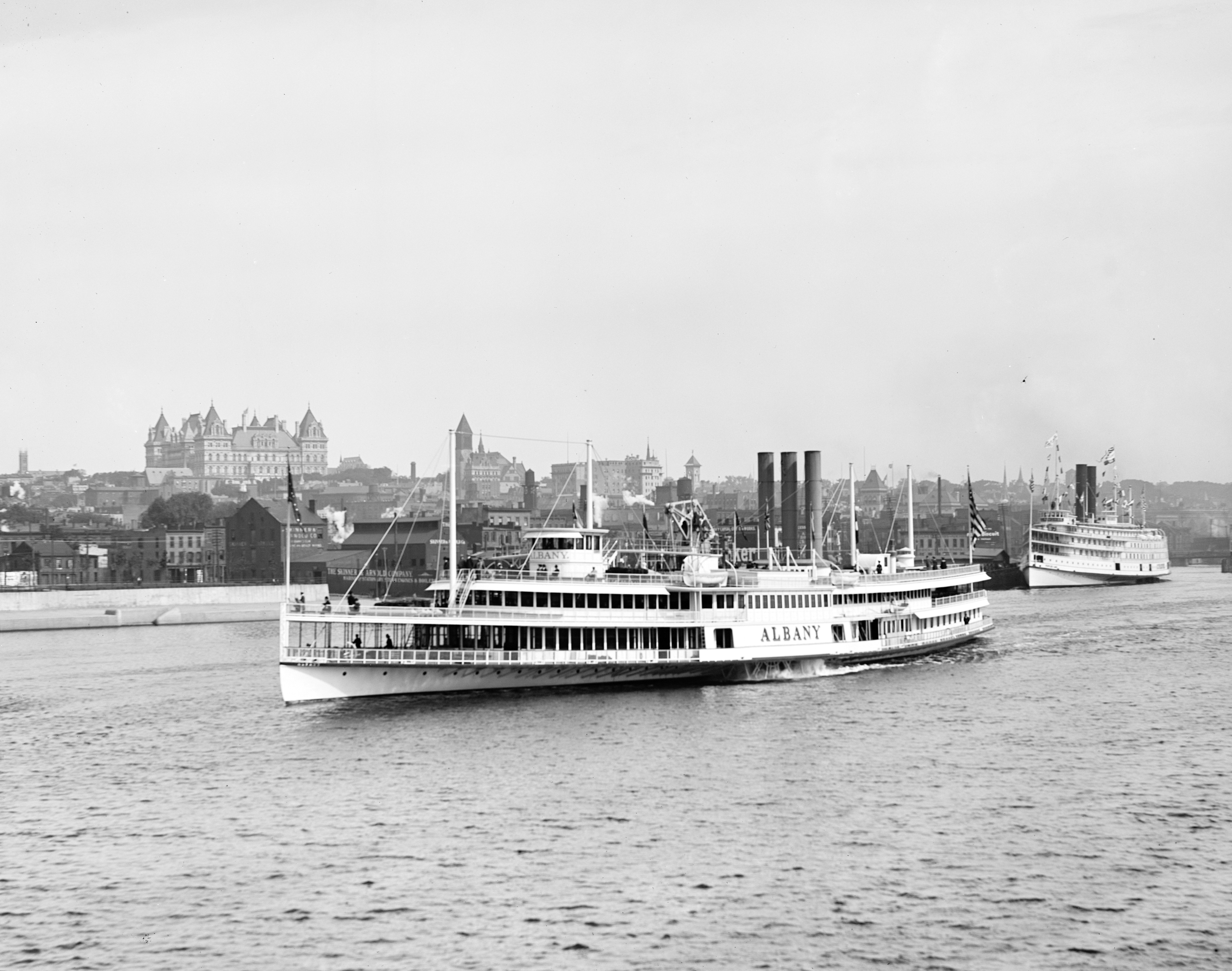
The steamer Albany departs for New York City; at the height of steam travel in 1884, more than 1.5 million passengers took the trip.

Albany has been a center of transportation for much of its history. In the late 18th century and early 19th century, Albany saw development of the turnpike and by 1815, Albany was the turnpike center of the state. The development of Simeon De Witt's gridded block system in 1794—which gave Albany its original bird and mammal street names, (Note: A rough grid pattern was established in 1764, aligning the streets with Clinton Avenue, which marked the northern border of Albany at the time. Patroon of the Manor of Rensselaerswyck Stephen Van Rensselaer II followed the same directional system north of Clinton Avenue on his lands, however, the two systems were not related otherwise, which is why cross streets north and south of Clinton Avenue do not align. The stockade surrounding the city was taken down shortly before the Revolutionary War, allowing for expansion. De Witt, city surveyor at the time, continued the grided pattern to the west and renamed any streets that honored British Royalty on his 1794 map. Hawk Street is the only road that retained its original name; the rest were named after birds and mammals.)—was intersected by these important arterials coming out of Albany, cutting through the city at unexpected angles. The advent of the turnpike, in conjunction with canal and railroad systems, made Albany the hub of transportation for pioneers going to Buffalo and the Michigan Territory in the early and mid-19th century.

In 1807, Robert Fulton initiated a steamboat line from New York to Albany, the first successful enterprise of its kind. By 1810, with 10,763 people, Albany was the 10th largest urban place in the nation. The town and village known as "the Colonie" (Note: "The Colonie" made up the current area of Arbor Hill and was the more urban part of the Manor of Rensselaerswyck, which surrounded Albany. It is the source of the name of the current town and village of Colonie.) to the north of Albany was annexed in 1815. In 1825 the Erie Canal was completed, forming a continuous water route from the Great Lakes to New York City. Unlike the current Barge Canal, which ends at nearby Waterford, the original Erie Canal ended at Albany; Lock 1 was located north of Colonie Street. The Canal emptied into a 32-acre (13 ha) man-made lagoon called the Albany Basin, which was Albany's main port from 1825 until the Port of Albany-Rensselaer opened in 1932. In 1829, while working as a professor at the Albany Academy, Joseph Henry, widely regarded as "the foremost American scientist of the 19th century", built the first electric motor. Three years later, he discovered electromagnetic self-induction (the SI unit for which is now the henry). He went on to be the first Secretary of the Smithsonian Institution. In the 1830 and 1840 censuses, Albany moved up to 9th largest urban place in the nation, then back to 10th in 1850. This was the last time the city was one of the top ten largest urban places in the nation.

Albany also has significant history with rail transport, as the location of two major regional railroad headquarters. The Delaware and Hudson Railway was headquartered in Albany at what is now the SUNY System Administration Building. In 1853, Erastus Corning, a noted industrialist and Albany's mayor from 1834 to 1837, consolidated ten railroads stretching from Albany to Buffalo into the New York Central Railroad (NYCRR), headquartered in Albany until Cornelius Vanderbilt moved it to New York City in 1867. One of the ten companies that formed the NYCRR was the Mohawk and Hudson Railroad, which was the first railroad in the state and the first successful steam railroad running regularly scheduled service in the country.

== 1784–1800 ==
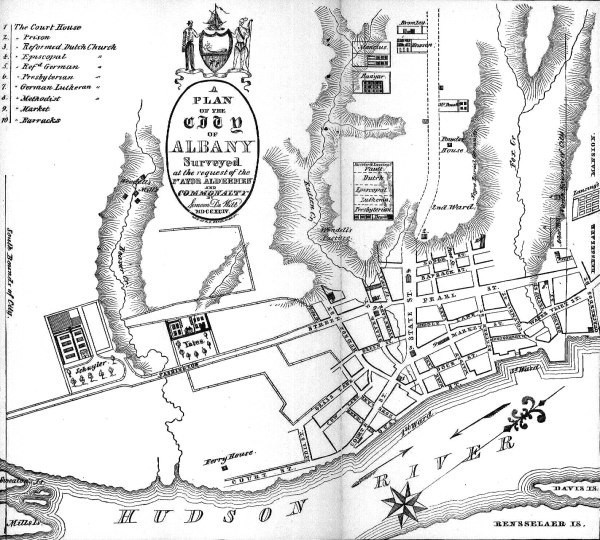
1790 map of Albany by Simeon De Witt

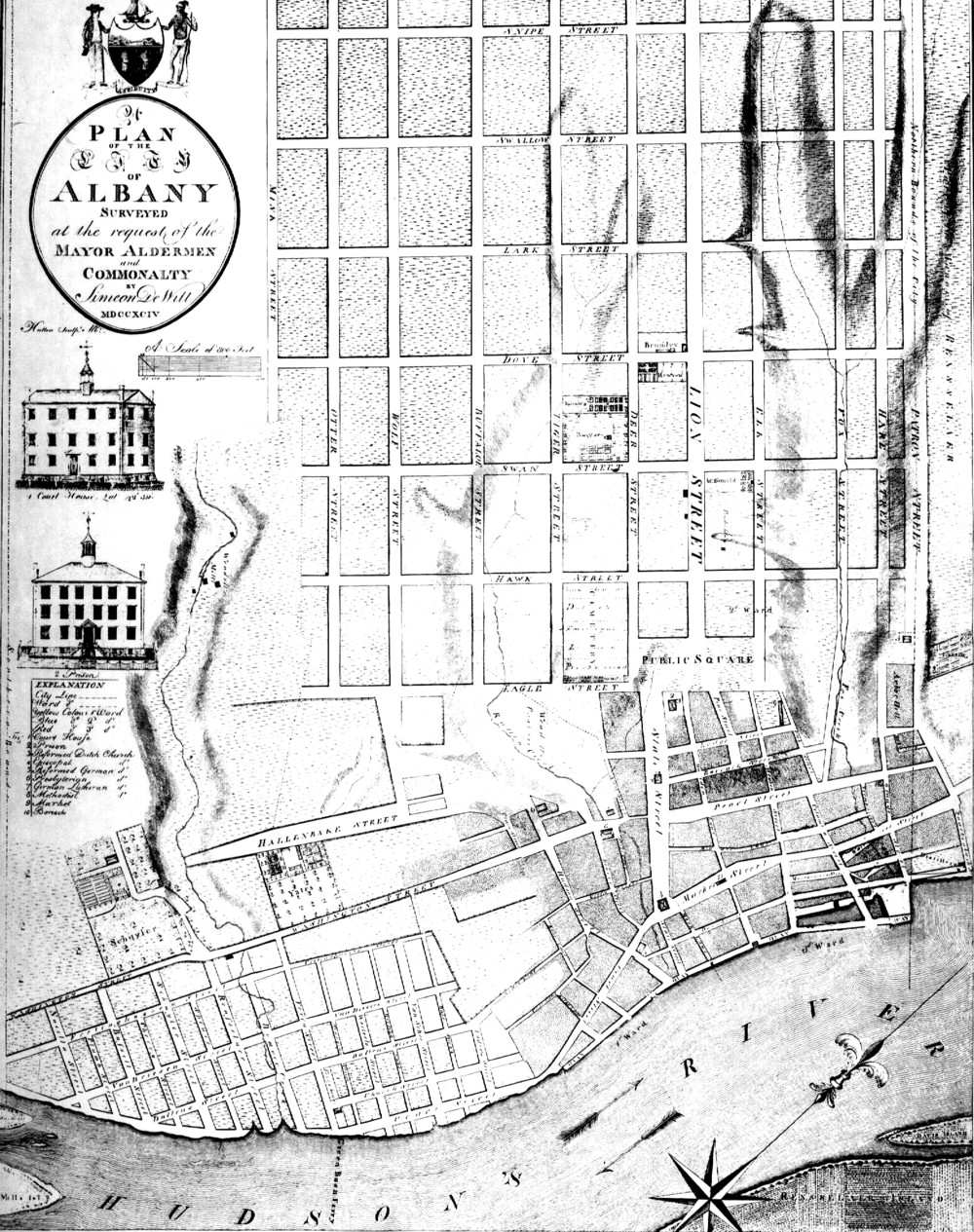
Albany's 1794 plan for future street grid, by Simeon De Witt

After the American Revolution, Albany began to grow both physically and commercially, but also culturally. The first post office in Albany was established in 1784 on the east side of Broadway, north of Maiden Lane. In 1785 the Common Council ordered to change the names of any streets that seemed to "savor of the English rule" and Fort Frederick was demolished, which allowed for further expansion of the city to the west. Also in 1785, the sloop Experiment left Albany for China, being only the second American ship to go to China, and the first expressly built for that purpose. A regular schedule of comedic acts were performed for several months in 1786, the first time comedians performed in Albany. John Lansing Jr. became mayor in that year as well.

In 1788 and 1789 stage lines are established linking Albany to Lansingburgh, New York and Springfield, Massachusetts, prior to this the only stagecoach service was to New York. This is the very beginning of Albany's rise as a transportation hub, stage lines being an early version of intercity bus lines. In 1791 stage coach mail route is established to Bennington, Vermont and a stage line is started to Oneida County in 1792. In the following few years, stage lines are established with the surrounding communities and beyond, such as Ballston in 1793 and to Buffalo and Niagara Falls in 1811. Within ten years turnpikes would start to radiate out from Albany to surrounding communities and farther.

The first national census was taken in 1790 and the city was shown to have 3,498 people. Albany County had 75,180 people, making it larger than the next two largest counties combined, New York and Dutchess counties. Also in 1790, the street names were officially changed, east–west streets named for mammals and north–south streets for birds; most of the bird named streets continue to today with their names from this time, while the mammal streets, except for Elk, are changed over the course of time. Abraham Yates Jr. was appointed mayor in this year as well. Congress authorized the construction of a post road from Albany to Canajoharie through Schenectady. The Albany Library was incorporated in 1791 as well as the Bank of Albany. In 1797 the Albany Museum was incorporated.

Emigration from New England to the western part of the state increased as roads were improved west of Albany. By 1795, 500 sleighs a day were passing through Albany in February on their way from New England states to the west. On the death of Mayor Yates, Abraham Ten Broeck was appointed mayor a second time.

In 1797, the state capital of New York was moved permanently to Albany. From statehood to this date the legislature spent roughly equal time constantly moving between Albany, Kingston, Poughkeepsie, and the city of New York. Also in 1797 the Ten Broeck Mansion was completed by Stephen Van Rensselaer for his brother-in-law Mayor Ten Broeck. Later that year he was replaced by Philip Van Rensselaer. A State Capitol, jointly used as City Hall, was finished at the corner of State and Lodge streets.

== Transportation hub to the west (1800–1830) ==
The era of turnpikes in Albany started with the incorporation of the Great Western Turnpike Company in 1799. The Great Western Turnpike (today Western Avenue and US Route 20) connected Albany with the Finger Lakes and eventually Lake Erie at the site of Buffalo. Various other corporations soon started to connect Albany to various places: Lebanon Springs in 1799, Schenectady in 1801, Bethlehem in 1804, Albany and Delaware in 1805. In 1803 the second bank chartered in Albany, the New York State Bank, opened. In 1807, Robert Fulton initiated a steamboat line from New York to Albany; this was the first commercially viable steamboat in the world.

In 1804 Aaron Burr, who had a law office in Albany at 24 South Pearl Street, came into conflict with Alexander Hamilton. At 50 State Street, the home of John Tayler (later Lt. Governor and acting-Governor of the state), Hamilton made disparaging remarks about Burr and these were published in a local newspaper.

A new building was constructed at the Public Square in 1808 at the head of State Street to be used jointly as the State Capitol and City Hall, just as the previous capitol/city hall on Broadway and Hudson Avenue. In 1810 Middle Public Square has its name changed to Washington Square; this and the cemetery next to it which was established a few years before are the genesis of the present-day Washington Park.

By 1810 Albany, with 10,763 people, was the 10th largest city in the nation. The city continues to prosper and grow, adding new buildings, institutions, and people. In 1813 The Albany Academy is incorporated, the Albany Argus newspaper is established, two more banks apply for charters, and the grand opening of the Green Street theatre (first professional theater in Albany). The next year sees the opening of the Albany Academy for Girls. The city in 1815 annexes the village of Colonie, today it is the neighborhood of Arbor Hill. In 1816 a petition is started to get the Legislature to construct a canal from Albany to Lake Erie. After 17 years Mayor Van Rensselaer is removed from office for political reasons, and Colonel Elisha Jenkins becomes mayor of the city in 1816.

In 1817 slavery comes to a gradual end in Albany as the Legislature decides that all slaves in the state born before July 4, 1797, will be emancipated on July 4, 1827, and all slaves born after July 4, 1797, will be emancipated at age 28 for males, 25 for females. A month later the Legislature authorizes the construction of an Erie canal. Also in 1817 Martin Van Buren establishes his law firm, it is located at 111 State Street, then moves to 353 Broadway, and then in 1822 to 109 State Street. The New York State Library is established in 1818 inside the Capitol.

Philip Van Rensselaer returns to office in 1819 after Mayor Jenkins resigns. In 1819 the city is built up only one mile west of the Hudson, beyond that is the Pine Bush, today the Pine Bush Preserve does not begin until five miles (8 km) out from the Hudson. Theodric Romeyn Beck performs a comprehensive agricultural and geological survey of Albany County in 1820, it is the first in the state. Also in 1820 a chamber of commerce is established at Albany. The Common Council takes over the right to appoint the mayor and in 1821 unanimously elects Charles Edward Dudley. In Albany William Charles Redfield proposes that hurricanes are circular rotational vortices.

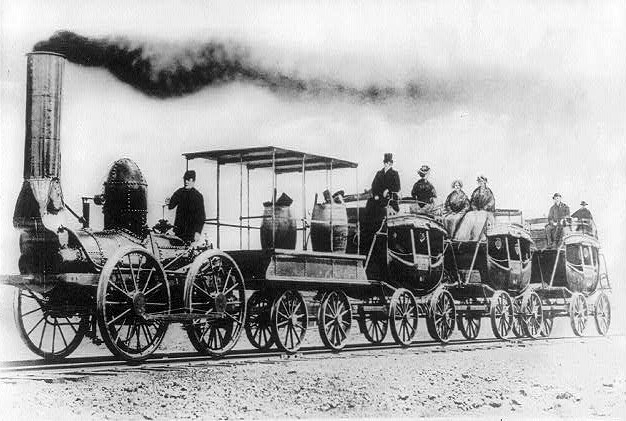
The DeWitt Clinton, first train in New York, ran from Albany to Schenectady.

In 1823 the Federal Dam at Troy is finished with a lock allowing for river navigation above Troy to Lansingburgh and Waterford. Throughout 1824 from January 1 to March 7 the Common Council meets trying to vote out the mayor in favor of Ambrose Spencer, but several times deadlocks 11-11, finally on March 8 on the second ballot of that day Ambrose Spencer is elected on a vote of 11 for, 10 against, and one blank. He is only the third Episcopalian mayor and non-Dutch Reformed, in 1825 he will be reelected unanimously. The Albany Institute, the predecessor to the Albany Institute of History and Art is incorporated in 1824. In 1825, a 4,300-foot (1,300 m) long and 80-foot (24 m) wide pier was constructed 250 feet (76 m) from, and perpendicular to, Albany's shoreline. Along with two bridges, the pier enclosed roughly 32 acres (130,000 m^{2}) of the Hudson River as the Albany Basin. The construction of the pier and bridges cost $119,980. The Erie Canal opens officially and the Seneca Chief leaves Buffalo on October 26, arriving at Albany on November 2. James Stevenson is elected by the Common Council in 1826, this is the first time in which an Episcopalian succeeds an Episcopalian as mayor of Albany. The Mohawk and Hudson Railroad (M&H), chartered in 1826, builds the Albany and Schenectady Railroad between those two cities, starting service on August 9, 1831, this is the first railway in the state.

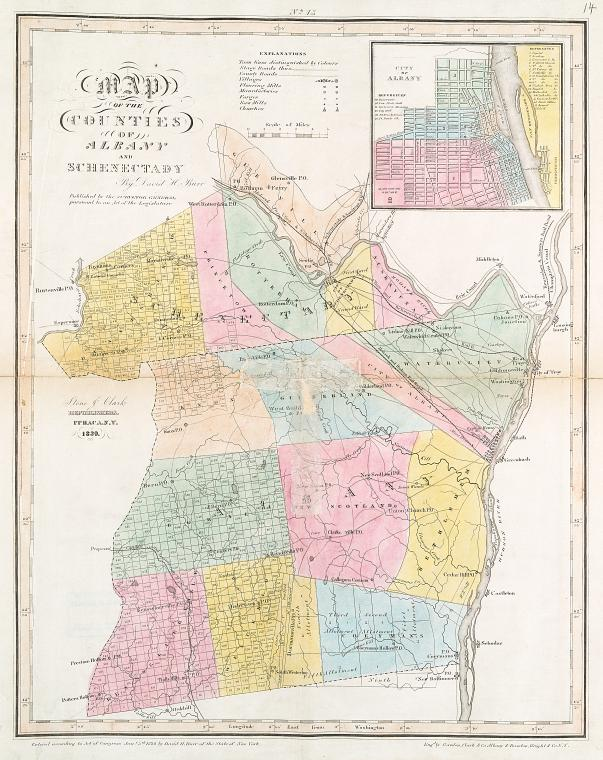
Map of Albany and Schenectady counties in 1829

The last public execution in Albany occurs on August 24, 1826. Jesse Strang is hanged for the murder of John Whipple at the Cherry Hill Mansion, beyond the city line then but today a museum within the city's South End. He is hung on what was Hudson Street (Avenue), at a location now within the Empire State Plaza. Charles Dudley returns to the office on the resignation of Mayor Stevenson, this returns a Dutch Reformed mayor after two Episcopalians, and Dudley's fourth time as mayor, but resigns in 1829 to become a United States senator. John Townsend replaces him and becomes the first Presbyterian mayor of Albany, Albany becoming less dominated by Dutch descendants. Also in 1829 Joseph Henry at The Albany Academy demonstrates the idea behind electromagnets, induction, generators, and the electric telegraph but fails to patent any idea or invention, only publishing scientific papers, allowing others such as Samuel Morse to patent the same inventions years later.

== 1830–1860 ==
Francis Bloodgood, of Dutch Reformed faith, becomes mayor in 1831 and pays all the debts of those in debtors' prison on the occasion of his swearing-in. A City Hall is erected on Eagle Street, between Maiden Lane and Pine Street, the location of the current City Hall. It is made of marble and capped by a gilded dome. John Townsend returns as mayor in 1832. Summer of that year sees a cholera epidemic in Albany. Out of a population of about 26,000 there are 387 who become infected and 136 die just in July, with the last death of cholera in this epidemic recorded in September. Also in 1832 in order for Hudson Avenue to be extended west with the growing city the Rutten Kill is filled in between Eagle and Hawk streets (today part of the Empire State Plaza), having already been covered east of Eagle by Hudson Avenue. In 1833 Francis Bloodgood becomes mayor for the second time. Prior to 1833 the Mohawk and Hudson Railroad ended at the junction of Western and Madison avenues, starting in 1833 the tracks were extended to State Street within 50 feet (15 m) of Eagle Street but the cars were pulled by horses for fear that locomotives could start buildings on fire or spook horses on the streets. At this time less than a handful of streets are opened as far west as Swan Street, some have been expanded out to Hawk, and most streets don't go past Eagle, except on paper, even Eagle Street is not open from Hudson to Madison avenues. The house that is farthest south in the city limits at this point is at the corner of Grand and Hamilton streets.

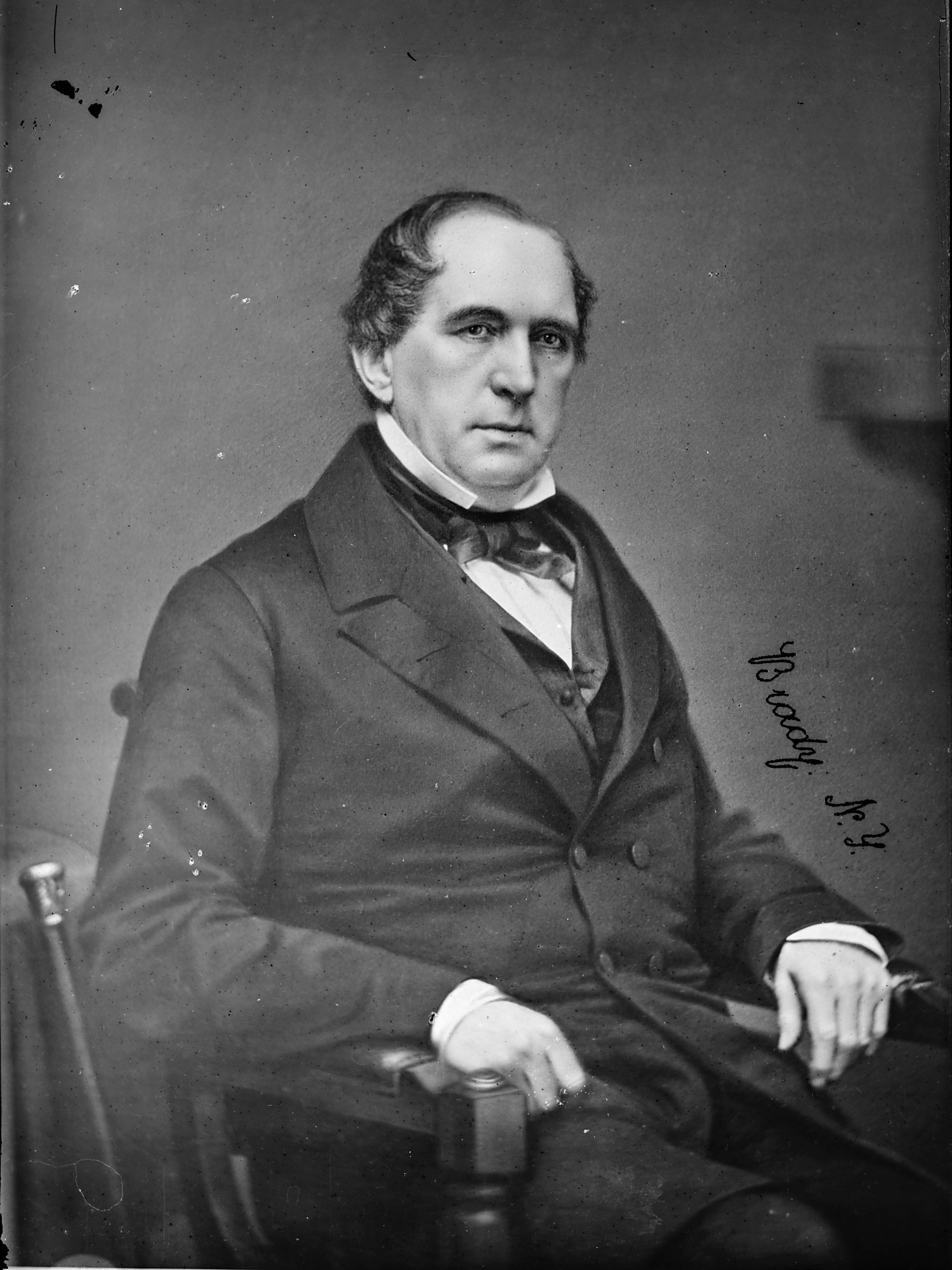
Erastus Corning, Mayor of Albany.

In 1834 Erastus Corning is elected mayor by the Common Council. Cholera breaks out again this year, from August 11 to September 16, 19 people die. Teunis Van Vechten, of Dutch Reformed faith, takes office of mayor in 1837. On November 9, 1837, the Albany Evening Journal displays on its newspaper an eagle stretching across the top; this is used or loaned to the Albany Argus throughout the next 50 years, it is still used today by the Albany Times Union. Also in 1837 Albany Medical College is founded and 29 Elk Street is bought by the state as the first official governor's residence. Jared Rathbone is elected mayor in 1839, first Baptist mayor, last one to be chosen by the Common Council and also the first one to be elected by popular vote in 1840. In the first popular election for mayor Rathbone (Whig Party) defeats Corning by only 322 votes. 1840 census shows the breakdown of the population of Albany as 15,729 white males, 17,021 white females, 378 black males, and 499 black females. Teunis Van Vechten (Whig) defeats Gerrit Lansing by 110 votes in 1841. The first synagogue in Albany is built in 1841, for Congregation Beth Jacob, located at 8 Rose Street (later Mosher Street). Barent Staats (Democrat) defeats John Townsend (Whig) by 336 votes in 1842, the next year he doesn't run for reelection, and Friend Humphrey (Whig) defeats Peter Gansevoort by 226 votes.

Mayor Humphrey defeats the Democratic candidate George Stanton by 630 votes in 1844. The next several years see more expansion and new innovations in the city. In 1844 the New York State Normal School is established by the state, it is the predecessor of the University at Albany, SUNY, Albany Rural Cemetery is consecrated, and the Mohawk and Hudson Railroad moves its tracks to pass through Tivoli Hollow and to a new depot at the foot of Maiden Lane. 1845 sees the first telegraph office in Albany and the completion of a telegraph line to Utica and the Albany Gas Light Company starts experimenting with supplying residents with gas at home, four miles (6 km) of pipes are used. In 1846 telegraph lines are constructed to New York and Buffalo and City Hall is lit with gas. Also in 1846 the first United States naval vessel to carry the name USS Albany is launched to sea, since then 4 others have carried that name.

Mayor Humphrey loses in 1845 by 38 votes to John Paige (Democrat), a mayor of Dutch Reformed faith. The very next year Mayor Paige loses to William Parmelee by 592 votes. Also in 1846 the Roman Catholic Church creates the Diocese of Albany with John McCluskey as bishop, he later becomes the first American cardinal.

In 1847 Mayor Parmelee is reelected by the largest margin of any mayor so far, 2,920 votes more than the Democratic nominee James Goold. Also in 1847 the Rutten Kill and its associated ravine is filled in and graded for an extension of Hudson Avenue between Hawk and Lark streets and telegraphic communication with St. Louis, Missouri becomes the longest distance a telegraph can be sent from Albany. In 1848 John Taylor (Whig) defeats Thomas Hun (Democrat) by 129 votes. Also in 1848 the cornerstone of the Cathedral of the Immaculate Conception is laid at the corner of Madison Avenue and Eagle Street and the railroad to New York is completed. On August 17 "The Great Fire" burns 600 buildings over 37 acres (150,000 m^{2}) from Maiden Lane in the north to Hudson Avenue to the south. Friend Humphrey is elected mayor over Thomas Hun by 217 votes in 1849. Also in 1849 older turnpikes are planked and newer ones incorporated as plank roads, such as the Great Western Turnpike, Old Cherry Valley Turnpike, Albany and Mohawk Plank Road, and the Albany, Rensselaerville, and Schoharie Plank Road.

In 1850 Franklin Townsend (Whig) was elected over Eli Perry (Democrat) by only 12 votes. The next year Eli Perry defeats Mayor Townsend by 366 votes. Albany Law School is organized in 1851. Also in 1851 the Bleecker Reservoir (today Bleecker Stadium) is constructed and Patroon's Creek is damned creating Rensselaer Lake (Six-mile Waterworks). Mayor Perry is reelected this year by a margin of 972 votes over Thomas McMullen, the Whig candidate. Also in 1852 the constabulary police force is replaced by a professional modern police department, with four precincts, all businesses closed on the day of the funeral of Daniel Webster out of respect, and the cathedral is finally dedicated.

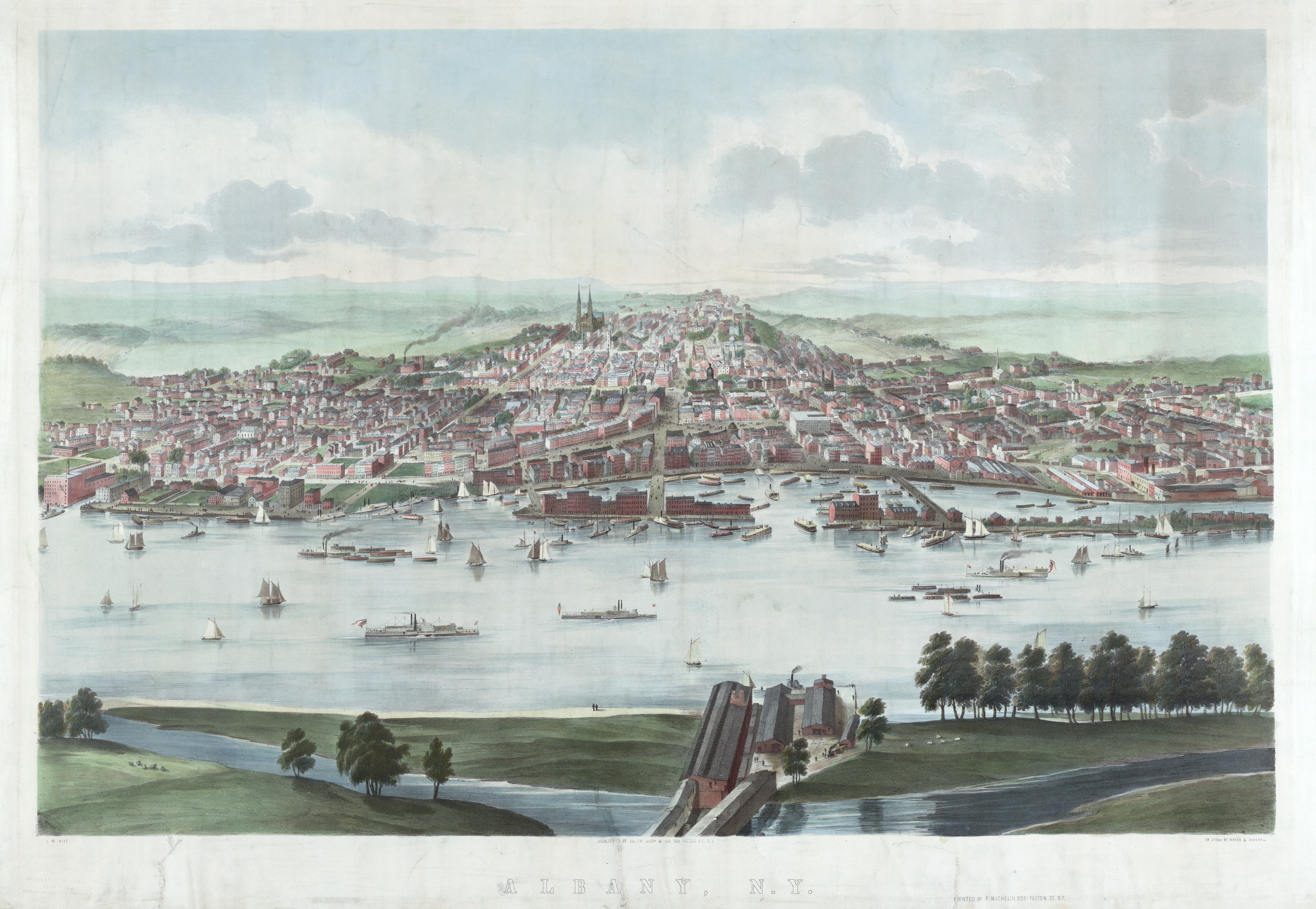
Albany as seen ca. 1853

1853 is a busy and important year in transportation for the city. The final piece of the Northern Railroad between Albany and Cohoes is finished in April and by May to Waterford. By the end of June the railroad connects to Eagle Bridge where it connects up with the railroad from there to Rutland, Vermont. The various railroads between Albany and Buffalo are consolidated in July as the New York Central by former mayor Erastus Corning. The next month the Hudson River railroad to New York is absorbed as well. The Albany and Susquehanna Railroad is begun in September and the first boat through the enlarged Erie Canal reaches Albany. In November the Northern Railroad has the first train from Vermont to arrive in Albany. In the mayoral election, William Parmelee becomes mayor again for a third time, winning by 381 votes over Mayor Eli Perry.

In 1855 the Roman Catholic See of Albany has its first diocesan synod. Mayor Parmelee dies on March 15, 1856, and Charles Godard (Republican) is appointed mayor by the Common Council to fulfill the rest of Parmelee's term, Godard is the first Republican mayor of Albany. Eli Perry (Democrat) defeats John Quackenbush by 818 votes in April. In August the American Academy for Advancement of Science meets in Albany and the State Geological Hall opens and the Dudley Observatory is dedicated. In 1857 Folsom's Business College is established by HB Bryant and HD Stratton, it is the predecessor to Bryant & Stratton. The Pioneer Rowing Club, the first rowing club in Albany, is organized in 1857 and Mayor Perry wins reelection over John Quackenbush by 101 votes.

== Bibliography ==
- Anderson, George Baker (1897). Landmarks of Rensselaer County New York. Syracuse, New York: D. Mason and Company. OCLC 1728151.
- McEneny, John (2006). Albany, Capital City on the Hudson: An Illustrated History. Sun Valley, California: American Historical Press. ISBN 1-892724-53-7.
- Rittner, Don (2002). Then & Now: Albany. Charleston, South Carolina: Arcadia Publishing. ISBN 0-7385-1142-0.
- Waite, Diana S. (1993). Albany Architecture: A Guide to the City. Albany: Mount Ida Press. ISBN 0-9625368-1-4.
