= Bloodgood (disambiguation) =

Bloodgood is an American Christian metal band.

Bloodgood may also refer to:

- Bloodgood, a 1986 album by Bloodgood.
- Bloodgood (surname)
- A. palmatum 'Bloodgood', a cultivar of Japanese Maple with dark red foliage and stems
