= Philip Hooker =

American architect

- Born: October 28, 1766; Massachusetts
- Died: January 31, 1836 (aged 69); Albany, New York, US
- Occupation: Architect
- Buildings: Hyde Hall; Albany City Hall; Albany Academy; North Dutch Reformed Church; Hamilton College Chapel; William Alexander house New York State Capitol

Philip Hooker (October 28, 1766 – January 31, 1836) was an American architect from Albany, New York, known for Hyde Hall, the facade of the Hamilton College Chapel, The Albany Academy, Albany City Hall, and the original New York State Capitol building.

== Early life ==
Hooker was born on October 28, 1766, to Samuel Hooker (1745–1832) and Rachel Hinds, the eldest of at least six children. His father is said to have brought his family to live in Albany in 1772 from Massachusetts.

== Career ==
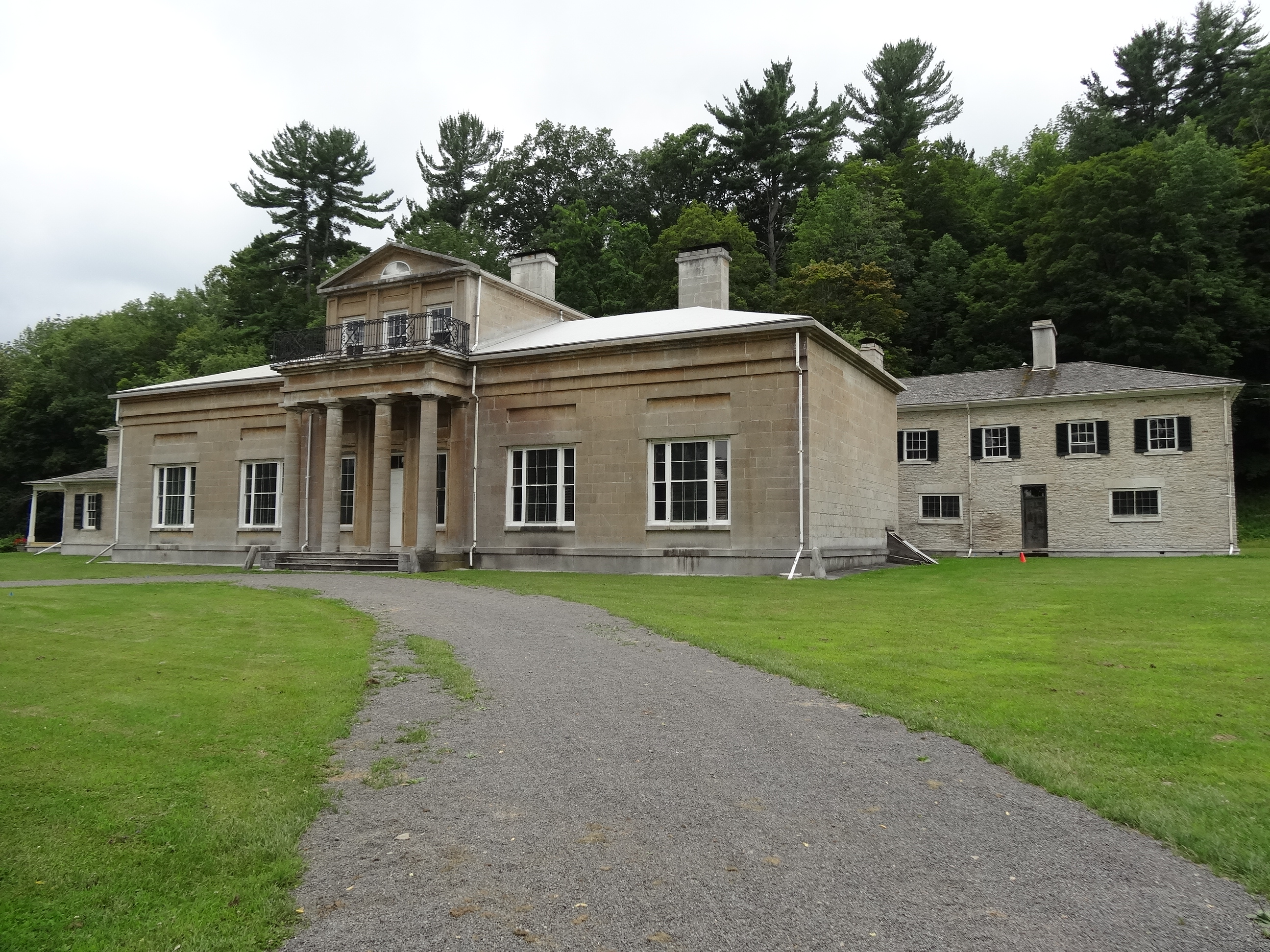
Hyde Hall

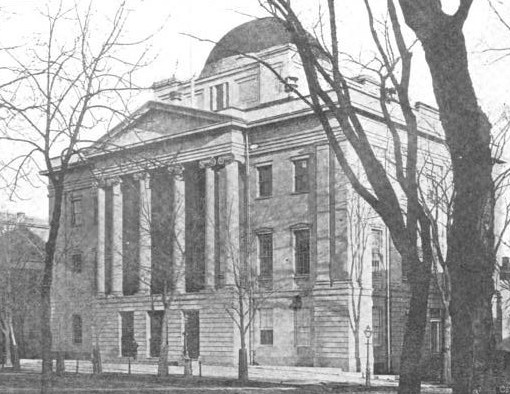
Albany City Hall

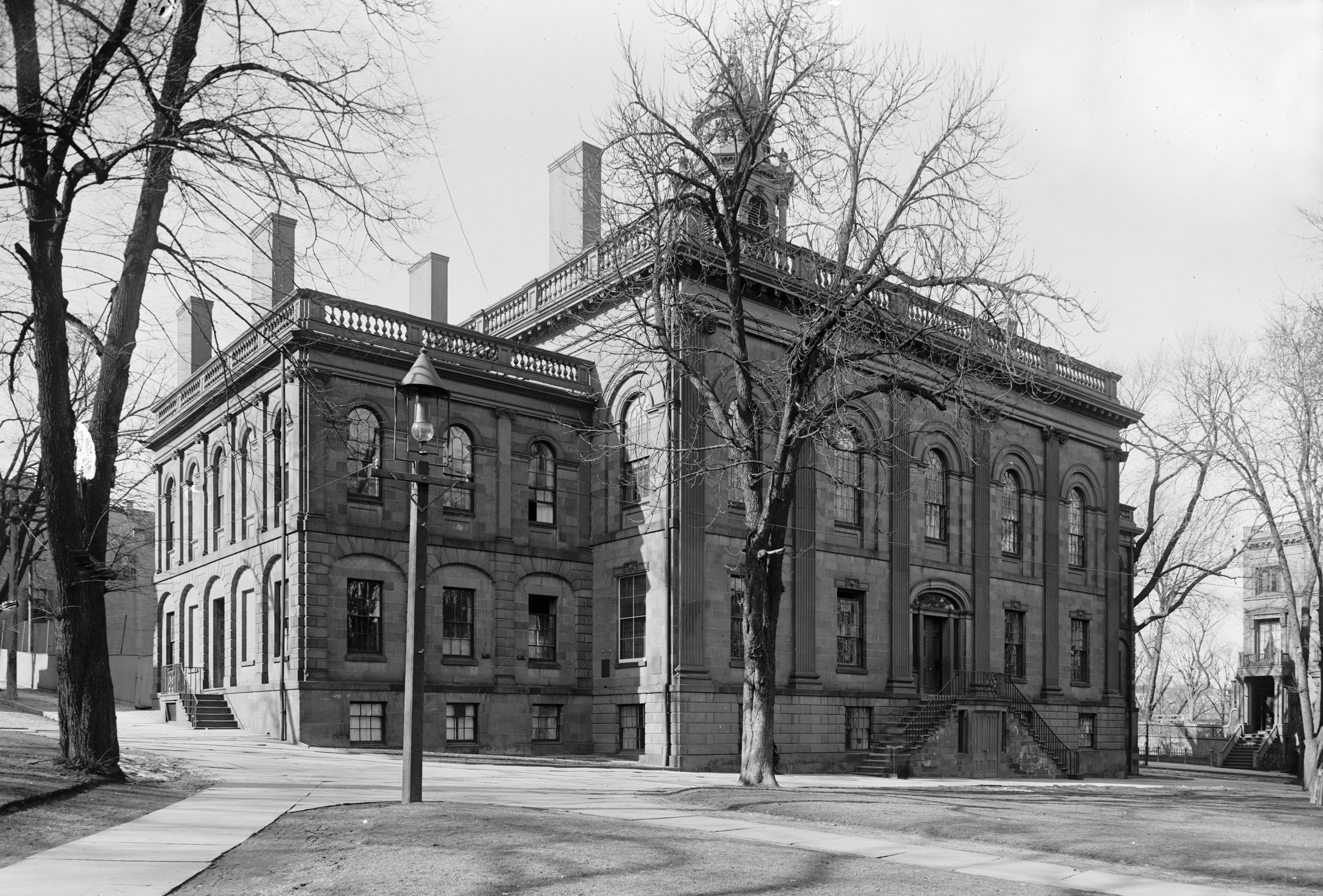
Albany Academy

In the New York City directories of 1792 and 1793, he was listed as a "house carpenter" where he likely learned architecture from European architects and engineers who were working in the City. Hooker assembled a library during this period and when his parents and the rest of his family moved to Utica in 1797, he stayed behind in Albany.

He became a prominent member of Albany serving as alderman assessor, city architect, city superintendent, and city surveyor. During his career, he designed Hyde Hall, the facade of the Hamilton College Chapel, The Albany Academy, Albany City Hall, and the original New York State Capitol building. He is believed to have designed the Gen. John G. Weaver House at Utica, New York. It was listed on the National Register of Historic Places in 1989.

=== Notable buildings ===
An existing National Register of Historic Places building that he designed, with John H. Lothrop, is:

- Hamilton College Chapel on the Hamilton College campus.

Two other National Register of Historic Places that are also National Historic Landmarks which he designed are:

- Hyde Hall, at Otsego Lake
- Roscoe Conkling House, in Utica, New York

Others:

- New York State Arsenal (1799; razed)
- St. Peter's Episcopal Church (1802; razed 1859)
- New York State Bank (1803; portions of front elevation survive)
- Bank of Albany (1809; rzed)
- Mechanics and Farmers Bank (1811; portions reused in receiving vault, Glenmont)
- Aiken House, Rensselaer, New York (1816)
- St. Mary's Roman Catholic Church (1829; razed)
- Albany City Hall (1832, destroyed by fire in 1880)

=== Private residences ===
He also designed many private residences for wealthy Albanians including the Van Rensselaers, Cornings, Pruyns, Lansings, William James and others. One mansion attributed to him and built for Samuel Hill, is now the Fort Orange Club at 110 Washington Avenue.

He was also a politician and a member of the "Albany Regency."

=== Monographs ===
Two monographs have been written on Hooker's work:

- Edward W. Root. Philip Hooker: A Contribution to the Study of the Renaissance in America (New York: Charles Scribner's Sons), 1929.
- Douglas G. Bucher and Walter Richard Wheeler. A Neat Plain Modern Stile: Philip Hooker and His Contemporaries, 1796-1836 (Amherst, Mass.: University of Massachusetts Press), 1993.

== Personal life ==
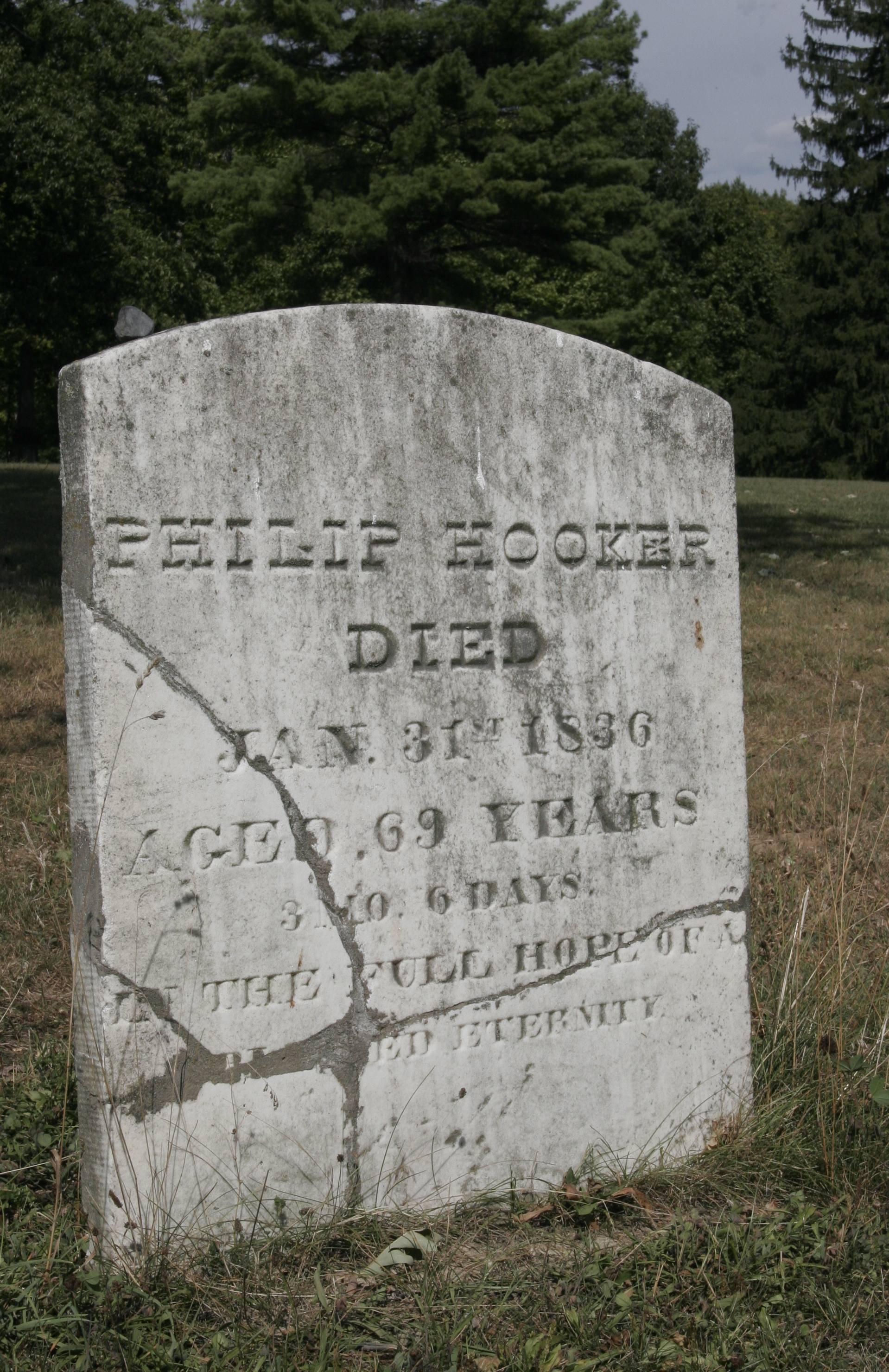
Philip Hooker Grave Site, "Died Jan. 31st, 1836, Aged 69 Yrs. 3 Mons. 6 Days, In Full Hope of A Blessed Eternity"

His first wife, Mary, died in 1812 at the age of 39. In 1814, he married Sarah Monk (c. 1780/90–1858) at the Albany Lutheran church. Sara was the daughter of Christopher Monk.

Neither of his marriages produced children, therefore his estate was left to his widow upon his death on January 31, 1836. His will indicated that "Sarah, who has by her industry and frugality assisted me in an essential manner to acquire what I possess, the whole of my estate of every kind and description whatsoever and wheresoever the same may be, which I may own, be in possession of or be entitled to at the time of my decease; to be and remain her sole property so long as she remains a widow..."

He was originally buried in the State Street Burial Grounds in Albany; his body was reinterred in the 1860s at the Albany Rural Cemetery, in lot 12, section 49, in Menands, New York.
