= Charles Freeman Geschickter =

American physician

- Born: 8 January 1901; Washington, D.C.
- Died: 1987 (aged 85–86)
- Occupation: Pathologist
- Known for: Diseases of the breast: diagnosis, pathology, treatment

Charles Freeman Geschickter (8 January 1901 – 1987) was an American pathologist who made important contributions to the understanding of breast cancer and other diseases of the breast. In his later years, of which little is recorded, he apparently undertook work for the Central Intelligence Agency (CIA).

== Birth and education ==
Charles Freeman Geschickter was born on 8 January 1901 in Washington, D.C. His father was an inventor and was involved in the fur trade and in cabinet-making. Geschickter took an undergraduate degree in engineering, then studied Educational Psychology, earning MA and MS degrees. He was awarded a scholarship to Columbia University to continue his studies in psychology, but became interested in zoology. The Professor of Zoology at George Washington University arranged for him to be admitted to medical studies at Johns Hopkins University in Baltimore, where the prominent surgeon Joseph Colt Bloodgood became his mentor.

== Career ==
Bloodgood invited Geschickter to work on multiple myeloma, and Geschickter invited his classmate Murray Copeland to work with him. In 1928 Geschickter and Copeland published a survey of 425 recorded cases of this disease, some dating as far back as 1848. They identified a number of common features, but not blood protein abnormalities or elevation of the rate of erythrocyte sedimentation. After their internship, Bloodgood invited both men to study bone tumors in his surgical pathology laboratory. In 1929 they were both given surgical fellowships at the Mayo Clinic. A few months later, Bloodgood asked Geschickter to come back and help him at the new Garvan Cancer Research Laboratory. Geschickter agreed, and before starting work made a tour of pathology laboratories in Europe, including the biochemistry unit run by Otto Heinrich Warburg in Berlin. His main interest after this was in cancer research and pathology.

In 1931 Geschickter and Copeland, then at the Memorial Hospital for the Treatment of Cancer and Allied Diseases, published a large monograph on bone tumors. They had done some of the work while they were Mayo fellows. The work, sponsored by the American Cancer Society, was dedicated to Bloodgood, and made use of material that he had collected at Johns Hopkins Hospital. In 1935 Geschickter took full responsibility for the Garvan Cancer Research Laboratory after Bloodgood's death. He was also appointed pathologist to St. Agnes Hospital in Baltimore. He continued to undertake some clinical work, but his main energy was devoted to studying the relationship of hormones to breast disease, including hormone therapy. This led to his major 800-page work, first published in 1943, Diseases of the breast: diagnosis, pathology, treatment. The book is evenly divided between benign and cancerous conditions, and gives a far more complete coverage of the subject than anything that had been published before.

During World War II Geschickter was Head of Pathology at Bethesda Naval Hospital. In 1946 he was made Professor of Pathology at Georgetown University, and was also Director of the Clinical Research Unit. He was an engaging and popular teacher. In 1947 he was the first to use the chemical EDTA (Ethylenediaminetetraacetic acid) as a treatment. In an early version of chemotherapy, he successfully used the chemical to remove nickel that had accumulated in toxic levels in a patient's body. In December 1966 Life magazine published a story on a plan for a radically modern new hospital, for which the U.S. Congress had authorized a grant of $7 million and the hospital was to raise $8 million. Geshickter and two other doctors had worked out the design with the goal of saving money, using space more efficiently and, most important, saving lives. The existing facility would be used for patients who did not require intensive care, while the modern new facility with 21 operating rooms and 192 beds would be designed specifically for the acutely ill.

A 1970s Senate investigation of CIA activities found that the CIA had provided funds to Geschickter's private research foundation, which were in turn used for a research building at the Georgetown Medical Center. It appears that the funds were used for human and animal experiments related to defenses against interrogation and brainwashing, although Georgetown University denied any knowledge of such experiments. In 1977 Geschickter testified before the Senate committee that over a period of thirteen years up to 1967 his foundation had funded over $1 million of research at Georgetown and $2 million of research at other universities. The Georgetown research related to drugs that produced amnesia. The Gorman Annex was funded by money provided to his foundation by the CIA. Since this appeared to be private money, the Federal government provided matching funding.

Geschickter died in 1987. The "Geschickter tumor", a bone tumor found on the femur or humerus that is often malignant, is named after him.

== Bibliography ==
A partial list of publications:

- Geschickter, Charles Freeman; Bloodgood, Joseph Colt; Copeland, Murray Marcus; Lewis, Dean (1936). Tumors of Bone Including the Jaws and Joints. American Journal of cancer.
- Geschickter, Charles Freeman; Copeland, Murray Marcus (1945). Diseases of the breast: diagnosis, pathology, treatment. J. B. Lippincott.
- White, Benjamin Vroom; Geschickter, Charles Freeman (1947). Diagnosis in daily practice: an office routine based on the incidence of various diseases. Lippincott.
- Geschickter, Charles Freeman; Copeland, Murray Marcus (1949). Tumors of bone. J.B. Lippincott Co.
- Geschickter, Charles F.; Cannon, Albert (1963). Central Nervous System: Illustrated with 293 Plates. Lippincott.
- Geschickter, Charles Freeman; Naval Medical School (U.S.) (1963). Color atlas of pathology: Central nervous system. Lippincott.
- Copeland, Murray Marcus; Geschickter, Charles Freeman (1963). Malignant Bone Tumors: Primary and Metastatic. American Cancer Society.
- Geschickter, Charles Freeman; Antonovych, Tatiana T. (1971). The kidney in health and disease. Lippincott. ISBN 9780397502820.
- Geschickter, Charles Freeman (March 1973). The lung in health and disease. Lippincott. ISBN 978-0-397-50311-7.
