= Wheeler Peckham Bloodgood =

American lawyer

- Born: November 4, 1871; Milwaukee, Wisconsin
- Died: December 17, 1930 (aged 59)
- Occupation: Lawyer

Wheeler Peckham Bloodgood (November 4, 1871 – December 17, 1930) was a prominent American lawyer who was active in reforming antitrust legislation.

== Origins ==
Wheeler Peckham Bloodgood was born in Milwaukee, Wisconsin on November 4, 1871, son of Francis Bloodgood and Josephine M. Colt. He was a descendant of Francois Bloetgoet, a Dutch emigrant who had moved to Flushing, Long Island in 1658. His father and uncles were also successful lawyers in Wisconsin. His oldest brother Francis Bloodgood Jr. also became a noted attorney in Milwaukee. His brother Joseph Colt Bloodgood (November 1, 1867 – October 22, 1935) was to become an eminent surgeon.

== Career ==
Bloodgood's father had established a law firm with Wheeler Hazard Peckham in 1854, and he studied law in this office. He was admitted to the bar in 1894. He married Elizabeth Twombly Farrand on September 14, 1896.

In the 1912 national elections Bloodgood was the Wisconsin committee member for Theodore Roosevelt's Progressive Party. After the start of World War I Bloodgood became chairman of the Milwaukee Defense Council. He was one of the founders of the Wisconsin Loyalty League in the summer of 1917. The main purpose was to sell Liberty bonds and organize lectures about the war, but the league may have been involved in intimidation of people opposed to the war. In 1918 he founded the "Next of Kin" organization for people whose relatives were serving in the military. As leader of this organization, he demanded that the socialist mayor of Milwaukee, Daniel Hoan, should be indicted by the state for disloyalty. His organization called for the state to declare martial law, suppress dissent and punish or banish seditious people. In 1918 he advocated dropping the teaching of foreign languages in the Milwaukee schools.

Bloodgood was strongly opposed to integrating women, who he felt were instinctively pacifist, into the War Department. He wrote "It has been my experience that almost invariably serious and difficult complications arise the moment women are given equal powers with men in connection with the direction of organization work that relates to the Citizen's Army," He said "The men of this country ... do not expect the women to take part in wars on the firing line... Until women are subject to military service on the same basis as men, they cannot expect and should not be given equal authority, either in organizations for preparedness, or in fighting units."

Bloodgood was a proponent of liberalization of antitrust legislation to protect workers and avoid chaotic competition, and in 1928 was made Chairman of the National Civic Federation (NCF) committee on antitrust. In New York in December 1929 he forcibly presented arguments for fundamentally changing the Sherman Antitrust Act. The time seemed ripe, with the Justice Department taking a stronger position on anti-trust violations and the economy in decline.

Bloodgood died of pneumonia on December 17, 1930.

== Bibliography ==
- Remey, Oliver E.; Cochems, Henry F.; Bloodgood, Wheeler P. (1912). The Attempted Assassination of Ex-President Theodore Roosevet. Kessinger Publishing. ISBN 978-1-163-97160-4.
