= Gen. John G. Weaver House =

Historic house in New York, United States

- U.S. National Register of Historic Places
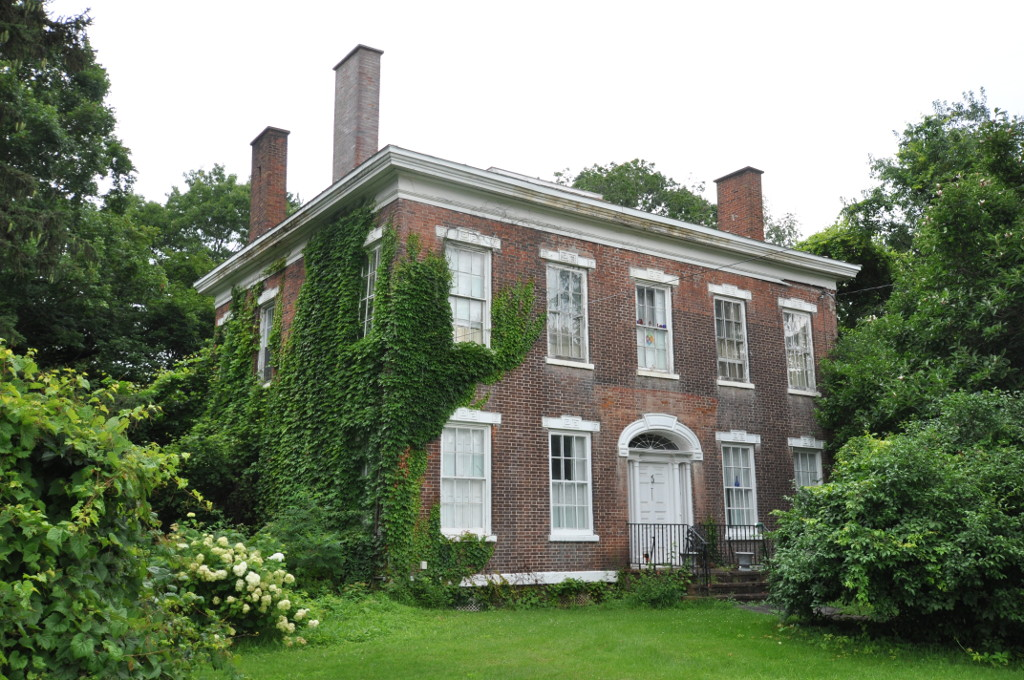

- Location within New York Location within the United States
- Location: 711 Herkimer Rd., Utica, New York
- Coordinates: 43°6′47″N 75°11′50″W
- Area: 1 acre (0.40 ha)
- Built: 1815
- Architect: Hooker, Philip
- Architectural style: Federal
- NRHP reference No.: 89002093
- Added to NRHP: December 7, 1989

Gen. John G. Weaver House is a historic home located at Utica in Oneida County, New York. It was built about 1815 and is a massive 2-story, brick, hip roofed double pile building in the Federal style. It is composed of a 2-story, five-by-four-bay rectangular main block, with a 2-story, gable-roofed rear wing. It is believed that the home was designed by Philip Hooker or someone strongly influenced by his work.

It was listed on the National Register of Historic Places in 1989.
