= Aiken House (Rensselaer, New York) =

Historic house in New York, United States

- U.S. National Register of Historic Places
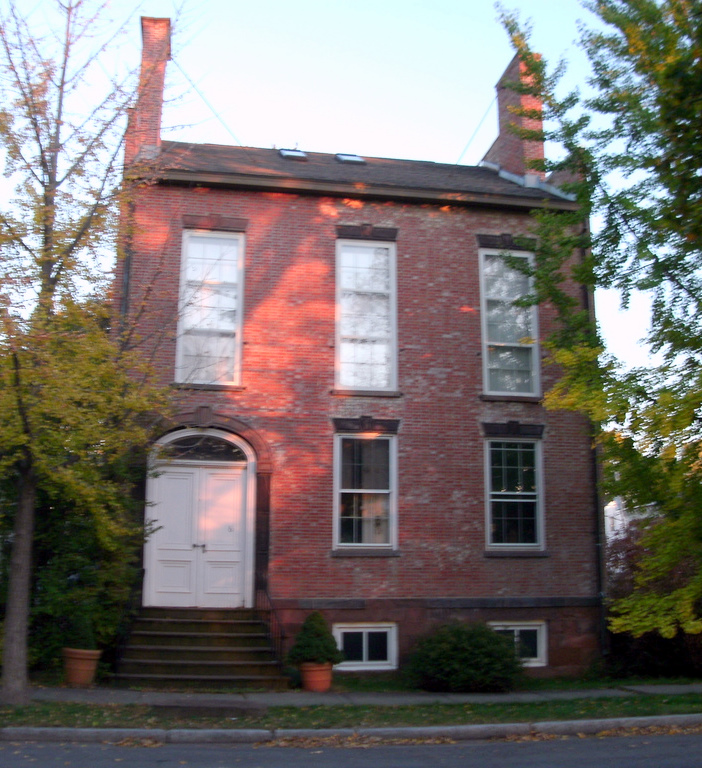
- Aiken House, October 2010

- Location within New York Location within the United States
- Location: NE corner of Riverside and Aiken Aves., Rensselaer, New York
- Coordinates: 42°38′8″N 73°44′58″W
- Area: less than one acre
- Built: 1816
- Architect: Hooker, Philip
- Architectural style: Federal
- NRHP reference No.: 74001296
- Added to NRHP: December 31, 1974

Aiken House is a historic home located in Rensselaer in Rensselaer County, New York. It was built about 1816 and is a 2 1/2-story, rectangular, brick townhouse dated to the Federal period. It has a 2 1/2-story rear wing. It features stepped gable sides. It was built by the founder of the City of Rensselaer, William Akin, and designed by noted Albany architect Philip Hooker (1766–1836).

It was listed on the National Register of Historic Places in 1974.
