= Townsend Park =

Urban park in Albany, New York

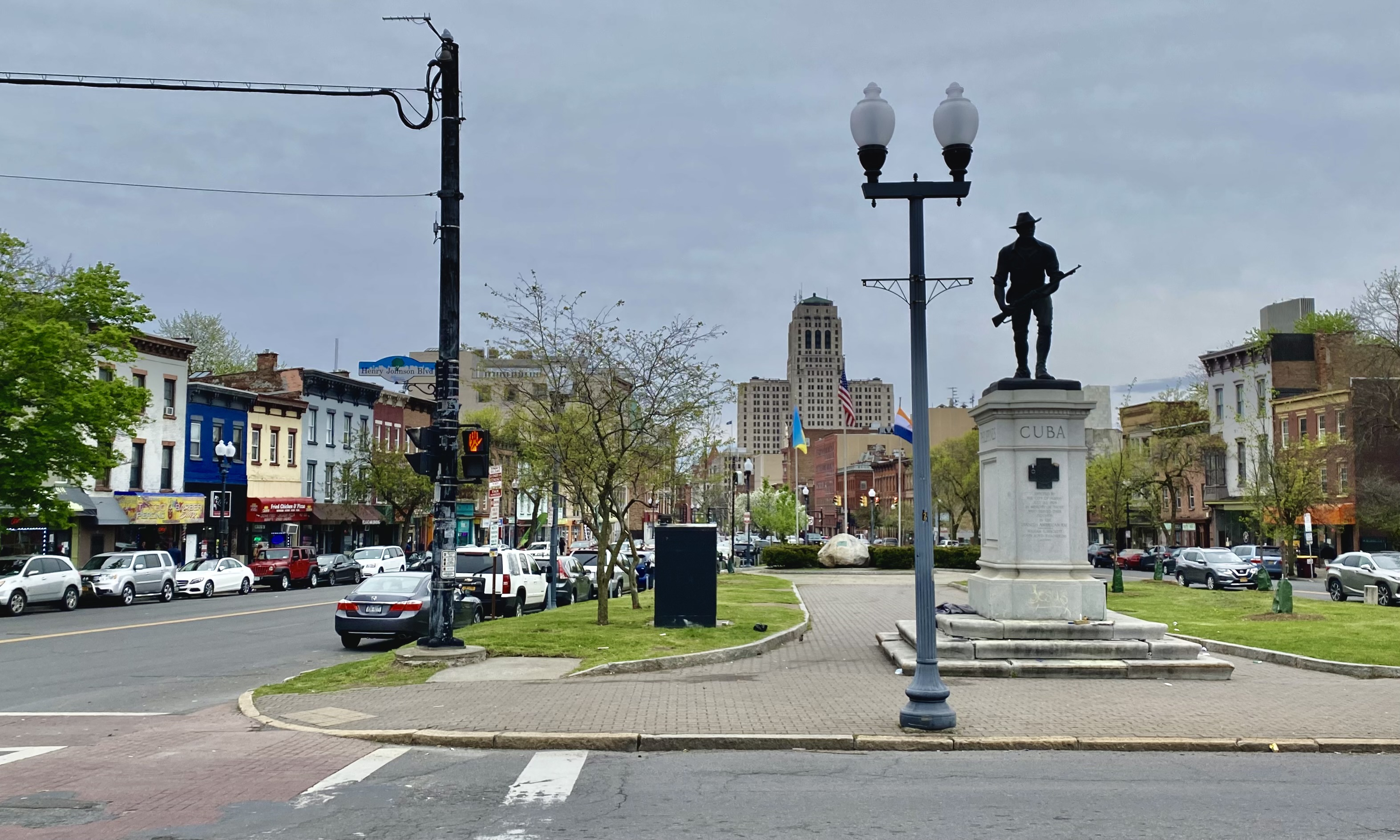
- As seen from Henry Johnson Boulevard in May 2022, with the Spanish-American War Monument at right
- Interactive map of Townsend Park
- Type: Urban park
- Location: Albany, New York
- Coordinates: 42°39′27.97″N 73°45′53.28″W
- Area: 20,700 square feet (0.192 ha)
- Created: 1833
- Operator: City of Albany

Townsend Park is a small urban park in Albany, New York, New York State, United States. It encompasses a triangle of land formed by the Y-intersection of Central and Washington avenues (north and south borders respectively), with the third (western) border formed by Henry Johnson Boulevard.

== History ==
A fence enclosure was put around the park in 1833, by nearby residents and the park was christened Washington Park after George Washington with the intentions of erecting a statue in his honor, but the city later changed the name in honor of former Mayor John Townsend, Washington going to nearby former State Street Parade Grounds as Washington Park.

In 1928 a Spanish–American War monument was erected in the western end of the park.

In 2009 as part of an effort to spruce up the park the Central Avenue Business Improvement District (BID) removed the park benches and picnic tables and replaced them with metal mesh topped poles. Some of those who work in the area protested the removal of the benches by the organization as an attempt to limit public accessibility, particular the comfort and availability to use the new seating by the disabled. Since the benches have been removed, crime rates within the park have significantly decreased and vacancies have decreased. According to Albany Police Department's Crime Analysis Center’s statistics, in the last five years crime has decreased from 113 total crimes in 2009 to 73 in 2013 (13 percent total.) In addition, the neighborhood has become a center for ethnic restaurants, featuring Caribbean, African, Middle Eastern and several Indian restaurants.

== Spanish–American War Monument ==
The Spanish–American War Monument is a 20-foot (6.1 m) tall monument of a bronze statue of a US soldier marching into battle, rifle leading the way. It was sculpted by Dave Lithgow and erected in 1928. The statue commemorates the four companies of the First Provisional Regiment of the 10th Battalion which was located at the nearby Washington Avenue Armory. During the war they were sent to Hawaii due to concerns of an eminent Spanish attack, which never occurred.

Inscribed around the base are several inscriptions, a different location in the war is inscribed on each of the four sides. Hawaii on the east (back) side, Porto Rico {sic} on the south side, Philippines on the north side, and Cuba on the west (front) side. A bronze cross on the front is inscribed with "United Spanish War Veterans 1898-1902" and below that the inscription "Erected by the City of Albany July 22, 1928 in Memory of Those Who Served Their Country in the Spanish American War–William S. Hackett John Boyd Thacher 2nd Mayors."

== Activities ==
Though a small park (roughly .48 acres (0.19 ha)) Townsend Park still manages to be used for activities by the neighborhood and city-at-large. Chess became a favorite activity after the nearby Albany Public Library main branch banned the activity. Since 2014, the park is also regularly used by Food Not Bombs in Albany during the warmer seasons for free vegan community meals.
