= Hamilton College Chapel =

- U.S. National Register of Historic Places
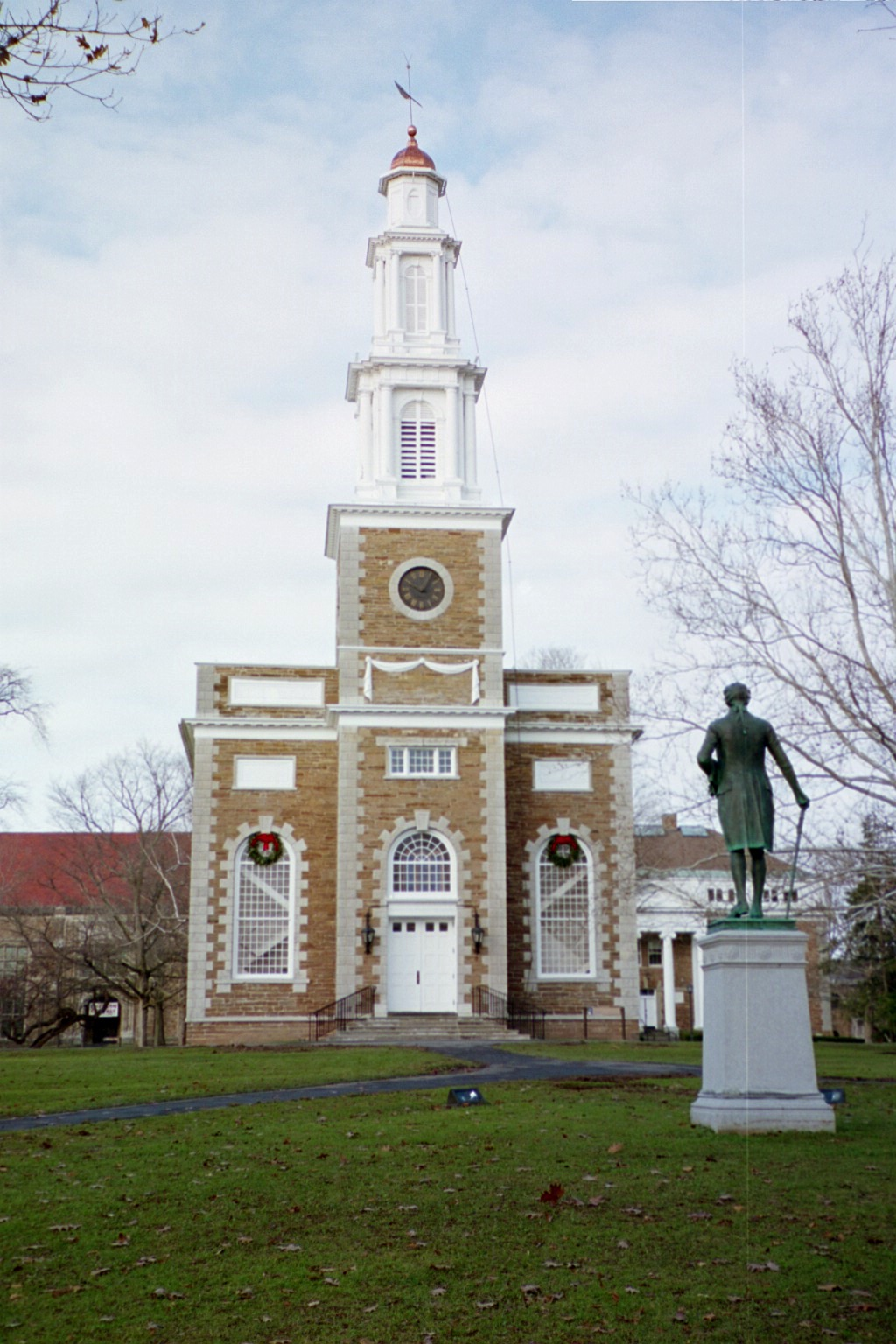

- Location within New York Location within the United States
- Location: Clinton, New York
- Coordinates: 43°3′6.74″N 75°24′21.8″W
- Built: 1825
- Architect: Philip Hooker; John H. Lothrop
- Architectural style: Federal
- NRHP reference No.: 72000892
- Added to NRHP: November 3, 1972

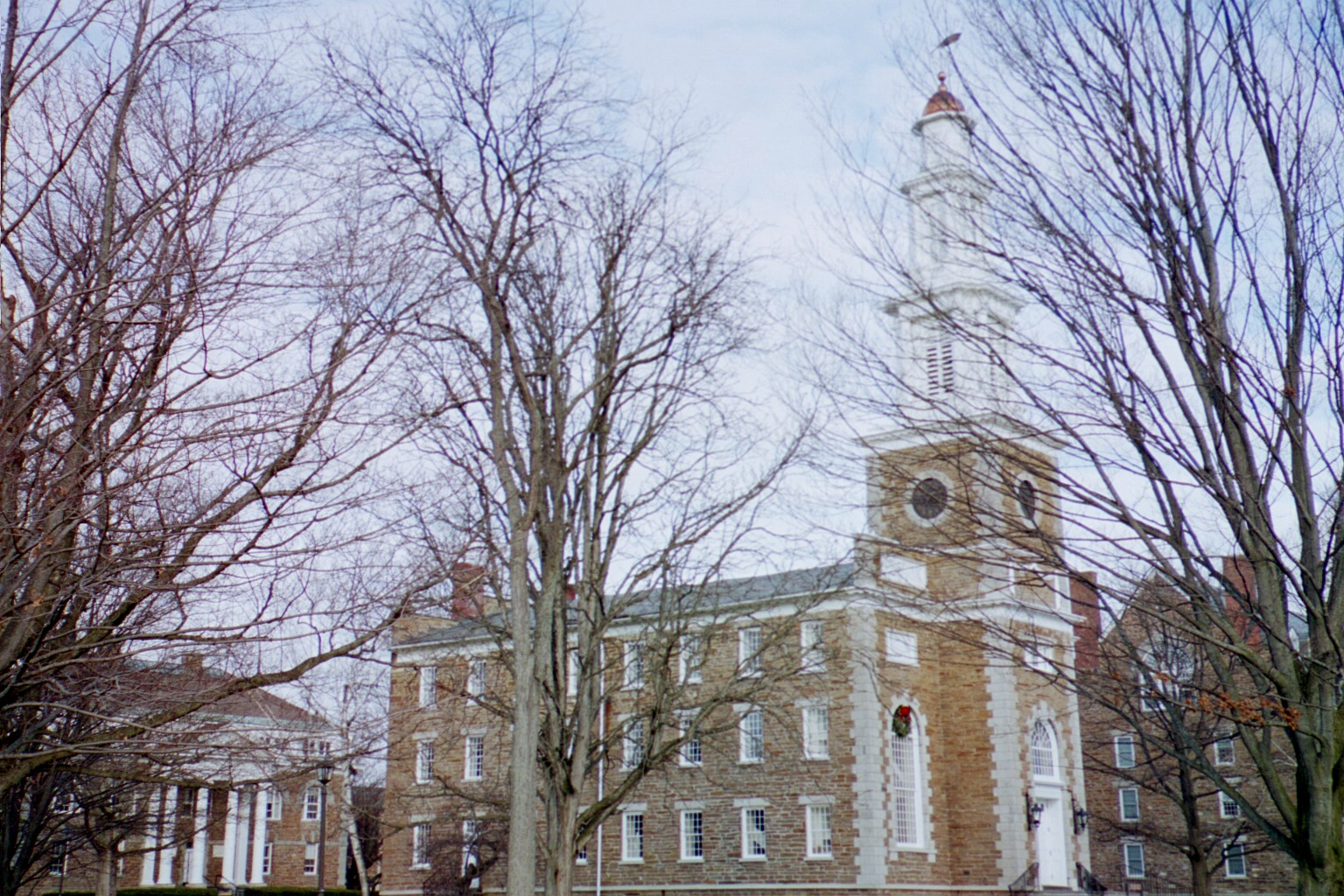
Southern Side of the Hamilton College Chapel

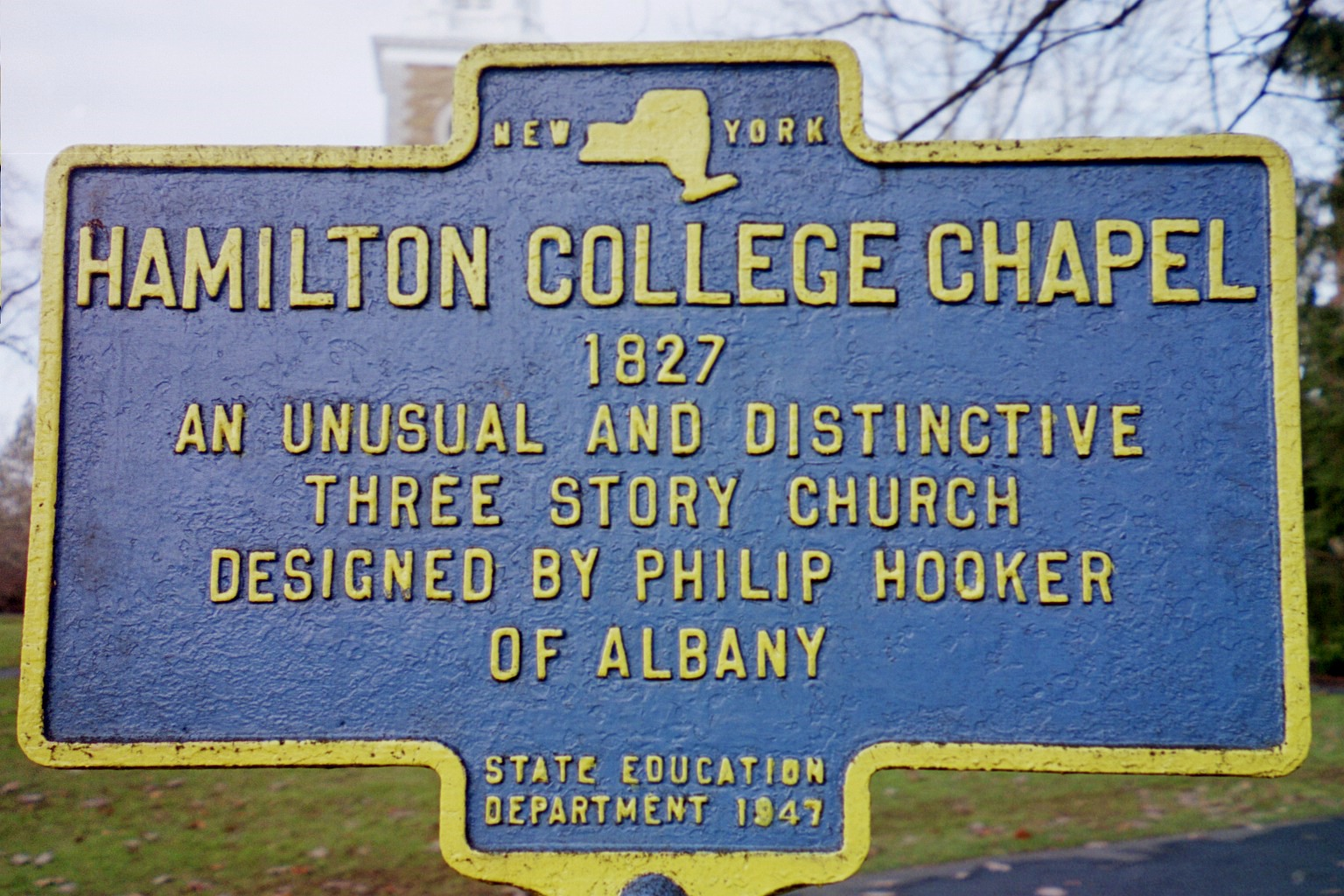
Historic Marker for the Hamilton College Chapel

The Hamilton College Chapel, on the campus of Hamilton College in Clinton, NY, was completed in 1827.

== Architecture ==
The façade was designed by architect Philip Hooker, notable for his many designs of public buildings in Albany, NY, as well as for designing Hyde Hall in Springfield Center, NY. The conservative Federal style of the chapel is characteristic of Hooker's work. The distinctive three story main body and interior design are credited to John H. Lothrop, a Hamilton College trustee. The design includes three bays on the eastern façade and eight bays of double hung windows along the north and south faces of the building. The mellow orange of the stone body of the chapel is Oriskany stone, while the corner quoins are of Trenton limestone. The Oriskany stone was quarried and laid by Reuben Wilcox of Whitestown, NY. The interior carpentry was done by Deacon Isaac Williams, of Clinton, NY. The tower of the eastern façade of the building is topped by a white, octagonal cupola. The quill weathervane atop the cupola is representative of Hamilton College's commitment to teaching students to write effectively.

== Uses ==
The chapel was originally designed as classrooms and offices, as well as the chapel proper. Spaces in the building have been used for many purposes. Until 1872 the college library was housed in increasing portions of the top floor the chapel. From 1830-1855 the chemistry lab was lodged in the cellar. Commencement exercises were held in the chapel from 1898-1946. Currently, as well as for religious services, the chapel is used for public lectures, concerts and assemblies.

== Alterations ==
Many changes have been made to the building. In 1877 the three faced clock still in evidence today was donated by John Wanamaker, of Philadelphia. In 1893, the steeple was restored. The current bell was installed in 1902, and electrified in 1950. Electricity was installed in the building in 1907, and fire fighting equipment in 1916. In 1949, the interior was remodeled. More recently, in 1999 the third floor office and meeting space was renovated. A tracker organ was installed.
