= Francis Bloodgood =

American lawyer

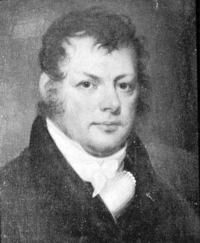
- Francis Bloodgood around 1810, attributed to Ezra Ames

Mayor of Albany, New York
- In office 1831–1831
- Preceded by: John Townsend
- Succeeded by: John Townsend

Mayor of Albany, New York
- In office 1833–1833
- Preceded by: John Townsend
- Succeeded by: Erastus Corning

Personal details
- Born: June 12, 1775 Albany, Province of New York
- Died: March 5, 1840 (aged 64)
- Occupation: Lawyer
- Known for: Mayor of Albany

Francis Bloodgood (June 12, 1775 (Note: The Bi-centennial History of Albany (1886) gives his birthdate as 12 June 1775. The 1852 Annals of Albany says his gravestone gave an age of 71, implying birth around 1769.) - March 5, 1840) was an American lawyer who was mayor of Albany, New York, in 1831 and 1833.

== Early years ==
Francis Bloodgood was born on June 12, 1775, in Albany, the son of James and Lydia Van Valkenburgh Bloodgood. His great-grandfather was Francis Bloetgoet of Flushing, Long Island. His father was a merchant who was involved in the West Indian trade. He studied law at Yale University. His uncle was Elisha Jenkins, who was three times Secretary of State of New York, and was mayor of Albany from 1816 to 1819.

Bloodgood established a law firm in Albany in the State Hall on State Street. He became Director and President of the State Bank and President of the Albany Insurance Company. He was a trustee of the Albany Presbyterian Church. Bloodgood married Elizabeth Cobham in 1792. In 1800 his household had seven family members and four slaves. From 1797 to 1825 he was clerk of the New York Supreme Court.

== Politics ==
Bloodgood was involved in a street brawl in April 1807 over a political dispute. After Elisha Jenkins had passed a resolution questioning Solomon Van Rensselaer's honesty, the two men came to blows. Witnesses said that Bloodgood then struck Van Rensselaer on the head with a large cane. He later paid damages to Solomon Van Rensselaer for injuries received in the brawl.

Bloodgood's first wife died on November 13, 1818, aged fifty, and was buried in the Presbyterian burial ground. He may have then married Caroline Whistler. In December 1830 he was elected mayor of Albany. Francis Bloodgood entered office in 1831 and paid all the debts of those in debtors' prison on the occasion of his swearing in. A City Hall was erected on Eagle Street, between Maiden Lane and Pine Street, the location of the current City Hall, made of marble and capped by a gilded dome. John Townsend returned as mayor in 1832. In 1833 Francis Bloodgood became mayor for the second time.

== Death ==
Francis Bloodgood died on March 5, 1840, aged 71. He was also buried in the Presbyterian burial ground. At the time of his death he was married to Anna Shoemaker (born March 27, 1777), from a Philadelphia Quaker family, the widow of Robert Morris Jr. His wife lived on until March 5, 1865, when she died in Philadelphia. His son was Major William Bloodgood [1801-1874], father of Captain Edward Bloodgood (38th US Infantry), who reportedly died at Fort Larned, Kansas on July 31, 1867. In fact this report was in error-Edward Bloodgood was a Brevet Lt Col/Captain 38th US Infantry Regiment In command of Fort Seldon, New Mexico in 1868 and died in 1914.

== Notes and references ==
Notes

Citations

Sources

- Bielinski, Stefan (2003). "Francis Bloodgood".
- Howell, George Rogers; Tenney, Jonathan (1886). Bi-centennial History of Albany: History of the County of Albany, N.Y., from 1609 to 1886. W. W. Munsell & Company.
- Jordan, John W. (2004-05-30). Colonial And Revolutionary Families Of Pennsylvania. Genealogical Publishing Com. ISBN 978-0-8063-5239-8.
- Munsell, Joel (1852). The Annals of Albany. J. Munsell.
- Reynolds, Cuyler (1906). Albany Chronicles. J. B. Lyon Company, printers. p. 497.
- Van Rensselaer, Solomon Van Vechten; Jenkins, Elisha (1808). Assault and battery: report of the trials of the causes of Elisha Jenkins vs. Solomon Van Rensselaer, Solomon Van Rensselaer v. John Tayler, the same vs. Charles D. Cooper, and the same vs. Francis Bloodgood : before arbitrators, at Albany, August 16th, 17th and 18th, 1808. Croswell & Frary.
