= John Townsend (mayor) =

American politician (1783–1854)

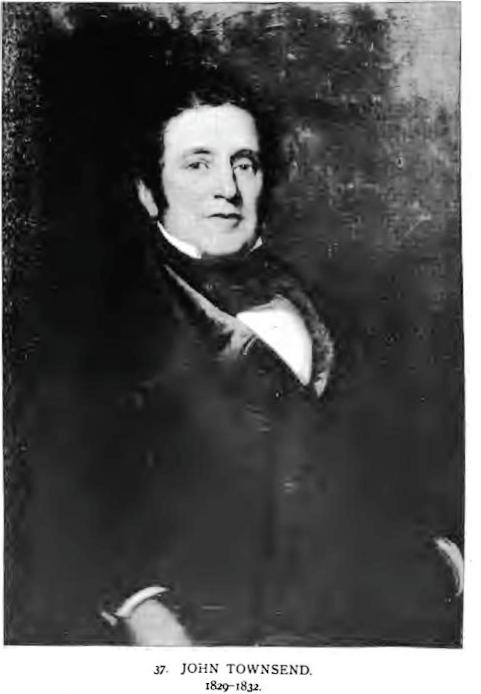
- John Townsend

37th Mayor of Albany, New York
- In office February 9, 1829 – December 31, 1829

Mayor of Albany, New York
- In office January 1, 1830 – December 31, 1830
- Preceded by: Charles E. Dudley
- Succeeded by: Francis Bloodgood

Mayor of Albany, New York
- In office January 1, 1832 – December 31, 1832
- Preceded by: Francis Bloodgood
- Succeeded by: Francis Bloodgood

Personal details
- Born: June 14, 1783 Sterling, New York
- Died: August 26, 1854 (aged 71) Albany, New York
- Resting place: Albany Rural Cemetery
- Party: Whig
- Spouse: Abby Spencer
- Children: 12
- Parent(s): Henry Townsend; Mary Bennett
- Occupation: Iron worker, industrialist, politician

John Townsend (1783–1854) was a prominent industrialist and politician in the Albany, New York, area. He was unanimously elected Mayor of Albany three times and served as the 37th mayor of the city.

== Early life and family ==
John Townsend was born at the Sterling Iron Works in Orange County on June 14, 1783, the son of Henry Townsend and Mary (Bennett) Townsend. He was descended from Henry Townsend, one of the founders of Oyster Bay, New York, in the mid-17th century.

== Career ==
=== Iron Business ===
Townsend moved to Albany, New York, in 1802 to work for his brother Isaiah who ran a successful iron and foundry business in the city called "I & J Townsend" The firm was involved in the buying and selling of iron and produced in their foundry machine castings and railcar wheels. Townsend took over the business when his brother died in 1838. Townsend's nephew Franklin Townsend joined the business as a young man in 1849. Upon the John Townsend's death Franklin took over and continued the business.

The business, which was eventually known as the "Townsend Furnace", was located at Broadway, Rensselaer and Mulberry streets fronting upon the Hudson River for 180 feet, and the brick building was four stories high.

=== Political career ===
Townsend was a member of the Whig Party.

Townsend was mayor of the city of Albany in 1829, 1830, and 1832. He was elected to his first term by unanimous vote of the city council on February 9, 1829, upon the resignation of Mayor Charles E. Dudley, who took office as US Senator for New York. He was reelected to a second term on December 21, 1829, by unanimous vote of the council and began his term on January 1, 1830.

Townsend lost the council election on December 29, 1830, by a vote of 9 to 12 to Francis Bloodgood, who then went on to serve as 38th mayor of the city. He was, however, reelected to the office at the council vote on December 29, 1831, and regained the office on January 1, 1832.

In 1832 an outbreak of cholera occurred in Albany and Townsend was praised for his efforts in combating the disease.

On November 20, 1833, the council voted to name a park at the intersection of Washington Avenue and the Bowery (Central Ave) "Townsend Park" in honor of the then former mayor.

=== Commercial interests ===
At the time of his death, Townsend was president of the Commercial Bank of Albany and acting president of the Albany Insurance Company. He was on the board of:

- Water Commissioners
- Albany Exchange Company
- Albany Savings Bank
- Albany Pier Company
- Syracuse Coarse Salt Company
- Watervliet Turnpike Company

== Personal life ==
Townsend married on July 7, 1810, Abby Spencer, daughter of Ambrose Spencer (1765–1848) and Laura (Canfield) Spencer. Ambrose held a number of important government positions in the city of Albany and in New York State, including 35th Mayor of Albany (from 1824 to 1826), New York State Attorney General (from 1802 to 1804), and Chief Justice of the New York State Supreme Court (from 1819 to 1823). Laura Spencer's brother, John Canfield Spencer (1788–1855), served as Secretary of War under President John Tyler. The Townsends resided at 142 State Street, Albany, New York, and had twelve children:

1. Theodore Townsend
2. Catherine Clinton Townsend
3. Edward Townsend
4. John Townsend
5. Mary Townsend
6. Julia Townsend
7. Ambrose Spencer Townsend
8. Laura Spenser Townsend
9. Julia Isabella Townsend (1824–1906), was married to State Senator Allen Munroe (1819–1884).
10. Abby Eliza Townsend
11. John Townsend
12. Marianna Townsend

Townsend died on August 26, 1854, at age 71, in Albany, New York.
