= Claude Bloodgood =

American chess player (1937–2001)

Claude Frizzell Bloodgood
Personal information
- Born: Claude Frizzell Bloodgood III; July 14, 1937 Norfolk, Virginia, U.S.
- Died: August 4, 2001 (aged 64) Powhatan, Virginia, U.S.

Chess career
- Country: United States
- Peak rating: 2789 (June 11, 1996) (United States Chess Federation)

Claude Frizzell Bloodgood III (alias: Klaus Frizzel Bluttgutt III; July 14, 1937 – August 4, 2001) was a controversial American chess player. As a young man, he got into trouble with the law and was arrested several times. He was sentenced to death in 1970 after having been convicted of murdering his mother, although this sentence was later commuted to life in prison. While in prison, he remained a very active chess player, playing a large number of correspondence games and rated games with other inmates. Over time, he achieved a very high ranking in the United States Chess Federation (USCF) by playing in a closed pool, which allowed rating manipulation. He died in prison in 2001.

== Early life ==
Bloodgood was born in Norfolk, Virginia, to Claude Frizzell Bloodgood Jr. and Margaret B. Howell.

== Early chess career ==
In 1955, Bloodgood played a number of chess games against actor Humphrey Bogart, who was a good amateur player.

Bloodgood was an active chess organizer in Hampton Roads, Virginia in the late 1950s. He was the rating statistician for the Virginia State Chess Federation, where he rated himself at an Elo rating of 1956.

== Life in prison, chess and brief escape ==
In the early 1960s, he was twice convicted of burglary and served prison time in Delaware. He was also convicted of forgery of his parents' accounts, and spent more time in jail. In 1969, just nine days after being released from prison, he murdered his mother, Margaret Bloodgood (whom he later claimed to be his stepmother). According to reports, he rolled her body in a carpet and left it in Dismal Swamp, where it was soon found. His death sentence was ultimately commuted to life imprisonment after Furman v. Georgia, the 1972 U.S. Supreme Court ruling that the death penalty, as then administered, was unconstitutional.

From prison, Bloodgood played thousands of chess games by mail, as well as thousands with fellow inmates. He also published three books on chess openings, including The Tactical Grob (on 1.g4) ISBN 9784871878661.

In 1974, Bloodgood and fellow inmate Lewis Capleaner received a furlough to play in a chess tournament. They overpowered the single guard assigned to them and escaped, but they were recaptured after a few days.

== Legal challenges ==
Bloodgood filed two petitions for habeas corpus with the courts. His contention was that the death sentence, later commuted to life, was based in part on the fact that he was a repeat offender, having been convicted twice of burglary in Delaware. But these convictions had been obtained before the U.S. Supreme Court decision of Gideon v. Wainwright which guaranteed the right to counsel. He argued that since no defense attorney had been assigned to him in the Delaware cases, the two convictions were unconstitutional and thus the Virginia death sentence was unconstitutional as well. The courts rejected his contentions, resulting in decisions of the Virginia Supreme Court in Bloodgood v. Virginia and the United States Court of Appeals for the Fourth Circuit in Bloodgood v. Garraghty, 783 F.2d 470 (4th Cir. 1986).

== High rank possibly via manipulation ==
Bloodgood organized chess games within Powhatan Correctional Center in Powhatan, Virginia, which were by necessity with fellow inmates. Many of these inmates were taught the game by Bloodgood, and thus began as unrated and inexperienced players. Bloodgood obtained USCF memberships for them. Some accused Bloodgood, with his intimate knowledge of the rating system, of rigging their ratings. The accusation was that he arranged for new prisoners to play rated games against other prisoners, who would deliberately lose, thus giving the new inmate an inflated USCF rating. Bloodgood, it is further alleged, then played rated games against the new highly rated prisoner, and each time he won, gained a few more rating points. This continued for several years, and by 1997 his rating rose to 2759, making the 59-year-old Bloodgood the second highest rated player in the nation, behind only Gata Kamsky.

This is all a matter of considerable controversy even today. Bloodgood himself vehemently denied these accusations, and said that he played chess in the only competitions available to him, prison tournaments, and won almost every game because he was the strongest player in the prison system. As his rating rose, he wrote to the USCF to warn them that its system was prone to "closed pool" rating inflation. But nothing was done until Bloodgood's rating skyrocketed. By virtue of his high rating, Bloodgood would have qualified for entry into the U.S. Chess Championship, a prestigious invitation-only event intended for the best 16 players in the country. This caused an investigation by the USCF, which debated extensively what to do about the situation. In the end, Bloodgood was not invited to the event (which he could not have attended anyway), and the USCF changed its rating system rules to attempt to prevent "closed pool" ratings inflation from prison memberships.

== Later life in prison ==
Late in life, Bloodgood made a variety of claims that seemed designed to obtain a release from prison. For example, he claimed to have been born in 1924 and asked for a furlough based on old age. He claimed to have been born in Germany or Mexico and asked to be extradited to those countries or to be involved in prisoner exchange. He also claimed to have been a Nazi spy during World War II. He often gave interviews, trying to convince the interviewer that he was completely innocent of his crimes and a victim of mistaken identity. Bloodgood died in Powhatan Correctional Center of lung cancer on August 4, 2001.

== Library ==
The Cleveland Public Library houses the Claude F. Bloodgood Collection, which "contains the personal papers of Claude F. Bloodgood, including legal documents, medical and other prison records, and chess related items."

== Sample games ==
- Bloodgood vs. Cetenski, Winston-Salem Ladder, third match game, November 10, 1971:
  1.e4 c5 2.Nf3 d6 3.d4 cxd4 4.Nxd4 Nf6 5.Nc3 a6 6.Bg5 e6 7.f4 Qb6 8.Qd2 Qxb2 9.Rb1 Qa3 10.f5 Nc6 11.fxe6 fxe6 12.Nxc6 bxc6 13.e5! dxe5 14.Bxf6 gxf6 15.Ne4 f5? (15...Be7) 16.Be2 Be7 (if 16...fxe5 17.Bh5+ Ke7 18.0-0 Qd6 19.Rf7+ Kd8 20.Rxf8+ wins) 17.Bh5+ Kf8 18.Qh6+ Kg8 19.Rb3 1–0 Black resigns. (Notes by Bloodgood.)
- Bloodgood (2250 postal) vs. Barnsley (2475 postal, British Postal Champion), correspondence game 1997:
  1.Nf3 d5 2.b3 c5 3.e4 dxe4 4.Ne5 Nd7 5.Bb5 a6 6.Bxd7+ Bxd7 7.Bb2 Bf5 8.0-0 e6 9.f3 exf3 10.Qxf3 Qc7 11.Na3 f6 12.g4 Bg6 13.Rae1 0-0-0 14.Nec4 h5 15.g5 Bf5 16.gxf6 gxf6 17.Bc3 Qg7+ 18.Kh1 Rh6 19.Ba5 Rd4 20.Nb6+ Kb8 21.Nac4 Qc7 22.Nd5 Qc6 23.Bc7+ Ka7 24.Bb6+ ½–½ draw.

== Books ==
- The Tactical Grob. Chess, Sutton Coldfield 1976, ASIN B0007AQKAC (public domain e-book available via this page)
- Nimzovich attack: the Norfolk gambits, 1 Nf3 d5 2 b3 c5 3 e4 or 1 Nf3 d5 2 b3 Nf6 3 Bb2 c5 4 e4. Chess Digest, Grand Prairie (1997). ISBN 0-87568-289-8
- The Blackburne-Hartlaub Gambit: 1 d4 e5 2 dxe5 d6!? (Chess openings for hustlers) (1998). ISBN 0-87568-292-8
