= Joseph Colt Bloodgood =

American surgeon (1867–1935)

- Born: November 1, 1867; Milwaukee, Wisconsin U.S.
- Died: October 22, 1935 (aged 67); Baltimore, Maryland, U.S.
- Resting place: Green Mount Cemetery; Baltimore, Maryland, U.S.
- Education: University of Wisconsin (BS); University of Pennsylvania (MD)
- Occupation: Surgeon
- Known for: Rubber gloves, early diagnosis
- Spouse: Edith Holt (m. 1908)
- Children: 2
- Relatives: Frans Bloetgoet

Signature
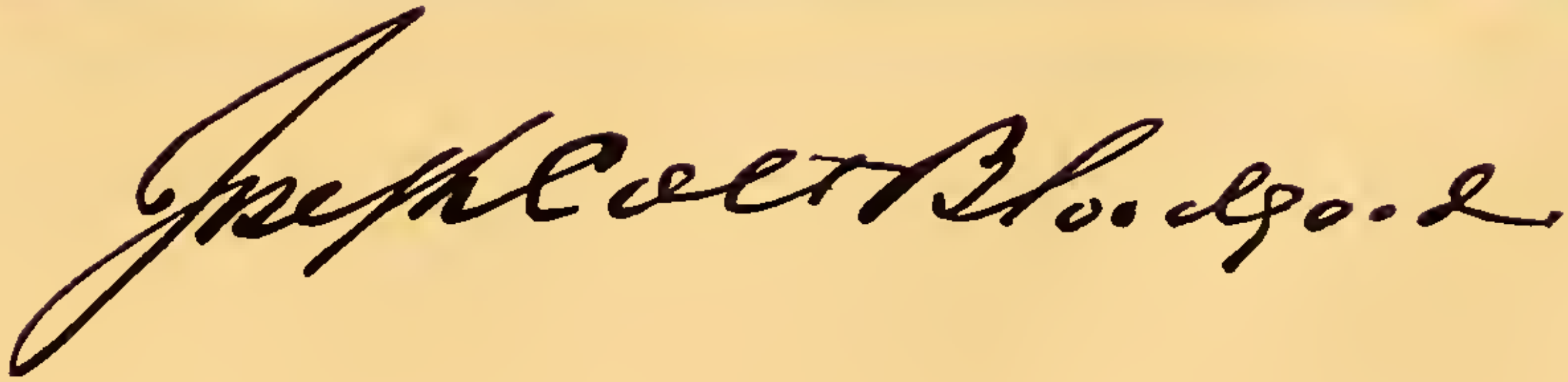

Joseph Colt Bloodgood (November 1, 1867 – October 22, 1935) was a prominent surgeon in the United States based in Johns Hopkins Hospital in Baltimore, Maryland. He was known for insisting on the use of rubber gloves by the entire surgical team, for advances in methods of identifying and treating benign and malignant cancers, particularly breast and bone cancers, and for advocating education of the public so they would seek routine medical examinations, even before any signs of cancer appeared.

== Birth and education ==
Joseph Colt Bloodgood was born on November 1, 1867, in Milwaukee, Wisconsin, son of Francis Bloodgood and Josephine Colt. He was a descendant of Frans Bloetgoet, a Dutch emigrant who had moved to Flushing, Long Island in 1658. His father and uncles were successful lawyers in Wisconsin. His brothers Francis Bloodgood Jr. and Wheeler Peckham Bloodgood were both to become prominent lawyers. He attended the University of Wisconsin, graduating with a Bachelor of Science degree in 1888. His science studies were in histology and embryology, and included making histological sections of tissues for study under the microscope. He went on to the University of Pennsylvania, gaining an M.D. in 1891.

== Career ==
From 1891 to 1892 Bloodgood was resident physician at the Children's Hospital of Philadelphia. Between June and November 1892 he was Assistant Resident Surgeon at Johns Hopkins Hospital in Baltimore. His first mentor in medical studies in Philadelphia, the eminent Canadian physician William Osler, helped him obtain this position. After six months in this position he was sent to Europe for a year for further studies. He visited the main European centers of surgery and pathology, and met the pathologists Friedrich Daniel von Recklinghausen and Theodor Billroth.

Bloodgood became Resident Surgeon at Johns Hopkins Hospital when he returned in 1893. He worked under Dr. William Stewart Halsted, a pioneer in surgical techniques in the United States, who greatly influenced his thinking. In 1897 he was appointed chief assistant to Halsted and was given the task of setting up the Surgical Pathology department at Johns Hopkins and teaching this subject. He remained at Johns Hopkins throughout the remainder of his life. He was Associate Professor of Surgery from 1903 to 1914, Associate Professor of Clinical Surgery from 1914 to 1927 and Clinical Professor of Surgery from 1927 until 1935.

In 1906 Bloodgood was appointed Chief of the Medical Staff at Saint Agnes Sanitarium in Baltimore, which was converted into the Saint Agnes Hospital, a general hospital. He retained this position until his death in 1935. At Saint Agnes he introduced the Intern Education Program, a surgical residency based on the program Halstead had established at the Johns Hopkins Hospital. He was a founder of the American Society for the Control of Cancer and the American Association for the Study of Neoplastic Diseases. He founded the Amanda Sims Memorial Fund in 1930 with the goal of raising women's awareness of cervical cancer. He also became Director of the Garvan Research Laboratory and of the James Colt Bloodgood Cancer Research Fund.

On September 1, 1908, Bloodgood married Edith Holt, daughter of the publisher Henry Holt. They had two children, Joseph and Winnifred. In 1905 Edith and her sister Winifred Holt had co-founded the New York Association for the Blind, later to grow into Lighthouse International. Edith continued to be active with this charity, which provided the opportunity for blind people to do useful work. In response to critics she wrote "Some went as far as to say that it would be cruel to add to the burden of infirmity the burden of labor, as if to be without work were not the heaviest burden mortal could be called upon to endure."

Dr. Joseph Colt Bloodgood died on October 22, 1935, at his home at 44 Warrentown Road in Baltimore. He was buried at Green Mount Cemetery in Baltimore. His sudden death was caused by coronary thrombosis.

== Work ==
=== Use of gloves ===
As a resident at Johns Hopkins Hospital in Baltimore, Bloodgood was aware of the introduction of rubber gloves in the operating room by nurse Caroline Hampton working with surgeon William Stewart Halsted. Ten years later, in 1899, Bloodgood published results showing that use of rubber gloves during surgery reduced postsurgical infection rates from 17% to less than 2%, a staggering effect. Bloodgood became the first surgeon to demand that everyone involved in an operation wear rubber gloves.

=== Cancer diagnosis and treatment ===
Bloodgood followed Halstead's advice in taking care to control bleeding during surgery so as to avoid the need for excessive haste. The probability of curing the patient was much higher with a careful and systematic approach to removing all cancerous tissue. Bloodgood became extremely skilled with microscopic examination and diagnosis. Other surgeons often referred slides to Bloodgood when they were uncertain about the pathology. He noted that "when cancer becomes a microscopic disease, there must be tissue diagnosis in the operating room". He would take many tissue samples during an operation, and would leave an operation while he prepared and examined the frozen sections. He would also temporarily leave one operation to take part in another.

Bloodgood was among the first to describe "borderline" lesions, saying that a biopsy specimen would often contain "a pre-existing local defect which is benign and in which later there may be a cancerous development." He published a paper on Diagnosis and Treatment of Border-Line Pathological Lesions as early as 1914. He thought various types of cellular pattern could indicate precancerous growth, but after 1930 was most interested in what is now called carcinoma in situ.

In 1906, Bloodgood agreed with the German pathologist Curt Schimmelbusch that the chronic cystic mastitis was a precancerous condition and should be treated, but by 1921 he had found that patients with this condition did not develop malignancies when untreated. He still recommended surgery in borderline cases since it would be safer to remove a benign growth than to leave a possibly malignant growth, and the operation "produces no harm but mutilation". By the 1930s he had become a strong opponent of mastectomy as a treatment for cystic mastitis.

As he became increasingly confident about distinguishing between benign, premalignant and malignant processes he became insistent on using biopsy to determine whether surgery was needed, avoiding unneeded mastectomies but treating premalignant lesions before they developed. Bloodgood was a pioneer in breast-conservation surgery, recommending local excision "when the palpable tumor is small and can be excised completely by cutting through normal breast tissue and closing the wound without injury to the symmetry of the breast."

Bloodgood was quick to make use of X-rays, discovered in 1895, to investigate bone tumors. He was an early adopter of irradiation as a cancer treatment. He was awarded a gold medal by the Radiological Society of North America for his use of X-rays and radium to study, diagnose and treat malignant bone tumors. Bloodgood found that "giant-cell sarcoma" were bone tissue reactions to irritants rather than malignant growths, and could be cured by curettage rather than by amputating the limb. Bloodgood thought that the correlation of mouth and throat cancer with tobacco user could be due at least in part to irritation of the tissues by some substance in the tobacco, which would be aggravated by poor oral hygiene. He said in 1932 that "the modern woman who keeps her teeth clean and in good shape teaches men how one should smoke with a minimal risk of cancer."

=== Data collection and analysis ===
A hallmark of Bloodgood's approach was obsessive collection of data. By 1923 he had accumulated records of symptoms, treatment and results of operations on 33,000 patients. He was a pioneer in following up patients with yearly medical examinations, and from this found that some tumors that had been considered malignant were in fact benign. He was able to conduct large-scale statistical analysis of his data, correlating different variables, a unique approach for the time. Bloodgood tended to rely on his own very extensive data, and rarely cited others in his works. Sir Lenthal Cheatle noted this propensity in a 1932 letter to Sir Harold Stiles, saying "I expect Bloodgood will annex your letter. I have noticed he collects a great deal of information of which he makes no particular use." (Note: To be fair, Cheatle's work also rarely referenced the work of others.)

=== Teaching ===
During the day Bloodgood worked in the hospital wards and operating rooms. He taught and studied in the evenings. His students gave him the nickname "Bloody". As a teacher, Bloodgood was innovative in familiarizing his students with unusual conditions by using specimens from the museum along with pamphlets that described their relevant features. He also used up to four simultaneous lantern projectors to simultaneously display different aspects of a case being discussed. He drove himself and his team hard, and worked seven days a week. As his reputation grew, many budding surgeons came to Johns Hopkins to study under him and to access the unique collection of material at the laboratory. He and his students published many papers on surgical pathology.

=== Public education ===
Bloodgood considered that his own most important finding was that cancer usually developed in abnormal tissue, which could be detected and treated before serious malignancy had developed. Some of his ideas about the relationship of cancer and abnormal tissue may have been suggested to him by Cheatle's whole-organ sections. However, Cheatle in London and Bloodgood in Baltimore had no direct contact, and may have worked independently in their studies of the differences between benign and malignant breast lesions.

Bloodgood claimed that 90% of breast malignancies could be cured if detected early. However, he said that at the beginning of the twentieth century 90% of treatments were for more advanced malignancies. Writing in Good Housekeeping, a women's magazine, in 1927 he said: "false modesty, chiefly on the part of the public press, has made it difficult to get the correct information to the public." He repeated in 1933 "Armed with intelligence and enlightenment, it is hoped that women soon will banish false modesty, which has in the past been in large measure responsible for the lack of advance in the control of cancer of cervix for the womb."

Bloodgood spoke at public meetings, wrote articles in newspapers and spoke on the radio advocating routine checks for individuals even though they were showing no symptoms. Bloodgood also worked with other doctors to increase focus on early identification of malignancy within the profession. According to a 1933 article in Time magazine, his motto was "get an early diagnosis, no matter if you must scare the wits out of the people." Some of his colleagues thought that he was doing this to persuade private patients to pay for needless examinations, resulting in controversy and unfair treatment of Bloodgood later in his career.

== Partial bibliography ==
- Bloodgood, Joseph Colt (1899). Operations on 459 cases of hernia in the Johns Hopkins hospital from June, 1889, to January, 1899. Friedenwald Company. ISBN 9785872980544.
- Bloodgood, Joseph Colt (1910). Benign Bone Cysts, Ostitis Fibrosa, Giant-cell Sarcoma and Bone Aneurism of the Long Pipe Bones: A Clinical and Pathological Study with the Conclusion that Conservative Treatment is Justifiable.
- Bloodgood, Joseph Colt (1915). Military Surgery. Progressive Medicine.
- Bloodgood, Joseph Colt (1917). The Breast. Blakiston.
- Bloodgood, Joseph Colt (1920). The Diagnosis and treatment of benign and malignant tumors of bone. s.n.
- Bloodgood, Joseph Colt (1924). Xanthomas: Introduction. American Medical Association.
- Bloodgood, Joseph Colt (1924). Pagets Disease of the Female Nipple, a Preventable Disease, Curable in Its Early Stages: A Study of Thirty Cases.
- Bloodgood, Joseph Colt (1926). The Facts about Cancer. Haldeman-Julius Company.
- Bloodgood, Joseph Colt (1929). The Greatest Scourge in the World; Cancer and How it Can be Eradicated.
- Geschickter, Charles Freeman; Bloodgood, Joseph Colt; Copeland, Murray Marcus; Lewis, Dean (1936). Tumors of Bone Including the Jaws and Joints. American Journal of cancer.

== Notes and references ==
Notes

Citations

Sources

- "150 Years of Saint Agnes Hospital". Saint Agnes Hospital. Archived from the original on November 4, 2011.
- A.G.N. (December 1935). "Joseph Colt Bloodgood, B.Sc., M.D". Canadian Medical Association Journal. 33 (6). Canada: Canadian Medical Association: 665–666. PMC 1561507. PMID 20320104.
- Finney, John M T (January 1937). "Memoirs: Joseph Colt Bloodgood 1867–1935". Annals of Surgery. 105 (1). United States, United Kingdom: Lippincott Williams & Wilkins: 150–151. doi:10.1097/00000658-193701000-00014. PMC 1390300. PMID 17856902.
- Gregory, John Goadby (1931). "Wheeler Peckham Bloodgood". History of Milwaukee, Wisconsin. Clarke Publishing Company.
- Grunwald, Henry; Ackermann, Mark G. (September 25, 2012). Twilight: Losing Sight, Gaining Insight. Random House Digital, Inc. p. 102. ISBN 978-0-345-80396-2.
- Hannan, Caryn (December 1, 2008). "BLOODGOOD, JOSEPH COLT". Wisconsin Biographical Dictionary. North American Book Dist LLC. ISBN 978-1-878592-63-7.
- James, Ellen Malino (1971). "HOLT, Winifred". In James, Edward T.; James, Janet Wilson; Boyer, Paul S. (eds.). Notable American Women, 1607-1950: A Biographical Dictionary. Notable American Women: 1607–1950. Vol. 2 P–Z. Harvard University Press. ISBN 9780674627345.
- "JOSEPH COLT BLOODGOOD". American Journal of Cancer. 26 (2). February 1936.
- Lerner, Barron H. (May 31, 2001). The Breast Cancer Wars:Hope, Fear, and the Pursuit of a Cure in Twentieth-Century America: Hope, Fear, and the Pursuit of a Cure in Twentieth-Century America. Oxford University Press. p. 28. ISBN 978-0-19-514261-7.
- Lester, Susan Carole (July 27, 2010). Manual of Surgical Pathology: Expert Consult - Online and Print. Elsevier Health Sciences. p. 45. ISBN 978-0-323-06516-0.
- Löwy, Ilana (December 29, 2009). Preventive Strikes: Women, Precancer, and Prophylactic Surgery. JHU Press. ISBN 978-0-8018-9364-3.
- Lowy, Ilana (November 10, 2011). A Woman's Disease:The history of cervical cancer: The history of cervical cancer. Oxford University Press. ISBN 978-0-19-954881-1.
- Mansel, Robert E.; Sweetland, Helen M..; Hughes, L. E. (2009). "Joseph Colt Bloodgood. 1867–1935". Hughes, Mansel & Webster's Benign Disorders and Diseases of the Breast. Elsevier Health Sciences. ISBN 978-0-7020-2774-1.
- Rosen, Paul Peter (2001). Rosen's Breast Pathology, 2e. Lippincott Williams & Wilkins. ISBN 978-0-7817-2379-4.
- Shaikh, Saad (February 28, 2007). Eyes on Ice & No Blind Mice: Visions of Science from the Science of Vision. AuthorHouse. ISBN 978-1-4259-8023-8.
- Wailoo, Keith (January 7, 2011). How Cancer Crossed the Color Line. Oxford University Press. ISBN 978-0-19-975291-1.
- "Private Funeral For Dr. Bloodgood". The Evening Sun. October 23, 1935. p. 5 – via Newspapers.com.
