= Katherine Bloodgood =

American singer

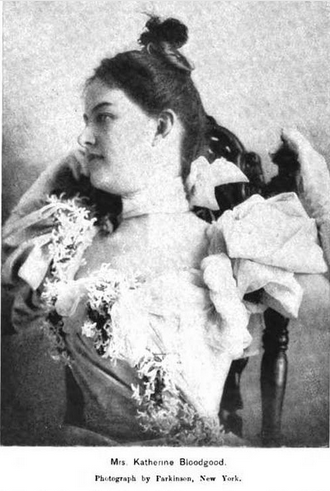
- Katherine Bloodgood, from an 1897 publication
- Born: Katherine Spencer; April 24, 1871; Ithaca, New York, U.S.
- Died: January 1967 (aged 95); Los Angeles, California, U.S.
- Occupations: Singer, vaudeville performer
- Spouse(s): William Denton Bloodgood (m. 1889-1899); Howard Hapgood Kipp (m. 1902)
- Children: 3

Katherine Spencer Bloodgood Kipp (April 24, 1871 – January 1967) was an American contralto singer and vaudeville performer.

== Early life ==
Katherine "Kitty" Spencer was born in Ithaca, New York and raised in San Diego, California.

== Career ==
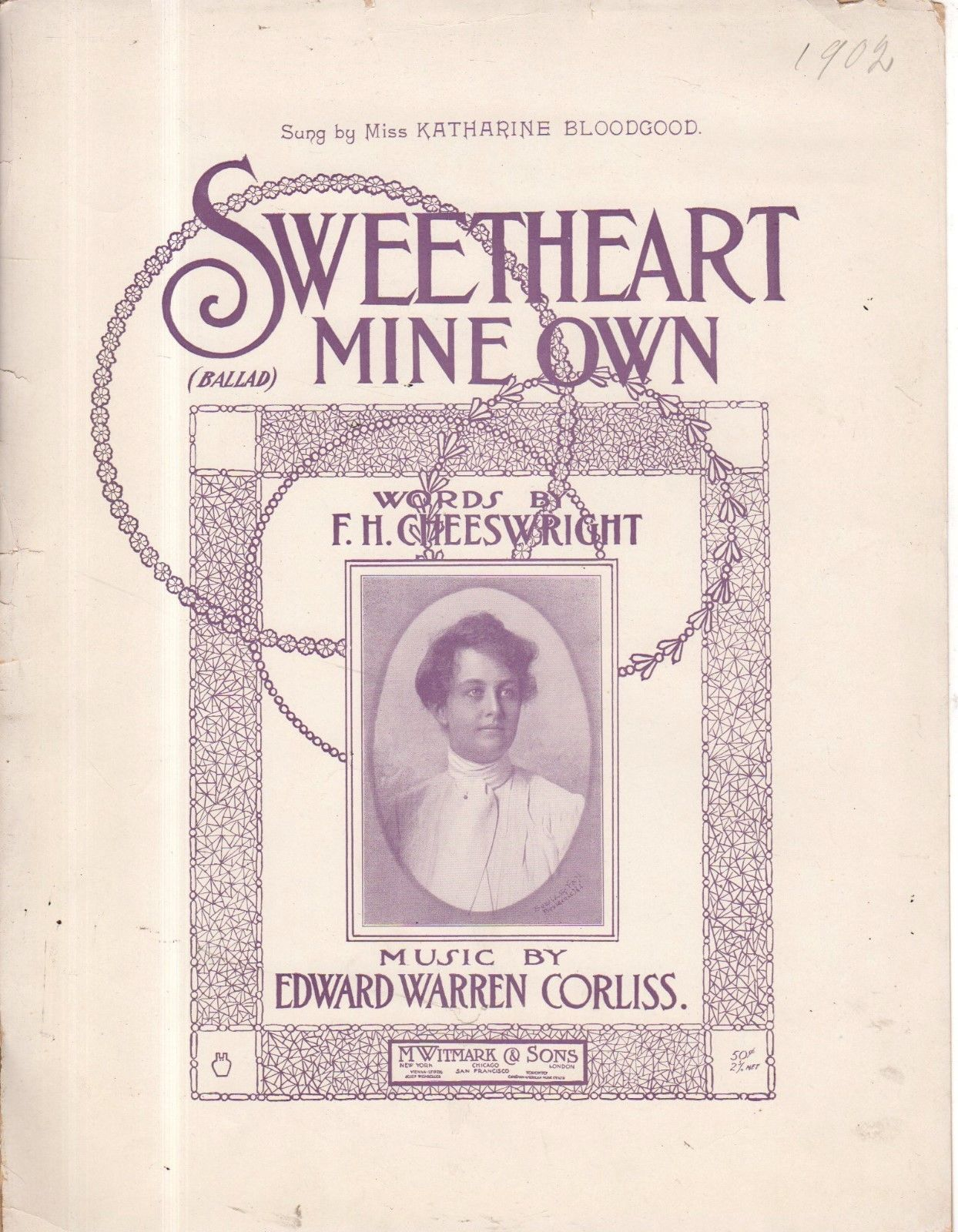
Ballad by Edward Warren Corliss sung by Katherine Bloodgood

Bloodgood was a contralto singer of "singular power, richness, beauty and breadth", according to one reviewer, who also noted her "fine stage presence" and that she sang equally well in German and English. She performed for the Manuscript Society of New York in 1897, and at Carnegie Hall in 1898, where the New York Times reviewer said she "sang with the assurance and aplomb of an experienced artist."

In 1898, as a celebrated beauty, she sold kisses at a charity fair in St. Louis, Missouri, sometimes for as much as $500 a kiss. This publicity stunt was cited by her husband as a cause for their widely publicized divorce a year later.

After her divorce, she was often featured on programs that included a wide range of performance genres. "She has decided to stay in the vaudeville field, at least for a time, as she finds it much more lucrative than the concert field," explained a San Francisco magazine. In 1904 Bloodgood appeared on a vaudeville bill with Blind Tom Wiggins at an opera house in Rochester, New York, just months before Wiggins's health ended his long performing career. In 1906, she was "the artistic number" on a Washington, D.C., variety program that included acrobats, comedians, and trained animals.

== Personal life ==
Katherine Spencer married twice. She was first wed to William Denton Bloodgood in 1889, when she was 17 years old. This marriage ended in divorce in 1899. She married again in 1902, to Howard Hapgood Kipp, a Marine officer. She had two sons, Elwyn Lynotte Bloodgood (1890-1935) and Hapgood Kipp (1907-2000), and a daughter, Eleanore Mayo Kipp (born 1909 in the Philippines). Elwyn may have accompanied Lieutenant Kipp to a posting on Guam in 1903.

Katherine Spencer Bloodgood Kipp died in 1967, in Los Angeles, California, aged 95 years.
