= Frans Jansen Bloetgoet =

Captain Frans Jansen Bloetgoet (anglicized to Francis Bloodgood) (c. 1632 – 29 December 1676) was a Netherlander who immigrated to Flushing, Queens, He is the ancestor of the American Bloodgood family.

== Biography ==
Frans Janszen Bloetgoet was born around 1632. He was the son of Jan Heyndrickse Goetbloet (or Bloetgoet) and Geertgen Thomas, both of Gouda, South Holland. He was living on the Corten Tiendewech, Gouda when he married Lysbeth Jans, of Gouda on 18 February 1654 at Reeuwijk, near Gouda.

The couple emigrated soon after their marriage. They brought with them their child, Geertie when they emigrated to New Amsterdam in 1659. Bloodgood was made secretary to the Colonies on the Delaware River in 1659. They moved to Flushing, and Bloodgood was appointed Schepen of Flushing in 1673. Bloodgood had acquired land, sheep and cattle by the time of his death. Frans Bloetgoet and his wife both belonged to the New York Dutch Church, and all but two of their children were baptized there. On 24 May 1674 he was made chief officer of the Dutch militia of the settlements of Flushing, Hempstead, Jamaica and Newtown. He died on 29 December 1676. His widow married Wouter Gysberts of Hilversum three years later.

== Descendants ==
Bloodgood's children were Geertie (1658), Adriana (1660), Isabella (1662), Judith (1665), William (1667), Neeltie (1670), John (1672) and Lysbeth (1675). Their daughter Neeltje married Samuel Waldron of Harlem, New York on 5 March 1692. In 1687 William Bloodgood was in Lieutenant Schuvler's troop. In 1703 he was elected vestryman for Jamaica parish, and in 1714 he was Justice of the Peace. Frans Bloodgood's descendants moved to Albany, New York, (some becoming wealthy people) and New Jersey.

James Bloodgood, Frans Bloetgoet's grandson, was a merchant of Albany involved in the West Indian Trade. His son Francis Bloodgood (12 June 1775 – 5 March 1840) became Mayor of Albany. The mayor's grandson Francis Bloodgood was a prominent lawyer, father of the surgeon Joseph Colt Bloodgood (1 November 1867 – 22 October 1935), a pioneer in breast cancer research and Wheeler Peckham Bloodgood (4 November 1871 – 17 December 1930), a lawyer active in anti-trust reforms.

== Notes and references ==
=== References ===
- Bloodgood Parker, Annie (March 1917). "Captain Frans Bloodgood of Flushing, Long Island and Some of his Descendants". The Pennsylvania Genealogical Magazine. Vol. 6, no. 3. Genealogical Society of Pennsylvania. pp. 229–141. LCCN 21008416. OCLC 866758903.
- Currey, Josiah Seymour (1922). "Wheeler Peckham Bloodgood". History of Milwaukee, City and County. S. J. Clarke Publishing Company.
- Dobson, John Blythe (2007). "The Earliest Generations of the Goetbloet Alias Bloetgoet Family" (PDF). John Blythe Dobson. OCLC 237098173.
- Hannan, Caryn (December 1, 2008). "Bloodgood, Joseph Colt". Wisconsin Biographical Dictionary. North American Book Dist LLC. ISBN 978-1-8785-9263-7. OCLC 300450813.
- Howell, George Rogers; Tenney, Jonathan, eds. (1886). Bi-Centennial History of Albany: History of the County of Albany, N.Y., From 1609 to 1886. W. W. Munsell & Company. LCCN 01014041. OCLC 2367801.
- Reynolds, Cuyler (1911). Hudson-Mohawk Genealogical and Family Memoirs: A Record of Achievements of the People of the Hudson and Mohawk Valleys in New York State, Included Within the Present Counties of Albany, Rensselaer, Washington, Saratoga, Montgomery, Fulton, Schenectady, Columbia and Greene. Lewis Historical Publishing Company.
- Riker, James Jr. (1970) [1881]. Harlem: Its Origins and Early Annals. Ardent Media. LCCN 78104551.
  - —— (1904). Hudson-Mohawk Genealogical and Family Memoirs: A Record of Achievements of the People of the Hudson and Mohawk Valleys in New York State, Included Within the Present Counties of Albany, Rensselaer, Washington, Saratoga, Montgomery, Fulton, Schenectady, Columbia and Greene. New Harlem Publishing Company.
- Rogers, Samuel Emory (1925). The Ancestry and Descendants of John Alexander Thompson Nexsen. Joshua Nexsen. OCLC 6231087.
