= St. Agnes Hospital (Baltimore) =

Saint Agnes Hospital
- Ascension Health
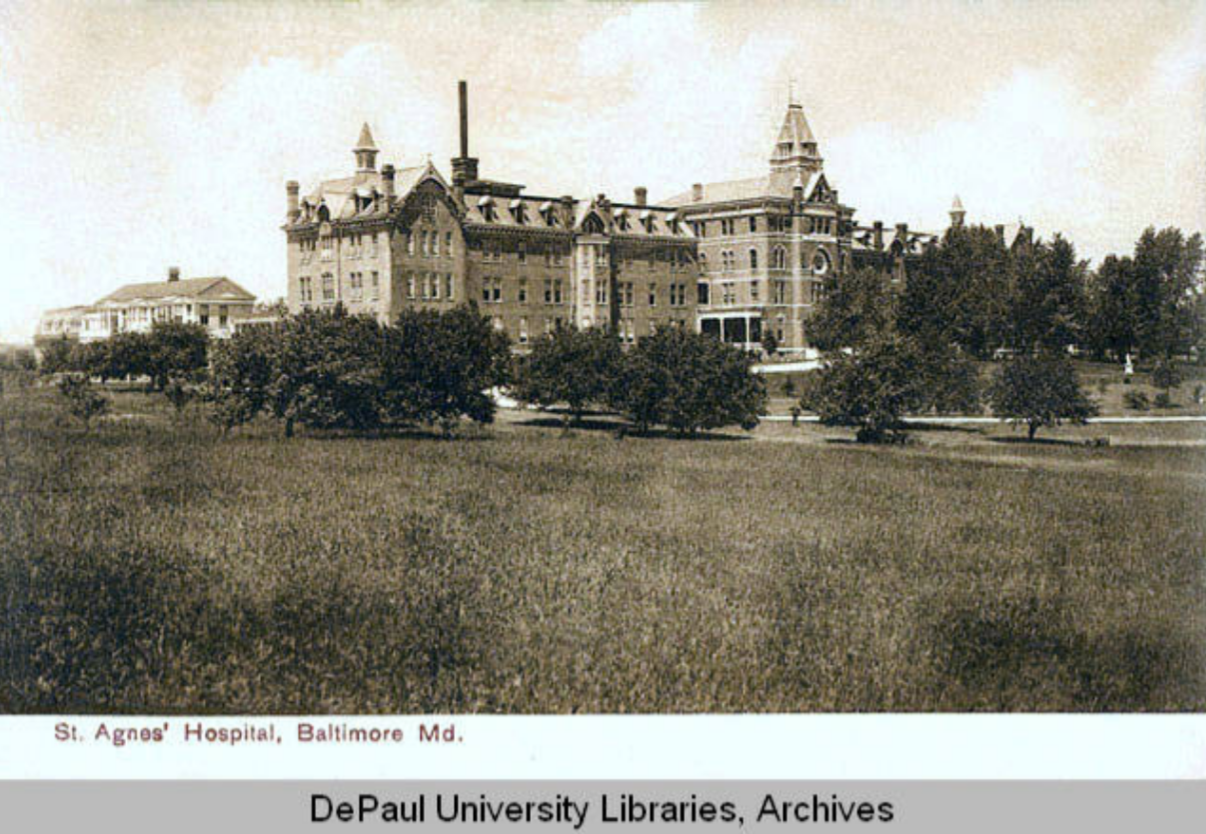
- 1913 post card image of St. Agnes Hospital

- Location in Baltimore Location in Maryland Location in United States

Geography
- Location: 900 S. Caton Avenue, Baltimore, Maryland, United States
- Coordinates: 39°16′19″N 76°40′22″W

Organization
- Care system: Public
- Type: Community
- Affiliated university: The Johns Hopkins Hospital and the University of Maryland Medical Center

Services
- Emergency department: Yes
- Beds: 254

Helipads
- Helipad: (ICAO: 12MD)

History
- Founded: 1823

Links
- Website: www.stagnes.org
- Lists: Hospitals in Maryland

Saint Agnes Hospital in Baltimore, Maryland is a full-service teaching hospital located at 900 S. Caton Avenue.

It is licensed and accredited with a Gold Seal of Approval from the Joint Commission, is designated as an American Society for Bariatric Surgery Bariatric Surgery Center of Excellence and is a Level IIIB Perinatal Referral Center for Maryland. St. Agnes Hospital is a member of Ascension Health, the largest non-profit health care organization in the nation.

== History ==
The first Catholic hospital in Baltimore, Saint Agnes hospital has a long tradition of Catholic health care ministry serving the people of their community with a special concern for those who are poor and vulnerable.

It was founded in 1823, as the Baltimore Infirmary, by the Daughters of Charity to provide nursing care for the poor. In 1876 the facility moved to its present location. In 1898 it became a sanitarium for patients who had a mental illness or drug addiction. The hospital was reorganized as a full-service hospital in 1906 with the appointment of Dr. Joseph Colt Bloodgood as Chief of the Medical Staff, and continues to host the country's second oldest surgery residency program.

== Chest Pain Emergency Center ==
Raymond D. Bahr, M.D. is credited with the Early Heart Attack Care (EHAC). The first Chest Pain Emergency Center in the world began at Saint Agnes Hospital in Baltimore, Maryland. Developed in response to sudden death problems from heart attacks in the community, the idea of having a Chest Pain Center as part of the emergency department along with an educational community awareness program quickly spread across the nation and around the world.

== Site for International Early Lung Cancer Action Program ==
The Lung Cancer Treatment Center at Saint Agnes is a lung cancer screening site for the International Early Lung Cancer Action Program (I-ELCAP).

== Publications ==
Saint Agnes Hospital publishes a free magazine called 360: Your Health From Every Angle. The magazine reviews new health services from the hospital and includes healthy living tips. It also publishes a health e-newsletter.

== Off-site facilities ==
- Seton Imaging Center
- Seton Medical Group
