= Philip Livingston Magnet Academy =

- Philip Livingston Junior High School
- U.S. National Register of Historic Places
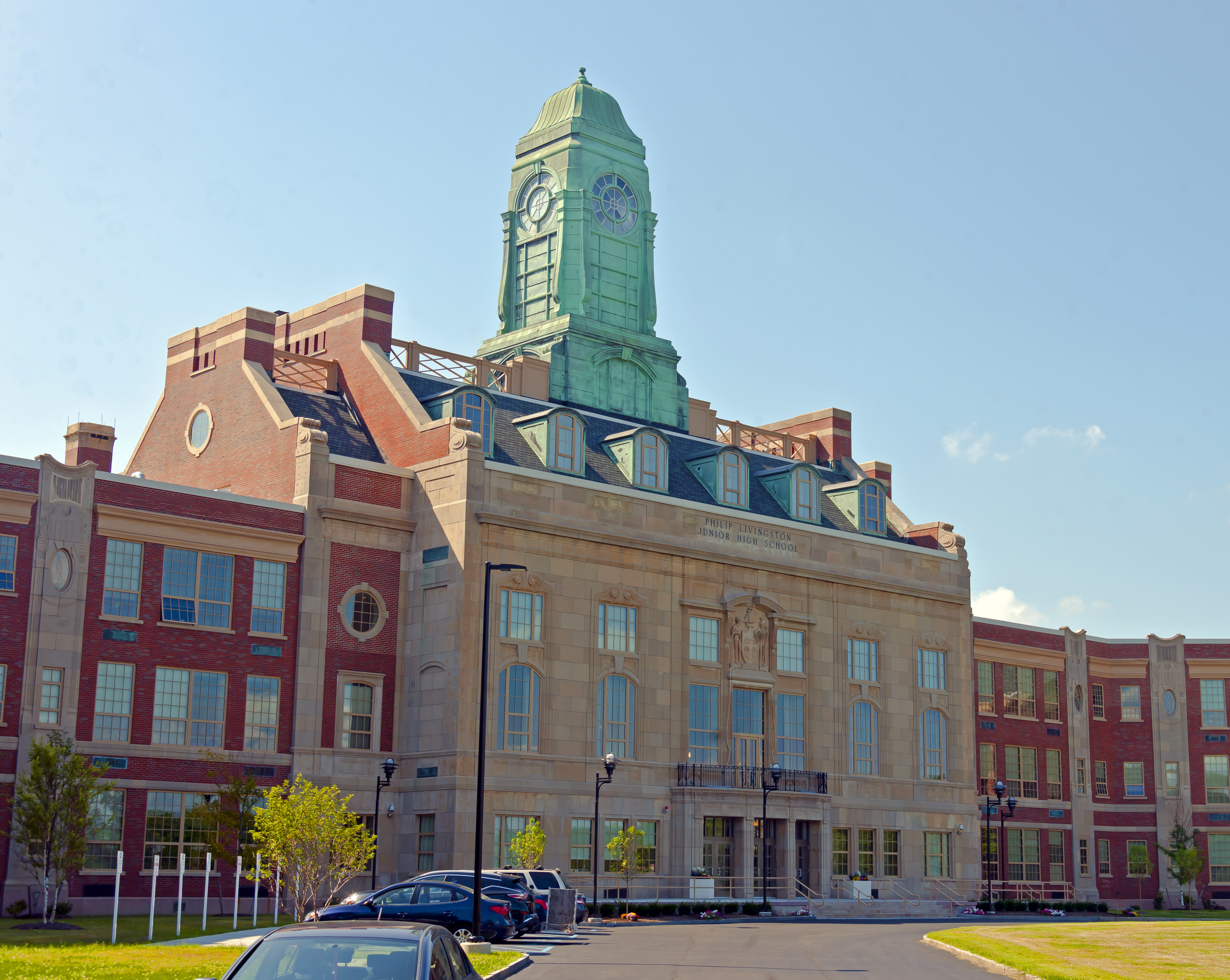
- East (front) elevation of main block, 2015

- Location within New York Location within the United States
- Location: Albany, NY
- Coordinates: 42°40′06″N 73°45′31″W
- Area: 9.83 acres (3.98 ha)
- Built: 1931-1932, 1947, 1967
- Architect: Andrew Delehanty
- Architectural style: Colonial Revival, Art Deco
- NRHP reference No.: 14000485
- Added to NRHP: August 18, 2014

The former Philip Livingston Magnet Academy is located along Northern Boulevard in the West Hill neighborhood of Albany, New York, United States. It is a large brick building predominantly in the Colonial Revival architectural style, with some Art Deco touches inside, erected during the 1930s. Additions were made in the 1960s. In 2014 it was listed on the National Register of Historic Places as the Philip Livingston Junior High School, the only purpose-built public school building in the city so recognized. (Note: The Old Albany Academy Building, the only other purpose-built school building individually listed in the city, originally housed a private school.)

During most of its existence, it was one of four middle schools operated by the City School District of Albany, later converted into a magnet school for its final years, during which it declined academically and developed a reputation for crime and violence. It was described as the city's most outstanding school building upon its opening. It also became one of Albany's architectural landmarks due to its location at the main arrival point for travelers arriving from, or passing by, the city's north. Since its closure it has been sold to a private developer and converted to senior housing, a decision some members of the school board have come to regret as the district still has overcrowding issues.

From its inception the school played a role in developing the community, an early center of African American migration into Albany, beyond its educational function. The Albany Symphony Orchestra played its concerts in the building's auditorium for many years. Amelia Earhart spoke at the school, and a 1947 concert by Paul Robeson at the school caused a major local controversy when the city government attempted to block it due to the performer's known sympathies with the Communist Party.

== Building and grounds ==
The school building is located at the south end of a 9.83-acre (3.98 ha) parcel at the west corner of Albany's West Hill neighborhood, a mile and a half (2.4 km) north of the city's downtown. The terrain around the building is drastically different. On the south it remains relatively level; in the other directions it drops off roughly 100 feet (30 m) into one of the ravines carrying small tributaries of the Hudson River that characterize Albany's topography in the eastern section of the city.

On the south side of the building, across McCrossin Avenue, are detached single-family homes on small lots. These continue into the rest of the city. On the east, across the wider Northern Boulevard, or Dudley Heights, there are more residences, on larger lots, with some businesses. Behind them is undeveloped land, a buffer zone for railroad tracks used by CSX freight trains and Amtrak's Empire Service passenger trains. To the northeast, is the elaborate multilevel interchange of U.S. Route 9 and Interstate 90.

North of the school property, on either side of the street, are two charter schools, KIPP Tech Valley on the east and Green Tech High on the west across Manning Boulevard North. Beyond them is wooded buffer, the railroad tracks and the interstate. To the west is the 82-acre (33 ha) Tivoli Nature Preserve, centered around Tivoli Lake, the largest urban protected area in the state after New York City's Central Park.

Most of the school property is taken up by a large athletic practice field, with soccer goals, to the north of the building. Park Drive borders it on its west and comes around the south to serve as the main entry road, with some parking spaces on its south side. A larger parking lot is located on the south side of the building, accessed from the intersection of McCrossin and Thornton Street.

=== Building ===
The building itself is a three-story, Y-shaped, steel frame building clad in brick and cast stone. It consists of a three-story central pavilion with flanking wings themselves ending in pavilions. On the west of the central section is a shorter wing housing the building's auditorium.

==== Exterior ====
In the center, the main block consists of the five-bay central pavilion, flanked with a recessed bay on either side. Both the main and recessed portions have a gambrel roof with parapets along their end walls. A tall copper-clad cupola rises from the center.

On the east (front) elevation, the pavilion is faced in cast stone imitating a coursed ashlar pattern. In the middle, the three bays of the entrance are recessed in a projecting section of their own, flanked by pilasters and topped with a paneled frieze. To either side are three six-over-six lower-level hopper sash windows with a splayed pattern in the cast stone above. At the corner of the front pavilion's first story is a similar window with four-pane sidelights. The corner face is set with four-light triple-hung sash. The recessed bay on the ends of the front pavilion is set with six-over-six with sidelights similar to those at the flanks of the middle section; the corners are quoined

A stone beltcourse divides the first and second stories. At the center a decorative wrought iron fence makes for a small balcony atop the entrance. The top of the fence is level with a ribbon course that also serves as the sill for windows on that story.

At the center of the second story is an aluminum double door, each with eight narrow lights, flanked by four more such lights on the side, topped by a rectangular 15-light transom. On each side are double-hung 12-over-6 sash with a lower hopper, flanked by fluted pilasters that rise to the next story. The two bays to their sides are set with nine-over-six double-hung lower-hopper sash in an arched surround with a keystone and five-light sidelights, on a brick face. Below each is a recessed panel. Around the corner, the bay is blind, recessed below another arch. The recessed bay is set with eight-over-eight double-hung lower-hopper arched sash in a decorative surround.

The third story has a carving of the city of Albany's coat of arms in the center, topped by a broken arch pediment with dentilled cornice. It is flanked by two 12-light windows with sills and dentilled cornices supported by a scroll bracket on the side next to the coat of arms. Recessed panels are above and below both.

Flanking on the next two bays are two nine-light windows with three-light sides topped by a broken scroll pediment, their sills resting on the keystones below. The corner bay is set with a plain, recessed blind panel. Next to it on the end bay is an oculus with keystones at the cardinal points in a stone surround, set with a 16-pane grid.

Above the third story is a frieze and cornice. Between those and the roofline is an entablature with five recessed panels. In the middle one, wider than the other four, is set metal lettering reading "Philip Livingston Junior High School".

The roof is clad in asphalt shingles. On the east side it is pierced by six segmental-arched dormer windows sided in copper. They are set with four-over-four double-hung sash with a lower hopper and four-light sides. Large scroll brackets mark the end of the north and south parapets.

Wooden fencing on the east and west sets off the flat top of the roof. On the brick-faced north and south of the central section, an oculus similar to the one on the third-story corners is located in the center. The parapets have a recessed central portion with cast stone coping and a stone course in the middle of the central portion.

The cupola has three stages. At its base the square pedestal is clad on all sides to resemble the upper half of the second-story windows. On the corners of the north and south faces are short projections connecting to the wooden fence topped with scroll brackets. A cornice sets off the second stage, with scrolled pilasters on the corners framing a paneled section topped by a circular window with radiating muntins set in a molded surround with a keystone. The third stage, at the top, is a grooved curving roof topped by a small finial.

Both wings have a similar design. A cast stone water table at ground level is topped by 16-light windows with an eight-light lower hopper, with smaller versions at the corners. At the lintel level is a cast stone beltcourse, with a wider one above serving as the sill line for similar windows, also found above. Topping those windows is a cast stone frieze that ends below the applied metal at the roofline.

Engaged cast stone piers divide the facade at regular intervals. Within them the first and second stories are set with rectangular windows similar to those in the central pavilion's dormers without the sidelights; the third story has an elliptical oculus. Above it is some decorative stonework and an inverted arch at the roofline.

The pavilion at the south end is similar in plan and treatment to the central pavilion, seven bays by three, three stories tall and topped with a gambrel roof and parapet. In the center of the first floor, at the top of some stone steps, is a monumental entrance with double door framed by decorative cast stone, topped with a broken arch pediment. Above it is a similarly treated window.

All other windows are tall 12-over-8 with a lower hopper. Corners are quoined in cast stone. As with the east facade, stone beltcourses serve as the lintel line for the first story windows and the sill for those immediately above. The centers of both gables are set with oculi similar to those on the main section. The north pavilion is similar, but with a more modest central door meant primarily as an exit.

The south and west (rear) facades of the two wings are less decorative. Most windows are set with lower-hopper windows of the same size as their counterparts on the front but with no paning; there is an area of the rear of the south wing on the second and third stories where this pattern is interrupted for some irregularly sized and placed windows. A small three-bay shed-roofed projection, with glass windows on all sides to the roofline, is along the middle of the first story. The roofline of the wings is decorated only with a strip of applied metal.

On the west side the central pavilion's end bays are not recessed; there is a secondary entrance with double doors and stone surround on the south corner. A six-by-five-bay wing projects westward from it, three stories high, faced in brick with a flat roof. At its rear is a freestanding brick chimney stack, counted as a separate, contributing structure for the purposes of the National Register listing.

The four eastern bays on the north and south facades of the auditorium wing are set with simulated sash, broken by vertical and horizontal mullions, two stories tall rising from a stone beltcourse sill within slightly recessed round arches with keystones at the top. In the fourth and fifth bay exposed basement levels are a pair of double-door entrances with stone surrounds. The fifth bay has a 12-over-8 similar to those on the building's east facade midway along the height of the taller windows, with a simulated oculus closer to the roofline, marked by a cast stone cornice.

At the corner the wing has a blind diagonal facet, with engaged brick piers dividing them from the side elevations. An entrance with metal double doors is located. In between the corners are four evenly spaced single and double windows on both stories, set with the lower hopper windows seen elsewhere on the building. The third story has another simulated oculus similar to the other ones.

==== Interior ====
Behind the three main entrance doorways is an interior vestibule. It has polished concrete floors, simulated stone walls and Art Deco piers. Three more doors, wooden with glass panels topped by five-light transoms, open into the main lobby.

The concrete floors and simulated stone walls continue into the lobby. They are complemented by Art Deco pilasters rising to a coffered ceiling. Elaborate surrounds with cast stone entablatures frame the doorways to the two former main administrative offices off the lobby.

On the second and third stories 10-foot-wide (3.0 m) corridors run through the center. They are surfaced in tile, walled in concrete and drywall over terra cotta walls, and have modern acoustic tile ceilings. A few alcoves remain from where display cases were set into the walls.

The former library occupies the east side of the second and third stories. The monumental windows on that face of the main block provide abundant natural light. Entrance is through the wood and glass doors, set in decorative wooden surrounds, along both walls. Casement windows in the third floor let in additional light from within. A cast iron spiral staircase provides access to the mezzanine, which has an iron railing, tiled floor and painted walls and ceilings.

Upstairs, a single open space was later partitioned into classrooms. They all have gypsum walls and modern dropped ceilings. All rooms have solid metal doors; some have closets with wood and glass doors. Metal staircases on either end of the section provide access to the roof.

Within the block are two sets of staircases connecting the basement to the third floor. They are primarily metal, but with an additional wooden handrail. An elevator is also located on the south side.

The corridors continue into both wings, where classrooms have been converted into apartments in various configurations. Both end pavilions contain gymnasiums with an acoustic ceiling, bleachers and a mezzanine level. Near them are locker rooms and staircases similar to those found in the central section. The basement of the north wing also has steam tunnels.

A boiler room is located in the basement of the auditorium wing. The auditorium itself has seats on the first floor with a stage at the west end; a balcony level is located at the east end, with access from the second floor. The walls are of plaster covering terra-cotta brick laid in running bond, with salt glaze on the window trimmings. Art Deco pilasters frame the stage and windows. Stairs similar to those elsewhere in the building are located backstage.

== History ==
The school was built in response to increasing demands on the educational system, and changes in educational theory. During the 77 years it was open, it went from being a junior high school to a magnet school.

=== 1796–1928: Public education in Albany ===
Albany established its public school system in 1796, shortly after American independence. In 1832 it built it first school building. Over the next century the state expanded the funding options available for local schools if they expanded their offerings in turn, such as providing secondary education. By the 1920s Albany's school district operated 25 elementary schools and its high school.

Since the beginning of the 20th century, education professionals had been advocating for an intermediate level of schooling between the elementary schools, which focused on teaching basic skills to children, and the high schools of the time, where curricula centered around specific subjects with the intent of preparing students for careers or higher education. A significant number of high school freshmen, unprepared for the change in emphasis, left school and sought work instead. With high immigration to the cities at the time, the unskilled workforce was already growing steadily. School administrators and elected officials were receptive to any proposal that would keep more of these students in school until graduation.

The new junior high school model put students in grades seven through nine in a separate building, where they could be adjusted to the academic rigor expected of them at the high school level more slowly. Elsewhere in New York, Rochester became the first city to establish a junior high school in 1915. A year later the state's Education Department began encouraging other municipalities to start their own.

Albany established its first junior high schools in 1922, using space in its existing buildings. William Hackett, elected mayor that year, committed $1.5 million of the city's money to build its first junior high school. The school, designed by prominent local architect Marcus T. Reynolds and named after Hackett, opened its Delaware Avenue campus to 600 students in 1927.

Almost immediately it was evident that another such school would be needed. Two years later, the city council passed an ordinance authorizing the city to acquire land in the north of the city. By the end of 1929, a million-dollar loan had been secured, (Note: The city inadvertently benefited from the timing of this loan right before the Depression started, as the first repayments were not due for several years, by which time the economic hardships the Depression brought had eased somewhat) and very soon thereafter the city bought four parcels of land near the Arbor Hill neighborhood, combining them into a single lot where the present school building stands.

At that time, Arbor Hill was growing. Albany, like other Northern cities, was experiencing the Great Migration of African Americans leaving the South in search of jobs in manufacturing and the other industries that sprung up around it. Most of those new arrivals, like previous migrants to Albany, settled first in the South End. Those who prospered and could afford to do so had begun to settle in Arbor Hill.

=== 1929–32: Design and construction ===
Andrew Delehanty was commissioned to design the school. The son of an Irish-born mason, he had taught himself architecture and designed several other schools for the city, as well as a church and firehouse. His plan called for an 800-foot-long (240 m) building in a "Georgian" architectural style. What was at the time referred to as Arbor Hill Junior High School was expected to cost a million dollars and be "one of the most modern equipped and furnished schools in the state," according to the Albany Times Union. The original plans also called for a roof garden, but it was never built.

At the outset of construction the school district hoped to have the building completed in time for the 1930 school year. That estimate was pushed back a year when closing the land acquisitions took longer than expected, meaning grading and other site preparation was delayed. These delays in turn led to difficulties with the labor unions representing workers on the job, anxious with the onset of the Great Depression. By January 1931 only the foundation was complete.

Three months later workers found the body of a 10-year-old boy while draining a pond at the site, highlighting some safety concerns the unions had raised. But later that year the pace of work finally picked up. By fall the school superintendent and mayor both announced that the school would be open for the next school year, even as the district began planning a third junior high in the western neighborhoods of the city. Differing patterns of brickwork in the interior reflect one of the project's goals, to train apprentices in the building trades.

=== 1932–46: School and community center ===
In September 1932 the school opened, now named for Philip Livingston, an Albany native who had signed the Declaration of Independence. Mayor John Boyd Thacher II proudly noted that despite its delayed opening, its enrollment was more than double Hackett's yet it had cost less to build. Its amenities included a thousand-seat auditorium, gymnasium, swimming pool and conservatory. "It would be difficult to find anywhere a building more satisfactorily planned and built, and more efficiently equipped," the school superintendent wrote in the district's annual report. The school cafeteria's kitchen prepared food not just for its own students but for other schools in the city; for its entire lifetime it remained the main office of the district's food-services department.

Philip Livingston soon became one of the city's distinctive buildings, despite its location away from downtown. "Because of its great size, impressive appearance and splendid location," a 1936 guidebook to the Albany schools said, "it is considered Albany's outstanding school building ... It is the embodiment of the ideals of beauty and utility."

The building did more than just educate students through early adolescence. Until the city canceled the program at Philip Livingston in 1938 due to declining enrollment, it hosted night school classes as well. Arbor Hill residents came to the school to cast their votes in election.

Cultural activities were also held in the auditorium. The recently established Albany Symphony Orchestra, then known as the People's Symphony of Albany, rehearsed there and sometimes performed concerts. In 1934, its founder John Carabella, premiered his original work The Helderbergs, "a symphonic poem dedicated to the citizens of Albany", at Philip Livingston.

Other notable people of the era made appearances at the building. Amelia Earhart spoke at the school at the end of 1935 just after she became the first person to fly solo over the Pacific Ocean from Hawaii to California. The next year, dancer and choreographer Ted Shawn brought his Men Dancers to the auditorium's stage as part of his effort to show that ballet could be for men, too, an effort that culminated in the establishment of the annual Jacob's Pillow dance festival in nearby Western Massachusetts.

=== 1947: Paul Robeson controversy ===
In May 1947 the school board granted permission for a concert by Paul Robeson in the auditorium that was primarily to consist of traditional African American spirituals. However, they were overridden by Erastus Corning 2nd, then five years into his four-decade run as Albany mayor. Corning justified the decision by saying Robeson, who he called "one of a group invariably found supporting the Communist Party and its front organizations", often sang Communist songs at his concerts. However, he said he had no objection if the organizers chose to hold the concert in a private venue instead, as he did not believe school buildings should be used for "controversial affairs."

Corning was attacked as a racist, not only in Albany but by telegrams and letters that his office received from all over the country. The Civil Rights Congress of Albany called it "a flagrant violation of our civil liberties" and retained a local lawyer, Arthur Harvey, to file suit. He argued before state Supreme Court Justice Isadore Bookstein that the agreement between the board and the church cultural organization that sponsored the concert was a contract, rather than a permit, that the city could not so easily revoke. Harvey characterized Corning's action as "a slur on the Negro people as a whole." On the other side, veterans' organizations held pickets outside City Hall, urging citizens to boycott the performance as a patriotic duty.

Bookstein soon ruled on the case. He issued an injunction requiring the city to let Robeson perform, but only as long as he sang and did not give any speeches. When the concert was held, Corning had city police standing by to stop the performance if Robeson began making a speech. But they did not interrupt—before a capacity crowd, Robeson performed to great acclaim, although he did include on the program two songs sung during the Spanish Civil War.

=== 1948–1969: Expansion ===
The school continued in its role as a community and cultural center throughout the postwar years. Despite its access to larger and better space, the orchestra continued to give concerts there as late as the mid-1950s. For years, a local church raised money through performances of its gospel choir. A performance of The Mikado was staged there in 1958, and touring glee clubs and a cappella groups found the Philip Livingston auditorium an ideal venue.

In 1967 came the most significant alteration to the building. Architect William Gleason designed a one-story cafeteria wing (no longer extant) that projected from the back of the building. It was of more modern design, and thus considered a non-contributing portion of the building when it was later listed on the National Register.

Two years later the school was again the focus of a race-related controversy in the city. A hundred protesters against racial discrimination in the school system were arrested in the building. With tensions high in the wake of the incident, the city closed all its schools for two days afterwards.

=== 1970–2009: Magnet school era, decline and closure ===
In response to the protesters' concerns, the school district applied for grants from the Magnet Schools Assistance Program, established by the federal government under the Elementary and Secondary Education Act of 1965. The intent was to remake the school as a magnet school and thus ease racial segregation. By the early 1970s this had been done and the school was officially renamed Philip Livingston Magnet Academy.

However, over the last quarter of the 20th century the school itself began to decline. The building began showing signs of aging, at the same time as financial shortfalls led to maintenance being deferred. Within it, educational achievement began to decline as disciplinary problems rose. By the end of the century it was on the state's Persistently Dangerous Schools list. Pressure from parents in Arbor Hill led to the establishment of private charter schools in the area, and enrollment at Philip Livingston began to fall as that option became available to parents.

Under new leadership in the late 1990s, the school began to reverse those trends. By the late 2000s, it had been taken off the dangerous schools list, and student test scores were increasing again. However, the building's physical plant continued to deteriorate.

In 2005 the district diverted $19 million meant for maintenance to Philip Livingston to other schools instead. Two years later the superintendent proposed remodeling the building into a high school dedicated to engineering, nanotechnology and environmental science, but the school board rejected the idea. Parents, believing that the district was unwilling to make the necessary investments in the aging school, increasingly chose to send their children to the new charter schools in the Arbor Hill neighborhood.

By that time, the school was down to 250 students, well below the amount it had been designed for. Enrollment increased slightly the next year, as did test scores, but not to the level where the school board felt it could justify keeping it open any longer. In 2009 the school graduated its last class of eighth graders, and closed permanently.

=== 2010–present: Adaptation to senior housing ===
Assuming that students whose parents had chosen the charter schools would never return, the district put the building up for sale. In 2011 a Long Island-based developer bought it for $3.5 million, with the intention of converting it into senior housing. The National Register listing was intended in part to make the property eligible for additional grants that could make the rehabilitation financially viable.

Support for the sale among the school board members was not unanimous. "I'm concerned that we're getting rid of a building we had for a long time, we had big plans for that building," said one, Melissa Mackey. "We still have space concerns," she added, noting that the district's remaining middle schools were almost at capacity.

Renovations were completed and the apartments opened in 2013; the 1967 cafeteria wing was removed during that time to provide more parking. Two years later, other members of the city school board came to share Mackey's regrets. By 2015, some of the charter schools had closed, leaving many students with no other option but to return to Albany's public schools. In elections that year, voters rejected the district's plans for a new high school. Shortly afterward, the district learned it needed more middle school space.

The board hoped to be able to obtain space for a fourth middle school on the north side of the city by 2018. One member, Rose Brandon, lamented that Livingston could no longer be reused. "We had a beautiful one there," she said at a meeting. "Prior boards and superintendents decided to close that school ... Now it appears we need a school on exactly that side of the city." While the decision was irreversible by that time, she still called it "a serious injustice."

== See also ==
- Architecture of Albany, New York
- East Irvington School, another Register-listed former school in New York converted into apartments
- History of Albany, New York (1900–1942)
- History of Albany, New York (1942–1983)
- History of Albany, New York (1983–present)
- National Register of Historic Places listings in Albany, New York
