= Tivoli Nature Preserve =

Urban nature preserve in Capital District

- Interactive map of Tivoli Nature Preserve
- Type: Urban wildlife preserve
- Location: Albany, New York
- Coordinates: 42.6706°N 73.7612°W
- Area: 82 acres (33 ha)
- Created: 1957
- Operator: City of Albany

The Tivoli Nature Preserve, also Tivoli Park, in Albany is the largest urban nature preserve in the Capital District.

== History ==
The land now comprising the Tivoli Preserve was originally owned by the Van Rensselaer family as part of the patroonship of Rensselaerswyck. In 1844 the Tivoli Hollow Railroad was built from Fuller Road to the Albany Lumber District through the Tivoli Hollow and the northern end of the future park. In 1850 the city of Albany purchased the land in order to dam the Patroon Creek to form a reservoir for the public water system. In 1851 dams were constructed across Patroon Creek forming Upper and Lower Tivoli lakes, the upper lake was for storing and the lower for distribution. The lakes served the population of the city east of North Pearl Street.

Plans to extend Manning Boulevard from its then current terminus at the intersection of Clinton Avenue and Central Avenue through the waterworks property were proposed in the 1870s and though grading and preliminary work proceeded, the street laid out was never a grand boulevard as proposed and the portion inside the park was never completed. Due to neglect after being abandoned as a water source around the turn of the 20th century, the park became the site of an informal dumping ground in the 1920s and the lake became heavily polluted to the point where it allegedly was red with pollution from nearby slaughterhouses. In 1957 the city turned the waterworks property into the Tivoli Lakes Nature Study Sanctuary, though by 1974 the area was in such neglect again that the Albany Times Union published a faux obituary describing the park's "death". As part of a 1998 settlement closing the waste incinerator in the Sheridan Hollow neighborhood, the state funded a clean-up and upgrade of the preserve into an educational center in conjunction with the neighboring Philip Livingston Middle School.

Proposed in 2002 the Patroon Path will be a 10-foot (3.0 m) wide path from the Corning Preserve at the Hudson River west through the preserve along the Patroon Creek and Interstate 90 (I-90) to Rensselaer Lake and the Pine Bush Preserve.

== Activities ==
Fish in Tivoli Lake include bluegill, large mouth bass, and pumpkinseed; birds in the preserve include woodpeckers, turkeys, red-winged blackbirds, and red tailed hawks. Mammals include squirrels, deer, and opossums. Nature walks and birdwatching is a popular activity in the preserve.

Behind the Livingston Village Apartments is a 70 plot community garden within the Tivoli Preserve. It is Albany's largest community garden.
