= Patroon Creek =

Patroon Creek Bloomaerts Kill, Fifth Kill, Mill Creek, Patroon's Creek
- Patroon Creek watershed
- Etymology: the patroon of Rensselaerswyck

Location
- Country: United States
- State: New York
- Municipality: City of Albany

Physical characteristics
- Source: Rensselaer Lake
  - location: Albany, New York, United States
  - coordinates: 42°41′52″N 73°50′0″W
  - elevation: 249 ft (76 m)
- Mouth: Hudson River
  - location: Albany, New York, United States
  - coordinates: 42°39′34″N 73°44′15″W
  - elevation: 0 ft (0 m)
- Length: 6.2 mi (10.0 km)
- Basin size: 13.1 sq mi (34 km^{2})
- Discharge
  - location: Northern Boulevard Viaduct Latitude 42°40'17"; Longitude 73°45'22"
  - average: 30.6 cu ft/s (0.87 m^{3}/s)
  - minimum: 9.81 cu ft/s (0.278 m^{3}/s)
  - maximum: 619 cu ft/s (17.5 m^{3}/s)

Basin features
- River system: Hudson River Watershed
- Tributaries
  - left: Sand Creek

Patroon Creek is a stream in Albany County, New York, United States and is a tributary of the Hudson River which flows south to New York Harbor and the Atlantic Ocean. The creek's source is Rensselaer Lake in the western section of the city of Albany. Patroon Creek received its name from the patroon of Rensselaerswyck.

== History ==
Patroon Creek, starting with Henry Hudson's discovery of the Hudson River, was a part of the Dutch colony New Netherland and the patroonship of Rensselaerswyck, founded in 1630. On the 1632 Map of Rensselaerswyck the mouth of the Patroon Creek is labeled as "Bloommaert's Burt", and Patroon Creek gained the name of Bloomaert's Kill, kill being the Dutch word for creek or stream. Another early name for the kill was Fifth Kill, it being the fifth (and final) kill (counting from the south) in the colonial Albany area. Early settlers in the 17th century included Gerrit Thensz de Reux who settled a farm on the Blommaerts Kill in 1632, and Rutger Jacobsz in 1645 and Adrian Hybertsz in 1647 who settled just north of the kill. In 1654 Jacob Jansz Flodder was the highest bidder for establishing grist and sawmills on the kill and Barent Pietersz Koeymans and Teunis Cornelisz van Spitsbergen obtained a lease for a sawmill higher up the kill. In 1666 Jeremias van Rensselaer, the fourth patroon, established several barns and mills along the kill on what is now Tivoli Street. The Old Manor House was also built by the patroon just north of the creek near its mouth with the Hudson in 1666.

In 1844 the railroad between Albany and Schenectady east of Fuller Road was moved north from the central part of the city to the Tivoli Hollow Line which ran across the northern border of the city along Patroon Creek and through West Albany. The Albany and Schenectady Railroad which owned this line was merged with nine other railroads as the New York Central Railroad (NYCRR) in 1853, and work soon began on the establishment of a large rail yard, on 250 acres (1.0 km^{2}) purchased in 1854 in West Albany.

In 1845 the Albany Waterworks Company purchased from the patroon Stephen van Rensselaer a portion of the Patroon Creek for use as a water supply. The Albany Waterworks was a private corporation and was replaced by a municipal water supply in 1850 which then purchased all the water sources from the Albany Waterworks. In 1851 the Patroon Creek was dammed by the city roughly 6 miles (9.7 km) from Albany City Hall where three streams met to form the creek. The lake formed was named Rensselaer Lake in honor of Stephen van Rensselaer. Water from the lake passed through a 4-foot (1.2 m) tall and 4-mile (6.4 km) long brick pipe to the Bleecker Reservoir (now Bleecker Stadium) where the water was used for the portion of the city west from Pearl Street to Lark Street. Also in 1851 dams were thrown across the lower portion of Patroon Creek to form the Lower and Upper Tivoli Lakes (upper for storage, lower for distribution), the water being from the tributaries that join the Patroon east of the Rensselaer Lake dam. Other reservoirs would be constructed on the creek and its tributaries, the Patroon Creek Reservoir at Russell Road and another north of there on the Sand Creek also next to Russell Road. The Tivoli Lakes supplied water to that portion of the city east from Pearl Street. In 1875, the Hudson River began to be used as the primary source of water, with the various reservoirs on the Patroon Creek as back-up. The Tivoli Lakes reservoirs were abandoned in 1910. The NYCRR West Albany Rail Yard then became the sole user of the lower portion of Patroon Creek and its tributary the Sand Creek, mostly the water was used for industrial purposes. Rensselaer Lake was used as a water supply until 1926.

From the 1950s to 1998 Mercury Refining Company had a plant along an unnamed tributary to the Patroon Creek. Since 1983 the site has been on the Superfund pollution clean-up list. Several former customers of the plant including National Grid, Eveready, and Union Carbide put up over $4 million for the clean-up being supervised by the Environmental Protection Agency (EPA). Another industrial site that has polluted the Patroon Creek and its watershed is a factory owned by NL Industries (formerly National Lead). The factory recycled depleted uranium into armor-piercing shot and shell. The factory was closed in 1983 after it was found that its six smokestacks were contaminating the suburban neighborhood of Roessleville with uranium dust. As late as 2003 uranium was found in sediments by the US Army Corps of Engineers at many locations along the creek, most of those locations the level was below their cleanup criteria, but two locations within the creek near the NL site contained uranium concentrations above the criteria. Mercury has also been found in the creek downstream from the Superfund site and is being investigated by local college professors.

Prior to the establishment of Albany's modern sewer system with treatment plants in the 1970s the municipality routinely had sewer pipes outflow into the creeks around the city. In 2000 several office buildings around Everett Road were found to still be dumping into the Patroon Creek and the pipes were corked and the properties connected to the municipal sewer system.

In the 1970s the Patroon Creek was diverted around Tivoli Lake and the lake was dredged. In 2010 plans have begun to return the creek through the lake in order to increase the oxygen content and circulation of the lake, along with using the wetlands of the lake as a natural filter to clean the Patroon Creek. This plan has been opposed by groups representing the area around Tivoli Lake who fear that heavy metals such as mercury and depleted uranium will be deposited in the lake and preserve.

In 1993 the creek was declared one of the state's ten worst polluted streams, with no significant living thing found except tube worms. By 1997 the creek had begun to improve, with minnows and crawfish, and in 1998 mayfly were found which indicated better quality water. In 2001 Mayor Jerry Jennings and Governor George Pataki announced a proposed 8-mile (13 km) multi-use path between the Corning Preserve and the Albany Pine Bush by way of the Tivoli Nature Preserve along the Patroon Creek.

== Geography ==
The Patroon Creek is 6.2 miles (10.0 km) long from a grate at the eastern end of Rensselaer Lake to a culvert that empties into the Hudson River. About 1/3 of the creek has been moved from its original course and/or buried in culverts since the 19th century to make way for railroads and highways. The creek passes through three nature preserves, the Albany Pine Bush at its source, the Tivoli Park Preserve, and the Corning Preserve at its mouth. The creek's watershed is roughly 5,000 acres (2,000 ha). The watershed is in an urban environment with a population density of 2,550 inhabitants/mi^{2} (965 inhabitants/km^{2}), and approximately 17% of the watershed is forested. The Sand Creek, which resides mostly in Colonie, is a major tributary with a watershed of 3 square miles (7.8 km^{2}).

== See also ==
- List of rivers of New York
