= Philip Livingston (disambiguation) =

Philip Livingston (1716–1778) was an American merchant and statesman, and a signer of the Declaration of Independence.

Philip Livingston may also refer to:

- Philip Livingston (1686–1749), New York City landowner
- Philip Livingston (RAF officer) (1893−1982), Canadian Royal Air Force officer
- Philip Livingston Magnet Academy, a former school in Albany, New York
