= Tivoli Hollow Railroad =

Map

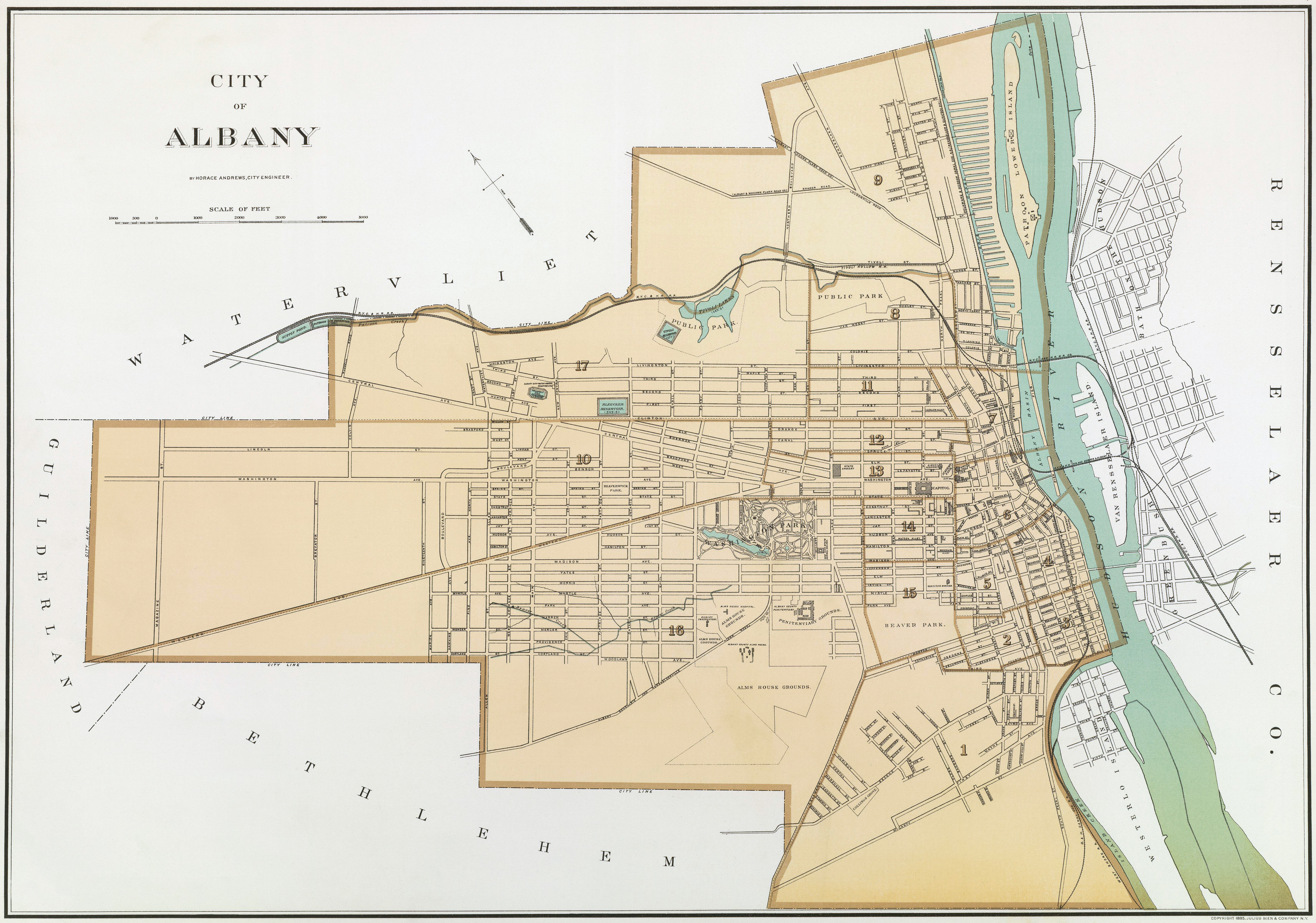
1895 map of Albany, New York, which includes the Tivoli Hollow Railroad

The Tivoli Hollow Railroad was chartered in 1893. It was completed 1.23 miles (1.98 km) in the Tivoli Hollow section of the City of Albany, New York prior to 1903 (exact date not known). It was merged into New York Central and Hudson River Railroad in 1913.

== See also ==
- Tivoli Nature Preserve
