= Rensselaer Lake =

Lake in Albany, New York, U.S.

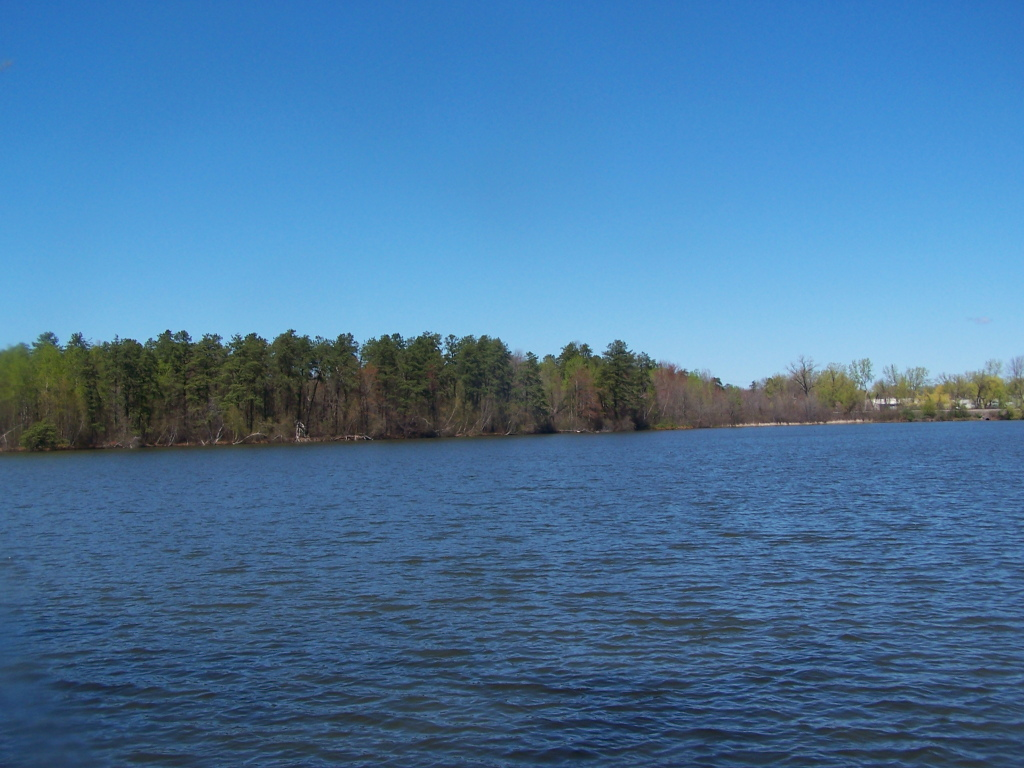
- View across the lake from southeast

- Location within New York
- Location: Albany, New York
- Coordinates: 42°41′51″N 73°49′57″W
- Type: artificial
- Primary outflows: Patroon Creek
- Basin countries: United States
- Managing agency: City of Albany
- Built: 1851
- Surface area: 35.3 acres (14.3 ha)
- Average depth: 11 ft (3.4 m)
- Max. depth: 23 ft (7.0 m)
- Water volume: 16 million gal (610,000 m^{3})
- Shore length^{1}: 2.6 mi (4.2 km)
- Surface elevation: 269 ft (82 m)
- ^{1} Shore length is not a well-defined measure.

Rensselaer Lake is an artificial lake in Albany, New York, United States named for Major-General Stephen Van Rensselaer, last patroon of Rensselaerswyck. The lake was Albany's first municipally owned source of water. It is part of a 57-acre (23 ha) park and the state's Albany Pine Bush Preserve. The lake and park have been under the purview of the Albany Water Authority since 2003.

== History ==
Rensselaer Lake is at the headwaters of the Patroon Creek in the western section of the city of Albany. Once the location of several feeder streams that formed the creek, the land was purchased by the city in 1850 and dammed in 1851 as the city's first municipal source of water. The dam was located roughly six miles (9.7 km) from Albany City Hall, lending the lake its original name of the Six Mile Waterworks. Prior to this, the city was served by a private company, the Albany Waterworks Company. The lake fed water to the Bleecker Reservoir where it was used by portions of the city west of Pearl Street to the area around Lark Street. The lake was used as a water supply until 1926, and became a city park under Mayor Erastus Corning II in 1956.

In the late 1990s the Six Mile Waterworks was restored after decades of disrepair. The city partnered with the Albany Pine Bush Preserve Commission, area schools, businesses, youth organizations and individual sponsors to build new docks, a boardwalk, and a nature trail. An open-air interpretive center is planned.

In 2003, the Albany Water Authority paid the city of Albany $7 million for a 50-year lease of the Six Mile Waterworks and Rensselaer Lake for use as an emergency backup water supply. This included the entire 206-acre (83 ha) city park and helped balance the city's budgets for 2002, 2003, and 2004. This sale was criticized as being a fiscal trick, shifting some of the tax burden from residents' property tax bills to their water bills. City property taxes increased that year 7.4 percent, and the water authority also tacked on a 9.5 percent rate increase.

== Geography ==
Rensselaer Lake is located in the western section of the city of Albany, with a portion stretching into the neighboring town of Guilderland. It is the namesake and central feature of the Albany Pine Bush Rensselaer Lake Preserve and Park, also known as the Six Mile Waterworks. It is a part of the Albany Pine Bush Preserve.

The Adirondack Northway (I-87) is carried over a narrow channel of the lake by a bridge just north of Exit 1. The channel connects the main eastern basin to a shallower western basin which has a depth of 15 feet (4.6 m). Exit 1 and Interstate 90 (I-90) are directly south of the lake and preserve. To the north of the lake and preserve is the town of Guilderland and CSXT railroad tracks. West of the lake is Rapp Road; to the east is Fuller Road and Exit 2 of I-90. The Patroon Creek flows east from the lake towards the Hudson River.

The western section of the lake has two forks fed by inlet streams; the northern fork by groundwater, and the southern fork by a 1,150-foot (350 m) stream created by two drainage culverts and groundwater seepage. The two forks merge 2,300 feet (700 m) past the southern inlet stream. The lake has a surface area of 35.3 acres (14.3 ha). It has a mean depth of 11 feet (3.4 m) with a maximum depth of over 20 feet (6.1 m).

== Recreation ==
Rensselaer Lake and the park surrounding it allow fishing, boating, hiking, and picnicking; there is also a playground. The lake is stocked several times a year from the city's current source of water, the Alcove Reservoir. A nature viewing platform allows visitors to view wildlife along a wetland on the lake without disturbing the environment. Two large docks allow for access to the lake by boat.

== See also ==
- List of lakes in New York
- Geography of Albany, New York
