= Statue of Philip Schuyler =

1925 statue by J. Massey Rhind outside Albany City Hall

- Major General Philip Schuyler
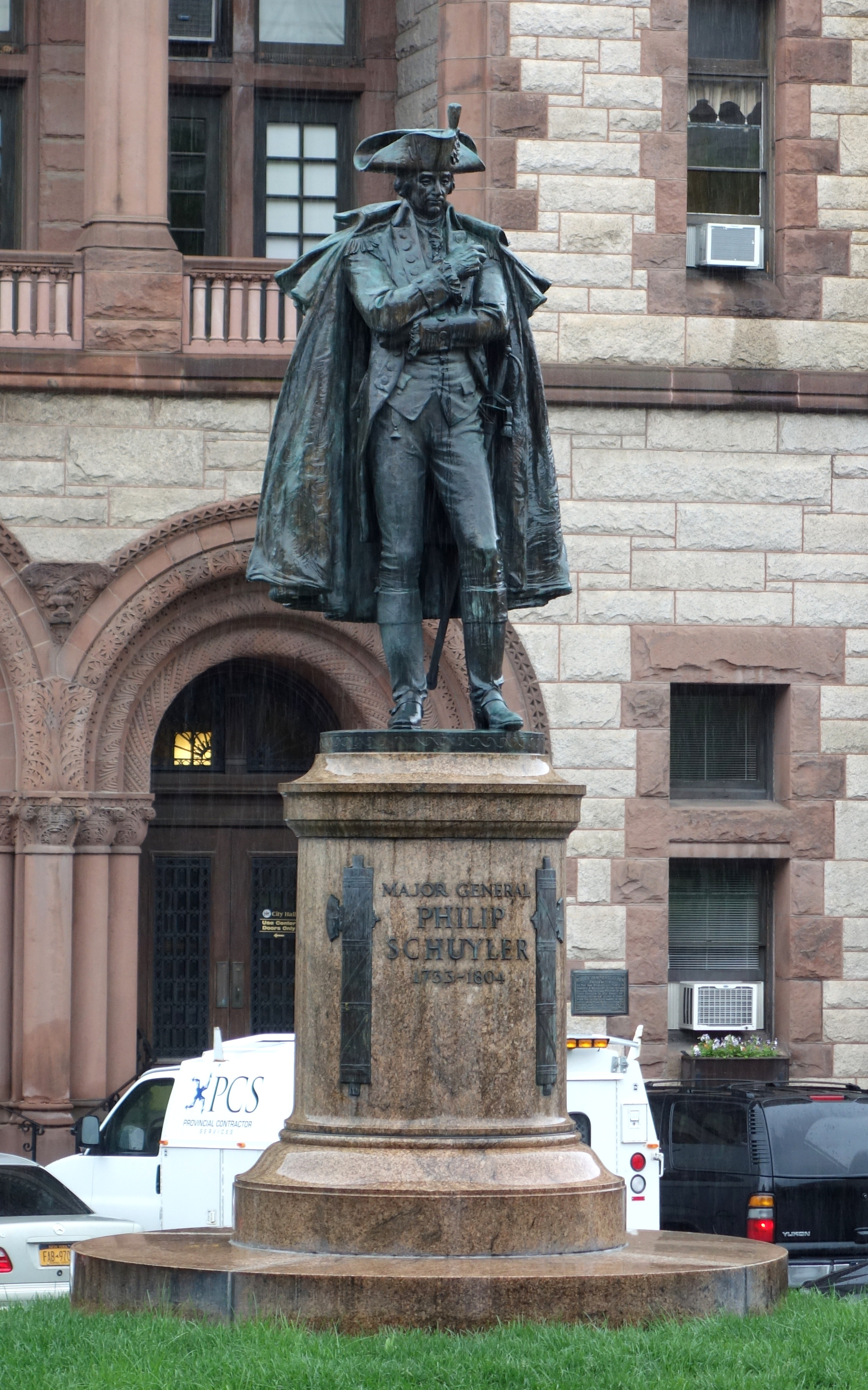
- The monument in 2013
- Artist: J. Massey Rhind
- Year: 1925
- Medium: Bronze sculpture; marble (base)
- Subject: Philip Schuyler
- Location: Albany, New York, U.S.; 42°39′7.19″N 73°45′17.63″W

A statue of Philip Schuyler (sometimes called Major General Philip Schuyler) by J. Massey Rhind was installed outside Albany City Hall in Albany, New York, United States. The memorial was slated for removal in June 2020. It was removed from outside Albany City Hall on June 10, 2023.

== Description ==
The bronze sculpture of Philip Schuyler is approximately 114 inches tall and has a diameter of 65 inches. Schuyler wears a military uniform, including a cape and hat, and has his arms folded in front. The statue rests on a marble base, which is approximately 87 in (220 cm) tall and has a diameter of 115 in (290 cm). An inscription on a plaque reads:

PRESENTED IN LOVING MEMORY OF / HIS WIFE THEODORA M. HAWLEY TO THE / CITY OF ALBANY, BY GEORGE C. HAWLEY / MCMXXV / CITIZENS' COMMITTEE / HON. WM. S. HACKETT, MAYOR FRANK B. GRAVES / HON. WM. E. WOOLLARD DR. ARTHUR W. ELTING

== History ==
Dedicated on June 14, 1925, the monument was donated by George C. Hawley to commemorate his wife, Theodora M. Hawley.

The artwork was surveyed by the Smithsonian Institution's "Save Outdoor Sculpture!" program in 1992.

In June 2020, Mayor Kathy Sheehan said that it needed to be taken down because he was the city's biggest enslaver when he lived in Albany. "The removal of the Philip Schuyler statue does not reform systems or eliminate the racism institutionalized in these systems locally and nationally," Chief City Auditor Dorcey Applyrs said in the Thursday statement. "However, it symbolically demonstrates an acknowledgement that slavery was wrong. The removal of this statue also acknowledges the horrific and negative implications of slavery and its impact on the lives of Black Americans in the City of Albany every day."

== See also ==
- List of monuments and memorials removed during the George Floyd protests
