= West Albany, New York =

- Hamlet
- Location within New York Location within the United States
- Coordinates: 42°41′10″N 73°47′05″W
- Country: United States
- State: New York
- Region: Capital District
- County: Albany
- Settled: 1850s
- Named for: Being west of the city of Albany
- Time zone: UTC−5 (EST)
  - Summer (DST): UTC−4 (EDT)
- ZIP Code: 12205 (Albany)
- Area code: 518

West Albany is a hamlet in the town of Colonie, Albany County, New York, United States. Parts of the neighboring city of Albany around Watervliet Avenue Extension and Industrial Park Road are also considered part of West Albany and include the majority of the West Albany Rail Yard. The hamlet lies along Albany's northern border and was once home to many industries, including one of the largest cattle stockyards in the United States, a large railroad switching yard, and a Tobin First Prize packing plant. Those industries are gone now and the community is mostly a residential suburb of Albany in the shadow of abandoned industrial complexes. West Albany has historically been ethnically diverse with Polish, Italian, Irish, German, and English immigrants drawn by the 5,000+ jobs at the West Albany Rail Yard. Though the neighborhood is predominately Italian-American, it remains diverse with the Polish American Citizens Club, the West Albany Italian Benevolent Society, the Bet Shraga Hebrew Academy, and a Korean worship center in the former St. Francis de Sales Catholic Church.

== History ==
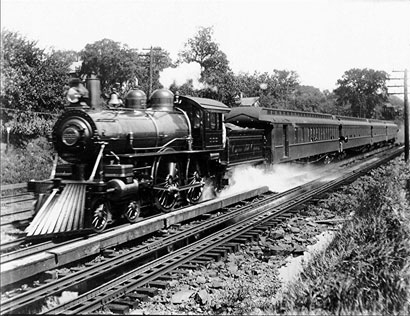
Engine 999 as it leads the Empire State Express through Palatine, New York in 1905.

Andrew R. Hunter purchased in the 1850s extensive holdings in what would become West Albany, improving and surveying lots that he would then subsequently sell to homesteaders. He is credited with making West Albany.

Though Hunter is credited with settling West Albany, it is to industry that credit must be given for making West Albany a name in the world. The cattle stockyards were moved here from Albany in 1860 and quickly rose to national importance, ranking just behind Chicago and Buffalo at the end of the 1880s, and occasionally even surpassing them in business transacted. Growth in the hamlet accelerated due to the presence of the railroads, stockyards, meat packing and related industries. A post office was established in 1862, and in 1865 the horse railway (an early form of mass transit) was extended up Central Ave from downtown Albany to West Albany.

The location of the cattle yards and the subsequent development of West Albany would not have been possible without the railroads. In 1844, the railroad between Albany and Schenectady east of Fuller Road was moved north from the central part of the city to the Tivoli Hollow Line, which ran across the northern border of the city along Patroon Creek and through West Albany. The Albany & Schenectady Railroad, which owned this line, was merged with nine other railroads as the New York Central Railroad (NYC) in 1853; and work soon began on the establishment of a large rail yard, on 250 acres (1.0 km^{2}) purchased in 1854 in West Albany. It would later be expanded to include another 100 acres (0.40 km^{2}). The NYCRR shops at the West Albany Yard employed over 6,000 people at its height at the turn of the 20th century. In 1893, those shops built Engine 999 as a special publicity project in order to win an international competition to build the world's fastest steam locomotive. Engine #999 won at 102.8 miles per hour, the first time the 100 mile/hour mark was reached by a locomotive. Today, the engine is on display at the Museum of Science and Industry in Chicago. About the same time as Engine 999 was being built, locomotive construction was starting to be outsourced to the American Locomotive Company (ALCO) in nearby Schenectady, and the last steam engine to be repaired at the West Albany Shops would be in 1952, with the train car repair shops closing in 1954. The site was sold in 1955, equipment auctioned in 1956, and the majority of the buildings were demolished in 1964. The West Albany Industrial Park in the city of Albany occupies most of the site today, and there remains a small freight car operation. The main track continues to be used by freight and Amtrak passenger trains.

West Albany sat at the center of a railroad crossroads where the road west from New England met the road coming north from New York City for traffic to travel west. This became a sore bottleneck for the NYC due to the West Albany Hill being the steepest grade between the East Coast and Chicago. By 1922, the large grade and other inadequacies of the West Albany Yard, along with issues concerning the low drawbridges across the Hudson River leading to it, led to the building of the Castleton Cutoff, including the Alfred H. Smith Memorial Bridge and the Selkirk Yard. Trains could now bypass the entire city of Albany.

The slaughterhouse roots of West Albany continued into the later half of the 20th century, decades after the railroad abandoned the hamlet, thanks to the Tobin Packing Company. In 1924, the Albany Packing Company was incorporated, and it would later merge with the Rochester Packing Company to form the Tobin Packing Company. Tobin's First Prize continues to be one of the most top-selling brands in the Northeastern U.S., and especially Albany, according to the current owner of the brand, John Morrell and Company. The plant, also referred to as Tobin's First Prize Center, was according to former employees so busy it pumped out 50,000 hot dogs, 700 hams, and 20,000 pounds of kielbasa a day; and every hour roughly 360 hogs were slaughtered to keep up with this production. When the Tobin meat-packing plant closed in 1981, it employed 600 people. The First Prize Center has seen interest from several different retail development plans, including at one point or another either a Walmart, Kmart (which backed away when it filed for bankruptcy), Home Depot (which decided to build on the other side of Interstate 90 on Central Avenue in Albany), or Lowe's. The site was even considered for a new county nursing home. The Albany County Industrial Development Agency (IDA) has owned the 32-acre (130,000 m^{2}) property since the late 1980s after purchasing it from the US federal government foreclosure sale.

With the loss of the rail yard and Tobin's the community began somewhat of a decline, at least as measured by enrollment in the West Albany Elementary School. In 1984, the school was closed after years of declining enrollment. This school has its origins as the West Albany Union Free School 19 which was established in 1857, and in 1947 the district was consolidated with others in the town of Colonie to form the South Colonie Central School District. The building continues to be used for educational purposes as the home of a Hebrew Academy.

== Geography ==
West Albany is in the southern part of the town of Colonie, along the border with Albany. Like all hamlets in New York, West Albany is very loosely defined geographically. Portions of the hamlet have been annexed to the neighboring city of Albany, but still identify as West Albany. Exchange Street is considered to be main street, though Everett Road (Albany County Route 155) and Sand Creek Road are more important thoroughfares. Recent suburbanization of the former farms and woodlands surrounding West Albany has further blurred the identity of West Albany and eliminated any buffer from neighboring hamlets such as Loudonville and Roessleville.
