= History of Albany, New York (1900–1942) =

The history of Albany, New York from 1900 to 1942 begins at the start of the 20th century and ends with the beginning of the tenure of Erastus Corning 2nd as mayor in 1942.

Albany opened one of the first commercial airports in the world, and the first municipal airport in the United States, in 1908. Originally located on a polo field on Loudon Road, it moved to Westerlo Island in 1909 and remained there until 1928. The Albany Municipal Airport—jointly owned by the city and county—was moved to its current location in Colonie in 1928. In 1960, the mayor sold the city's stake in the airport to the county, citing budget issues. It was known from then on as Albany County Airport until a massive upgrade and modernization project between 1996 and 1998, when it was rechristened Albany International Airport. By 1916, portions of Albany's northern and southern borders had reached their modern courses; Westerlo Island, to the south, became the second-to-last annexation in 1926.

== Overview ==
In 1901 as part of the Arbor Day celebration Dana Park is opened, where Delaware Avenue and Lark Street meet at Madison Avenue. Also in 1901 a strike occurred by the employees of the United Traction Company (UTC), which ran the inter-city and intra-city mass transit buses and trolleys. The strike begins on May 7, and on May 14 the governor sends the 10th Battalion and Third Signal Corps to keep order on the UTC's routes, the next day the 23rd Regiment of Brooklyn is sent as reinforcement and the city is placed under martial law. On May 16 a mob attacks one of the UTC cars on Broadway just north of Columbia Street. The 23rd Regiment opens fire and two are killed, the strike ends on May 19. Later in 1901 the local baseball team wins the State Pennant, they will win again in 1902. In 1902 Charles Gaus (Republican) becomes mayor of Albany after defeating General Amsaa Parker (Democrat) by 2,354 votes in the 1901 election. He is reelected over Colonel William Rice (Democrat) by 4,563 votes in the 1903 election, and in the 1905 election over Dr. William Wansboro by 8,536 votes.

The Albany County Municipal Airport was the first municipal airport and Albany International Airport remains the oldest in the United States. In 1908 the airstrip was located on a former polo field on Loudonville Road, three miles (5 km) north of the city in the town of Colonie. In 1909 the airport was moved to Westerlo Island, which is in the city of Albany, but at that time was in the town of Bethlehem. The airport was named after Teddy Roosevelt's son, Quentin, a fighter pilot during World War I. A $10,000 prize was established for sustained flight between Albany and New York City; Glen Curtiss achieved this feat on May 29, 1910. Other early pioneers of aviation that stopped at this early field were Charles Lindbergh, Amelia Earhart, and James Doolittle.

Mayor John Boyd Thacher II once said "a city without the foresight to build an airport for the new traffic may soon be left behind in the race for competition". He therefore decided to build in 1928 a new modern airport on the Shaker site near Albany-Shaker Road in Colonie, not far from the original polo fields used as the first site of the municipal airport. The Shakers not only sold the land used but also loaned the use of tractors and tools.

Erastus Corning 2nd, Albany's longest-serving mayor and the longest-serving mayor of any American city, was elected in 1941 and began his tenure in 1942.

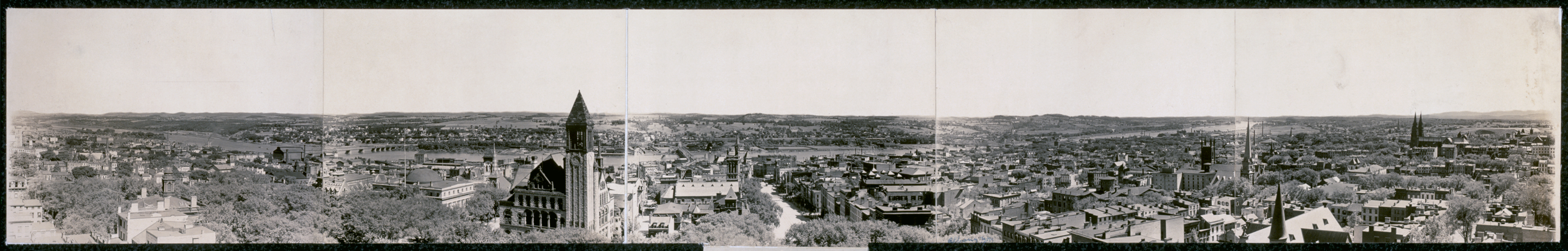
Albany, as viewed from the Capitol looking southeast, circa 1906. City Hall is left of center; the Empire State Plaza is currently located at the extreme right of the image.
