= Tivoli Lake =

Lake in Albany County, New York, USA

- Location within New York Location within the United States
- Location: Albany, New York
- Coordinates: 42°40′14″N 73°45′40″W
- Basin countries: United States
- Surface area: 4 acres (1.6 ha)
- Average depth: 4.6 ft (1.4 m)
- Max. depth: 10 ft (3.0 m)
- Water volume: 36 acre⋅ft (44,000 m^{3})
- Surface elevation: 141 ft (43 m)

Tivoli Lake is a body of water in Albany, New York. It has a surface area of 4 acres (16,000 m^{2}) and a mean depth of 4.6 feet (1.4 m).
