= William Coffee =

American cryptographer and politician (1917–1989)

William Coffee (1917–1989) was an American cryptographer. He received the Commendation for Meritorious Civilian Service in April 1946 for his role in recruiting and leading a group of African-American cryptographers in the United States Army's Signals Intelligence Service. He began his career in public service with the Civilian Conservation Corps from 1937 to 1940. Soon after, he began working for the Signal Intelligence Service, later known as the Signal Security Agency. Despite being hired as a janitor, he was promoted to a messenger. Upon being promoted, he was assigned the task of hiring a group of black cryptologists at Arlington Hall Station. His success in composing and directing this group elevated him to a status previously unreached by black cryptologists. After the Second World War, Coffee joined the Armed Forces Security Agency, which later became the National Security Agency. Coffee retired from the NSA in 1972. He was inducted into the National Security Agency's Cryptologic Hall of Honor in 2011.
