= Jonathan Tenney =

American librarian and educator (1817–1888)

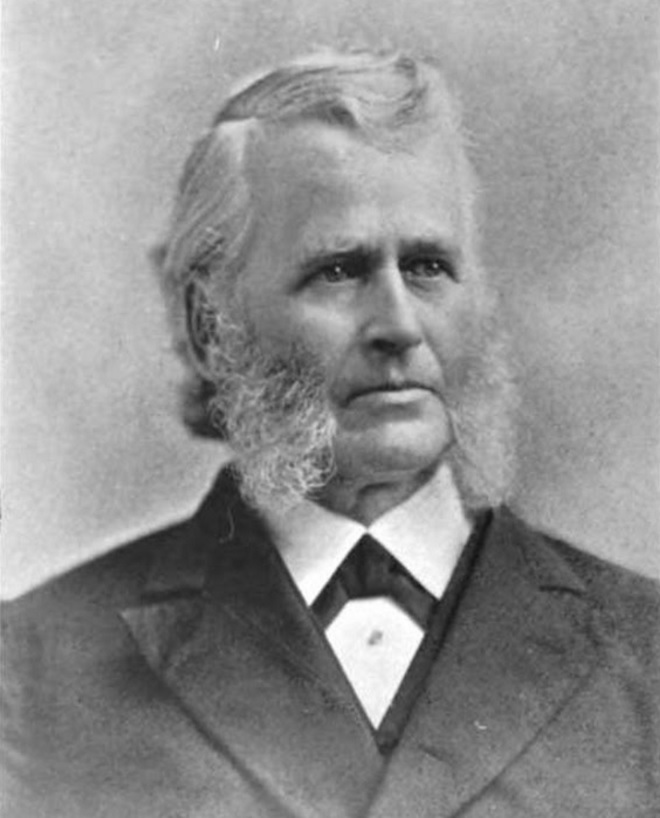
Portrait photograph of Professor Jonathan Tenney

Jonathan Tenney (September 14, 1817 - February 24, 1888), was an educator, librarian, and editor in New Hampshire and New York.

Born in Corinth, Vermont, son of Jonathan and Lydia Owen (Crane), Tenney graduated from Dartmouth College in 1843, and in 1846 received the degree of M.A., and 1880 the degree of Ph.D. from that college. For nine winters previous to his graduation, he was a popular teacher in district and village schools in his native state. After graduating he taught in the academy in Hebron, New Hampshire; resigned and established a high school in Newbury, Vermont; was principal of Pembroke Academy in New Hampshire for five years; resigned and became master of the South Grammar School in Lawrence, Massachusetts; was principal of Pittsfield High School from November 1850 to March 1853; then principal at Manchester, New Hampshire. He resigned to become editor and publisher of the Stars and Stripes, the influence of which resulted in placing the Republican Party in power in the state of New Hampshire. From 1855 to 1857 he was chairman of the school committee, commissioner of schools for Hillsborough County, and secretary of the State Board of Education. He was the originator of the New Hampshire State Teachers' Association in 1854; its president, 1855 and 1856; and after January 1862 the resident editor of the New Hampshire Journal of Education. For nine years he was the principal of Elmwood Institute, and from 1869 to 1874 he was the principal of the Owego Free Academy, New York.

In 1874, having been appointed Deputy Superintendent of Public Instruction for the state of New York, he moved to Albany, and was made librarian of the Young Men's Association. After serving seven years he resigned and entered upon the editorship of New England in Albany and the History of Albany County and City. He was an officer in civil and several political organizations, and corresponding member of the Vermont, Wisconsin, and New Hampshire Historical Societies, and of the New England and New York Genealogical Societies. He wrote and edited the Septenary History of the Dartmouth Class of 1843, the Watch Repairer's Handbook, a Class Memorial of the Dartmouth Class of 1843, the Genealogical and Historical Memoirs of the Tenney Family, History of the Young Men's Association of Albany, and History of the County and City of Albany; also numerous catalogues, reports, papers, and circulars on various topics, and lectured before educational associations throughout New England. He was licensed as a preacher by vote of the Susquehanna Congregational Association.

He married in Boston, Massachusetts, 20 March 1852, Harriette Ackland Batchelder, preceptress of the Pittsfield High School, who died in Boscawen, New Hampshire, 13 September 1864. He married 19 September 1866, his second wife, Ellen J. LeGros of Great Falls, New Hampshire.

Dr. Tenney was a man of quiet and retiring habits; true and constant in friendship, intimate with few but courteous to all; a good conversationalist, laden with valuable knowledge; not an offhand public speaker, but he gave well-studied logic—"solid gold". He was a Mason in the Horace Chase Lodge, No. 72, Penacook, also in Temple Lodge, No. 14, Albany. He died after a brief illness; his picture is in the first edition of the "Tenney Family".
