= Albany City Hall =

Municipal government building in New York

- U.S. National Register of Historic Places
- U.S. Historic district – Contributing property
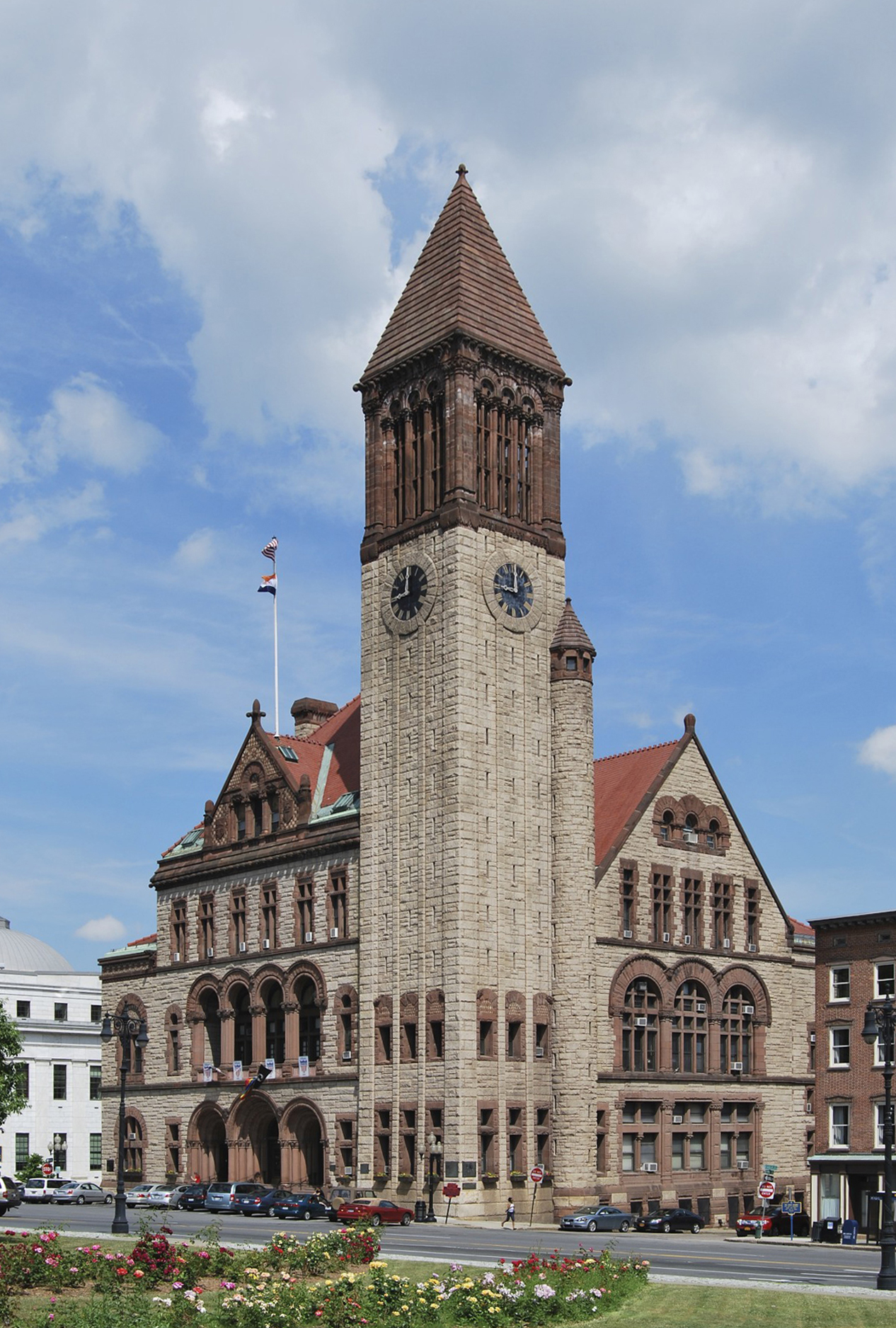
- City Hall from southwest, 2009

- Location within New York Location within the United States
- Interactive map showing Albany City Hall's location
- Location: Albany, New York
- Coordinates: 42°39′06″N 73°45′16″W
- Built: 1880; 146 years ago to 1883; 143 years ago
- Architect: Henry Hobson Richardson, Ogden & Gandner
- Architectural style: Richardson Romanesque
- Part of: Lafayette Park Historic District (ID78001837)
- NRHP reference No.: 72000812
- Added to NRHP: September 4, 1972

Albany City Hall is the seat of government of the city of Albany, New York, United States. It houses the office of the mayor, the Common Council chamber, the city and traffic courts, as well as other city services. The present building was designed by Henry Hobson Richardson in the Romanesque style and opened in 1883 at 24 Eagle Street, between Corning Place (then Maiden Lane) and Pine Street. It is a rectangular three-and-a-half-story building with a 202-foot-tall (62 m) tower at its southwest corner. The tower contains one of the few municipal carillons in the country, dedicated in 1927, with 49 bells.

Albany's first city hall was the Stadt Huys (/ˈstæt ˈhaɪs/; Dutch for "city hall"); sometimes written Stadt Huis), built by the Dutch at what is now the intersection of Broadway and Hudson Avenue, probably in the 1660s, though possibly earlier. It was probably replaced around 1740 with a larger Stadt Huys. In 1754, it was the site of the Albany Congress, where Benjamin Franklin presented the Albany Plan of Union, the first proposal to unite the British American colonies. After the American Revolution brought independence, Albany was declared the state capital in 1797 and the state legislature met in city hall. In 1809 the Legislature opened the first state capitol and Albany's government moved in with it. Two decades later, the city purchased a plot of land at the eastern end of Washington Avenue, across Eagle Street from the capitol and moved its government into a new city hall designed by Philip Hooker that opened in 1832.

In 1880, Hooker's building was destroyed by fire and a new design by Richardson was commissioned. The cornerstone was laid by the local Masonic fraternity in 1881; the building was completed and opened two years later. Because of budget restrictions the original interior was simply designed, consisting chiefly of beaded board partitions, and thus not fireproof; it was entirely rebuilt in 1916–18 from designs by Albany architects Ogden & Gander. The city hall remains essentially as altered at that time, and the exterior is considered one of Richardson's finest works. The building was added to the National Register of Historic Places (NRHP) in 1972; it is also a contributing property to the Lafayette Park Historic District, listed six years later.

== Building ==
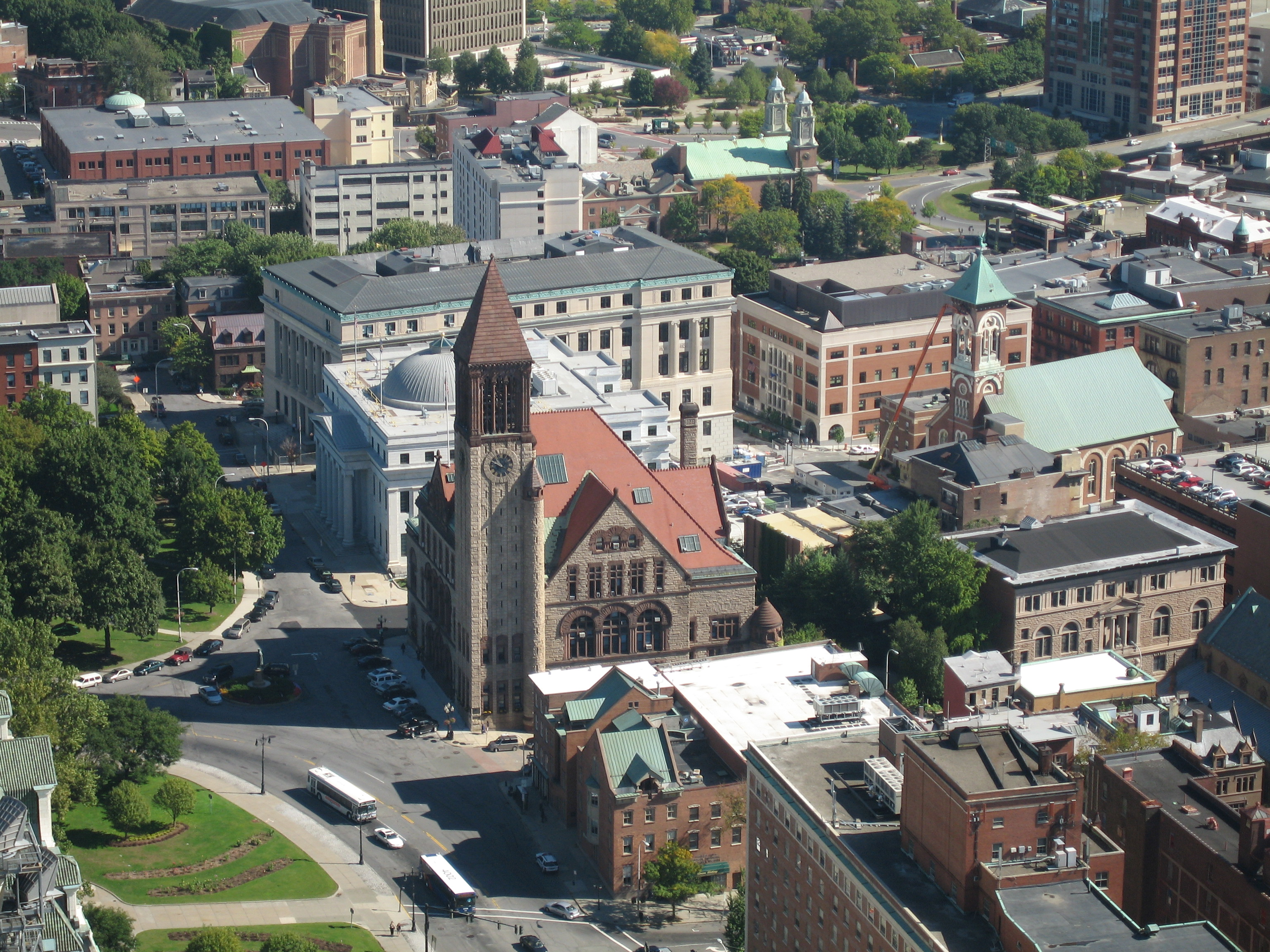
City Hall and its neighborhood seen from Erastus Corning Tower, Albany's tallest building

City Hall occupies the western half of the block with Eagle Street on the west, Lodge Street to the east, and Corning Place and Pine Street on the south and north. The land slopes gently down towards the Hudson River a half-mile (800 m) to the east-southeast, such that the building's rear foundation is exposed. The small Corning Park buffers the building from the Albany Masonic Temple to the east and some other smaller buildings on the block's northwest corner. Academy Park is to the northwest, and East Capitol Park to the southwest, with Washington Avenue (New York State Route 5) dividing them before it ends at the intersection with Eagle just in front of City Hall.

On all the other sides of the block the surrounding neighborhood is densely developed and urban, with primarily government, institutional and commercial buildings. Some of those buildings are also listed on the National Register. To the north, across Pine Street, is the New York Court of Appeals Building, where the state's highest court sits, with the old Albany County courthouse, now county offices, just to its north. Northwest, in Academy Park, is the Old Albany Academy Building, now headquarters of the Albany City School District. Looking west on Washington, the New York State Education Building is visible on the north a short distance away with the state capitol opposite. All, like City Hall, are also contributing properties to the Lafayette Park Historic District, listed on the Register in 1978.

=== Exterior ===
The building is a load-bearing masonry design laid out in a rectangle, with a 202-foot (62 m) tall, Venetian-style tower, topped by a pyramidal roof, on the southwest corner, and smaller round towers on the northeast and southeast. The nine-by-six-bay main structure is three-and-a-half stories tall. Its exterior walls are rusticated Milford granite with Longmeadow brownstone trim. It is topped with a red tiled cross-gabled roof, hipped on the east-west axis, with a nested gabled projection on either end. On the north side of the cross-gable tall chimneys rise on either side of the main gable; a third, shorter chimney rises from the roofline south of the cross-gable.

==== Main block ====
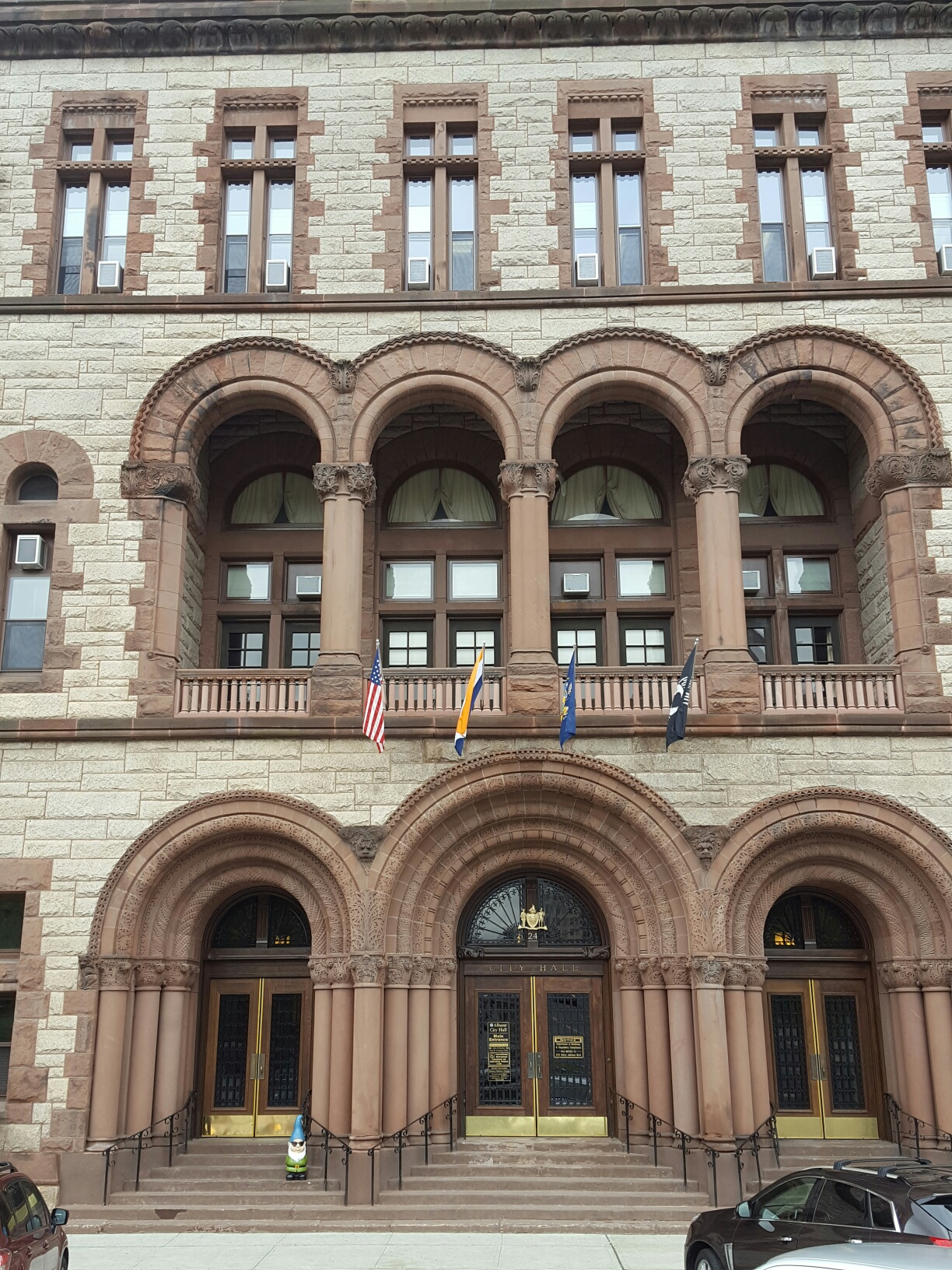
Front facade

On the west (front) elevation, narrowing steps with wrought iron decorative handrails lead up to the main entrance, triply-recessed triple stone rounded archways, with the central one slightly larger. The archways are flanked by smooth stone columns topped by Corinthian capitals. The arches themselves are segmented, with decorative leaf patterns carved onto them. Each entrance has a double wooden door, with brass trimmings, including kick plate, and glass window with iron grille. At the springline is a piece of carved wood; the one on the central entrance is more ornate, just below it the words "City Hall" are set in brass letters on the entablature. Above each is a semicircular glass transom with ornate iron radial muntins, divided at the center by a fluted wooden panel. Affixed to the one on the central entrance is a brass version of the city's coat of arms and the number 24, in brass.

To either side is a two-paned recessed casement window with transom and brownstone surround. On the north side is a recessed triple window with transom, stone-mullioned and round-arched with splayed stones, and a similar brownstone surround rising from the brownstone water table that runs from either side of the main entrance. All first-story windows have flower boxes, planted during the season.

On the north profile, fenestration begins on the west with a window with the same treatment as the one just around the corner from it. Below it are two barred rectangular casement windows. East of it, the rest of the facade projects out slightly; two brownstone courses begin at street level at that point. They are interrupted by three paired recessed one-over-one double-hung sash windows, each immediately below a recessed triple narrow one-over-one double-hung sash topped with two casement lights. At street level below the easternmost of these four is a side entrance to the building, wooden double doors with barred upper windows and a lower panel. Next to the upper portion on either side is a decorative stone panel on the facade depicting a carved tree.

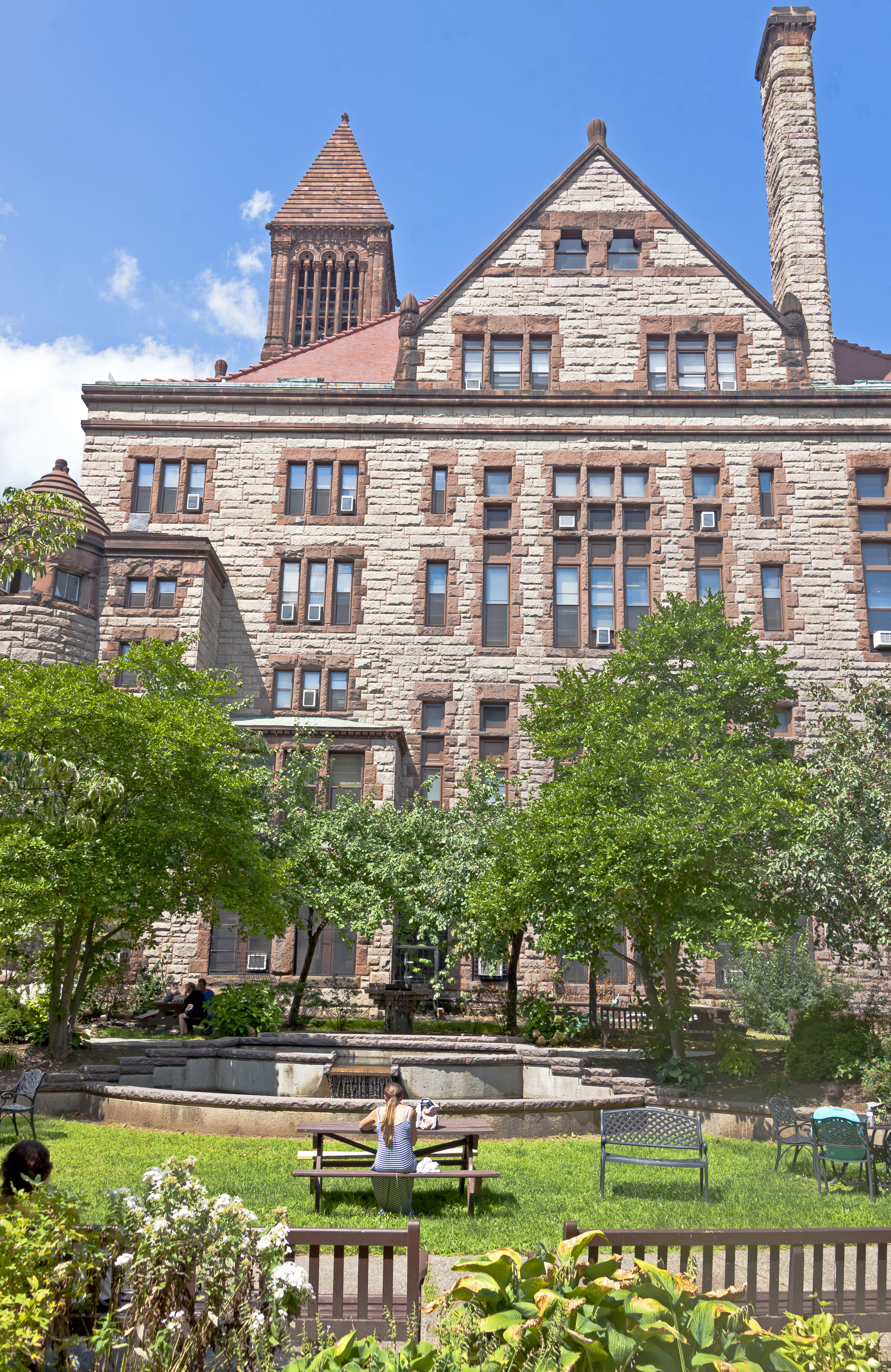
Rear view

The east (rear) facade, facing Corning Park, has exclusively double-hung one-over-one sash on the ground floor, with the same treatment but covered with protective metal screening, beginning with a pair at the corner next to the tower. Next to the south is a triple narrow window, followed by two wider ones. Above them, on the first floor, all windows are single versions of the narrow kind seen on the tower, with a wooden panel replacing the lower light. Midway across the facade a small pavilion projects outward with a small metal gate at its northern corner; on its ground floor is a double pair of narrow windows, with a single large one at the south corner. The first story on the pavilion has wider sash windows.

Adjacent to the tower on the ground floor of the south facade are two screen-protected double windows similar to those on the opposite side except for the mullions being recessed as well. Above them, displaced to the east, are a pair of double recessed windows identical to others on the first story but with only one transom. To the west the facade again projects slightly, aligning with the end of the gable atop it. The easternmost bay is taken, only at ground level, with a recessed entryway featuring double wooden paneled doors with barred upper windows identical to those on the opposite side entrance.

To the west the ground story has three pairs of screened deeply recessed double-hung one-over-one sash that get progressively shorter as the ground slopes up. They culminate with a similar double-pane casement window at the corner with the smaller of the southwest towers. Above them are three cross-windows, their mullions more decorative engaged round smooth columns with ornate capitals, matched by smaller ones between the upper lights. On the edges of the surrounds, narrow smooth round engaged columns support decorative capitals between the windows. Above the casement window, next to the tower, on this story, is another narrow sash window with transom similar to those seen elsewhere on the building.

A projecting stringcourse sets off the second story. Above the entrance is a quadruple-arched loggia opening from the Common Council chambers. Decorative stone balustrades are at the base of each arch; divided by a group of four engaged smooth round stone columns rising from rusticated plinths topped by Corinthian capitals. The arches themselves are formed of one course of segmented brownstone topped by splayed blocks with a decorative cornice along the top and decorative stonework in a leaf pattern at the springline. Behind each arch is a double wooden door with eight square glass panes, divided by a stone mullion and topped by one square glass light and an arched one above, set in a plainer splayed-block arch.

On either side of the loggia is a recessed narrow one-over-one double-hung sash with a blind third pane above. A stone course sets off the arched transom above, framed by a splayed block arch. To the north is a similarly treated wider double window, its tympanum painted with an intricate sunburst design. Around the corner, on the north facade, fenestration of the second story begins with a similarly styled window. To its east is a large quadruple window that echoes the loggia, with the same surrounds around groups of three narrow sash windows topped by two separated panes and tripartite transom under the arches.

On the east, the third story fenestration starts past the tower with a double version of the triple-hung sash two-transom windows on the tower, going into the fourth story. Next is a narrow single version, with a narrower, smaller version above, then double-hung with the lowest of three transoms on the story above blind, filled with a wooden panel, followed by a tripled version, flanked by a single one and then a pair of narrow windows similar to those on the other side. Triple versions of the narrow triple-hung follow on both stories. On the ell, where the beltcourse is absent, adjacent to the southeast tower are two small double-hung sash, with recessed double casement windows in decorative stonework around the top of the tower itself. It and the ell are topped by a stringcourse and molded-looking cornice.

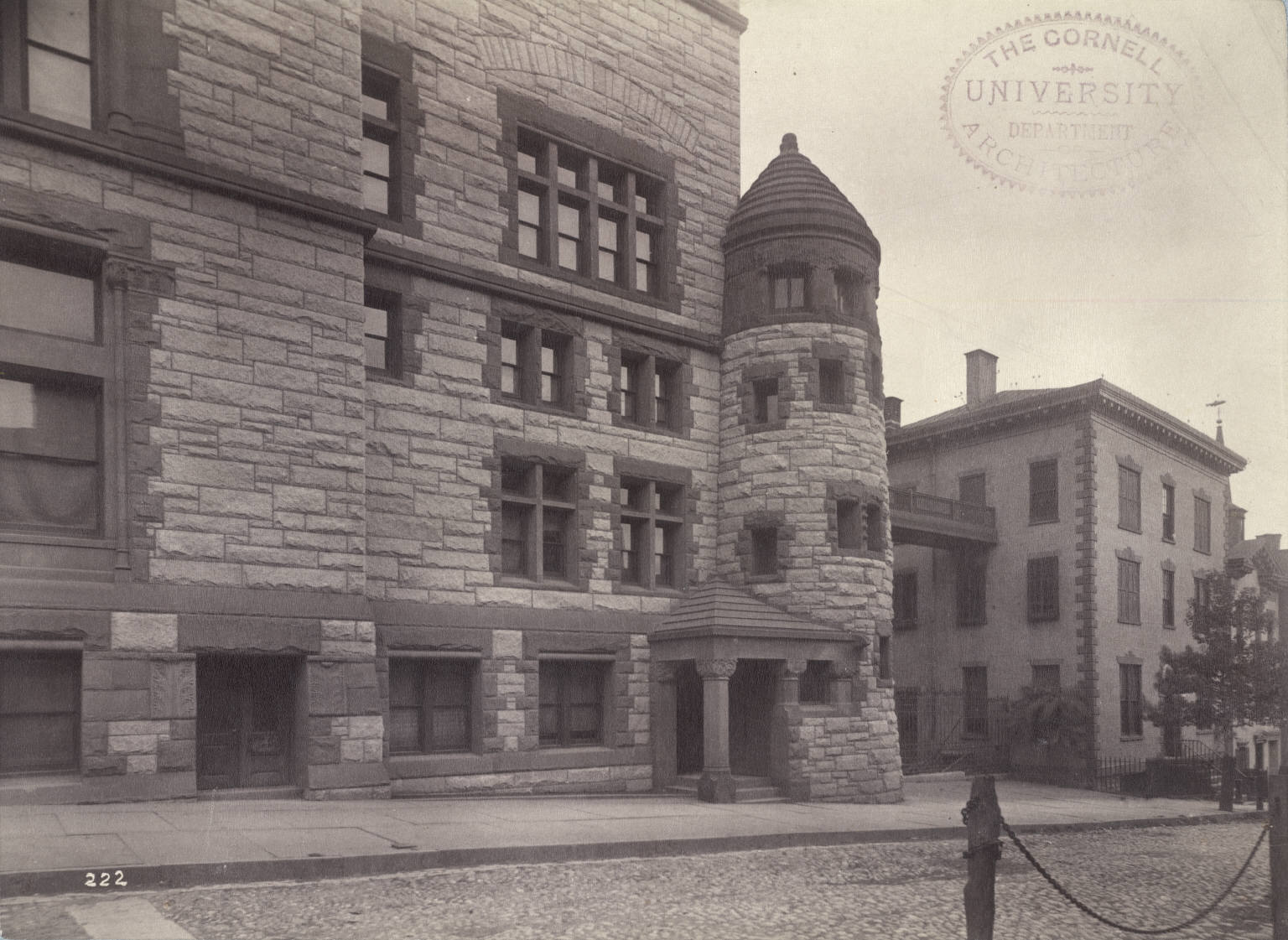
Southeast corner, facing Corning Place, c. 1895

The beltcourse returns on the south facade of the ell, setting off a quadruple version of the narrow double-hung single-upper-light sash, with a splayed block granite mustache in the facade above. Next to the corner of the main block is a single iteration of the same window. On the main block is a triple arched window just like that on the facade opposite.

Another, identical beltcourse sets off the third story. On the front it has six narrow double double-hung, with the single light above. The lintels above the main window and the transoms both are decorated to appear dentilled. Above is a stone cornice decorated in a leaf pattern. At the north a small parapet rises, set off by a gargoyle and decorated with a floral pattern that extends below the beltcourse.

Five windows stretch across the gable front on the third story of the north facade. All are recessed double-hung sash with two upper lights, wide and single on the sides with three narrower doubles between them. Above is a triple-arched window, smaller than the others two stories below but treated similarly, except for the lack of trim above the arches. The gable is framed by a stone cornice, with decorative floral stonework at the corners and a rounded finial at the apex.

The east gable facade has on the lower story two sets of recessed double-hung sash flanked on either side by narrower versions, all three topped by transoms without any stone separator, rising from the upper of two stringcourses. Above them, in the apex, are two small recessed double-hung sash rising from a brownstone beltcourse, with the uppermost adjacent stones widening like a capital but flat and plain on the front. A wider brownstone course tops the windows. The gable has the same treatment as the north face.

The south gable face is identical to the one on the north facade opposite in fenestration and treatment. On the west, the top gable pierces the roof above two shingle-cut stone courses. The three central recessed double-hung one-over-one sash rise from a stone cornice in which three pierced quatrefoils have been cut in the stone beneath the windowsills. Two joined engaged Corinthian columns divide the central window from those in its flanks, which are in turn flanked with single versions of the column. All three windows have decorative stonework above the lintel; above them is a course of vertical blocks and a cornice that forms a splayed-block arch above the central window. Its tympanum is blind, decorated with sunburst artwork similar to that found below on the front facade.

That pattern also fills the gable apex; on the sides of the windows is a checkerboard pattern. Stone shields are affixed to either side; the one at the south has the city's coat of arms on it. The gable edge has the same decorative treatment as the other three.

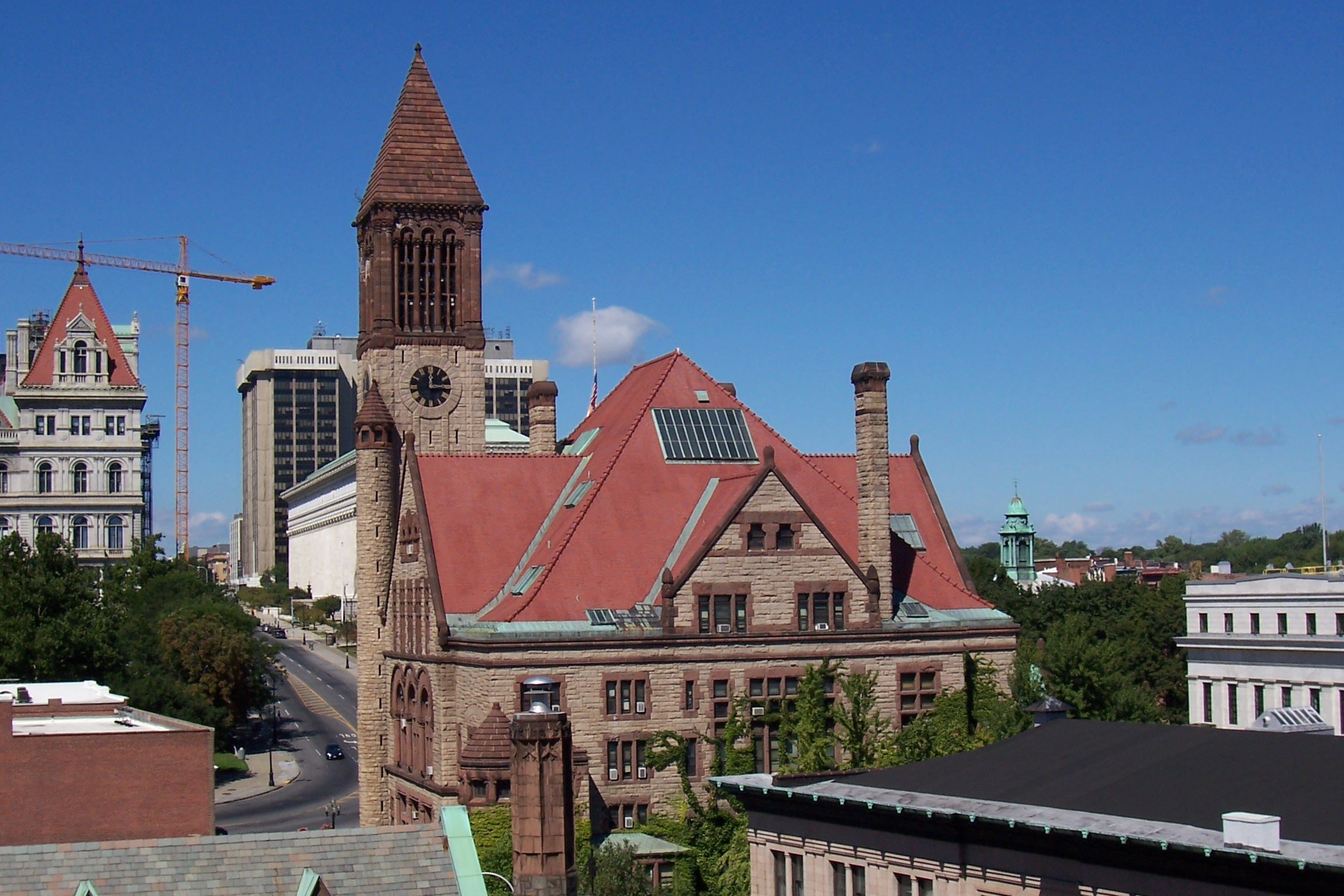
View of east and south roof from southeast

On the roof there are several small skylights next to the eastern and northern gable. A larger one is located higher on the east pitch of the northern gable, with two similarly-sized on the south face of the main gable east of the southern cross-gable. Just east of the southwestern chimney is an 18-cell solar cell array; a 27-cell array is on the east of the main gable just below the apex.

==== Towers ====
At the northeast corner is an engaged round tower with five bays. Fenestration on the first story is three windows with similar treatment to those on the neighboring north facade, except with two double windows on either side of a triple, and another double where the tower meets the east facade. Below are double-hung one-over-one sash, again like those on the north facade but without the bars, one beneath each double and two beneath the triple. On its third story are a group of three double windows with a single square transom, except for the second where a third transom is located in a dormer front that rises from the molded cornice to pierce the tower's conical roof. Rounded finials are at the apex and corners of the dormer gable.

The southeast tower fenestration consists of small deeply recessed casement windows ascending in a spiral pattern. On its west side is a small porch, with a stone-shingled peaked roof supported by an octagonal smooth stone column with decorative capital. To its east is a blind window in a small upper bay flanked by engaged pilasters similar to the porch column. The porch shelters a wooden paneled door with modern metal handle. setting off a conical shingled stone roof topped on the tower by a rounded finial.

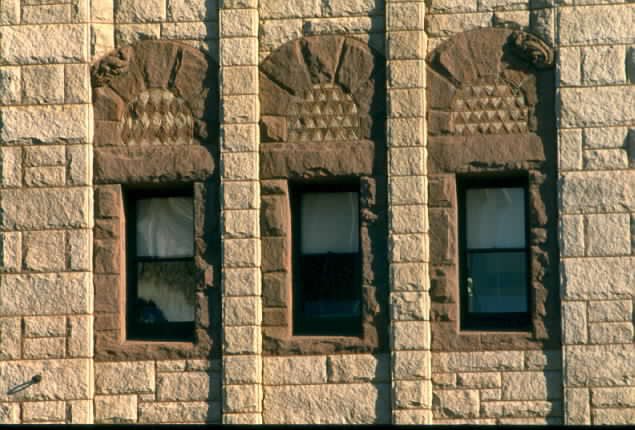
Second story windows on main tower

The largest tower, the 202-foot (62 m) southwest tower, is square. At the first story it has three double-hung sash topped with a single light on both faces, in slight vertical recesses that continue up the entire face. Above them are three double-hung one-over-one topped by tympanums filled with the diamond pattern at left and the triangular one in the other two. On the tower's southeast is a small, narrow round tower with no fenestration save crenellation.

Above the second story the main tower is crenellated as well. The smaller tower is topped with a small conical shingled roof, rising to a small finial, above the level of the main block's lower cross-gable; just below its bracketing are several small windows set in brownstone. Just above that roof is the clock face on all four faces of the tower, with a splayed surround.

The upper stage of the tower, above the clock face, is a brownstone belfry. It has three narrow double-crossed openings topped by splayed-block arches rising from a decorative cornice. At the corners grouped smooth round columns with Corinthian capitals support a dentilled cornice. The pyramidal stone shingled roof is topped with a small round finial.

=== Interior ===
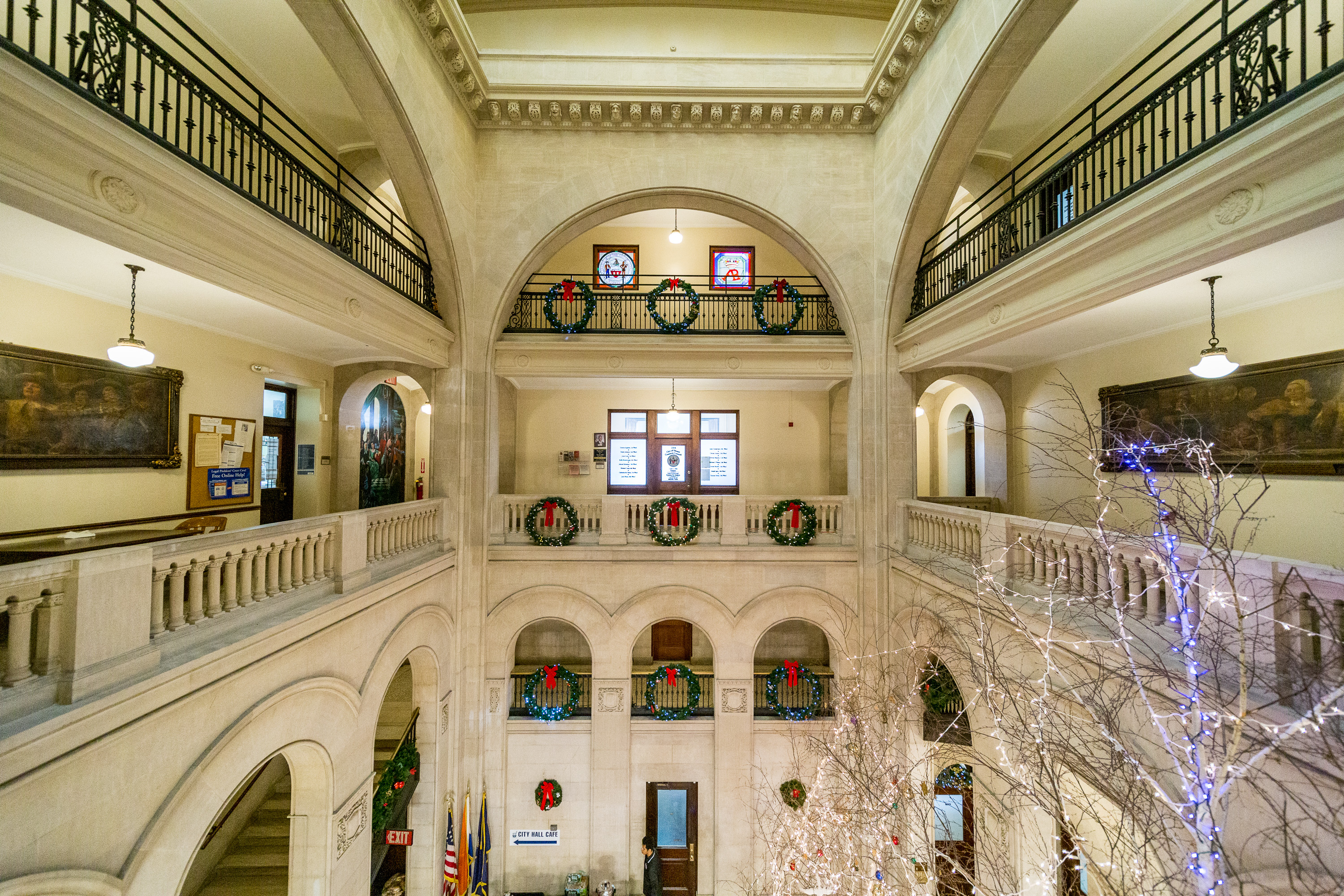
Interior atrium decorated for the December holidays.

The main entrances open into a lobby with a polished stone floor on which a decorative diamond pattern surrounds the city seal. A gently arched passageway, with arched doorways (including that for the elevator), leads into the building's central atrium. There the square enclosed diamond pattern on the floor continues, with a small circle in the middle.

From both north and south, stairs ascend to the second story and descend to the ground floor. Flat curved arches supported by engaged pillars and topped with molding rise up on three sides to create a triforium. At the second story all have the blank shield design found on the exterior west facade's fourth-story windows. The staircases and the triforium both have railings of black painted metal with a brass handrail.

At the third story a stone balustrade replaces the arches, with some decorative carving on the cornice stone. Another metal railing, with intermittent decorative patterns, runs around the fourth floor, topped by gentle, wide arches. Both are lit by a single fixture on each side hanging from a chain. At the ceiling of the atrium is a cornice with decorative dentils.

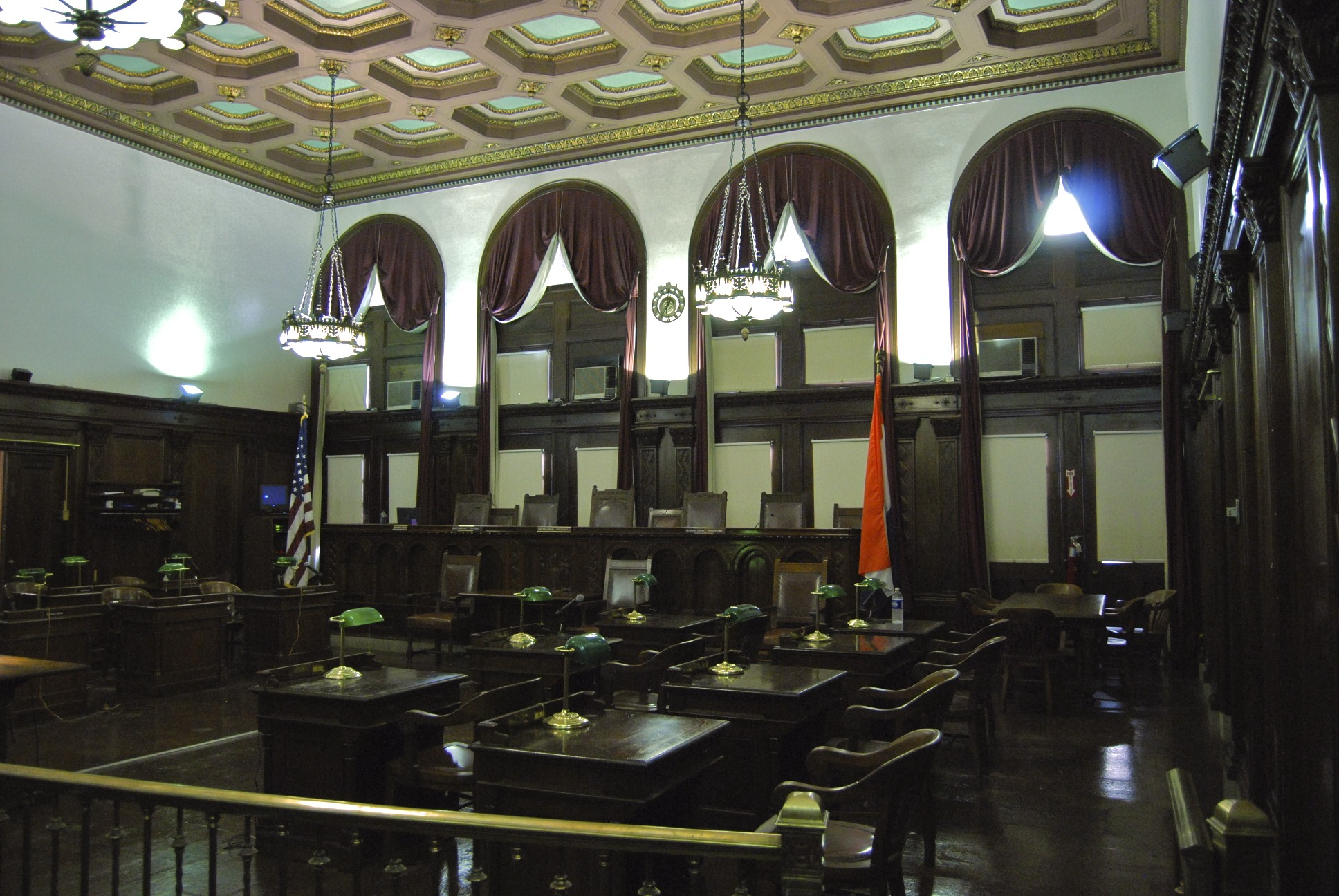
Common Council Chamber

Most of the rooms in City Hall are the offices of the mayor, city officials and departments. Albany's city council meets in a chamber just inside the loggia on the second story's west facade. Valances hang in the arches of the entryways, separated by two flat square engaged decorated wooden pilasters, just behind the wooden desk, carved with arches on the front echoing those on the wall behind, where the president of the 16-member council sits alongside the mayor and other officials during meetings. The other members sit at desks along the sides.

The floor is polished dark hardwood. A metal railing with brass handrail separates public viewing at the rear. The north and south walls are decorated with recessed wooden panels separated by pilasters with the same treatment as those on the west wall. They rise to a plain frieze topped by a decorative wooden cornice at the height of the separation between the upper and lower lights in the loggia windows. Above those lights, in the loggia windows, are recessed wooden panels. Decorative molding sets off a coffered ceiling from which a central chandelier is augmented by two fixtures hanging on chains over the desk at west and upward-pointing spotlights on the walls.

== Former city halls ==
Albany has had multiple buildings dedicated to being the seat of city government through its history; most have been replaced following fires. Historians disagree on details of many of the earlier structures, and when they were built.

=== Stadt Huys ===
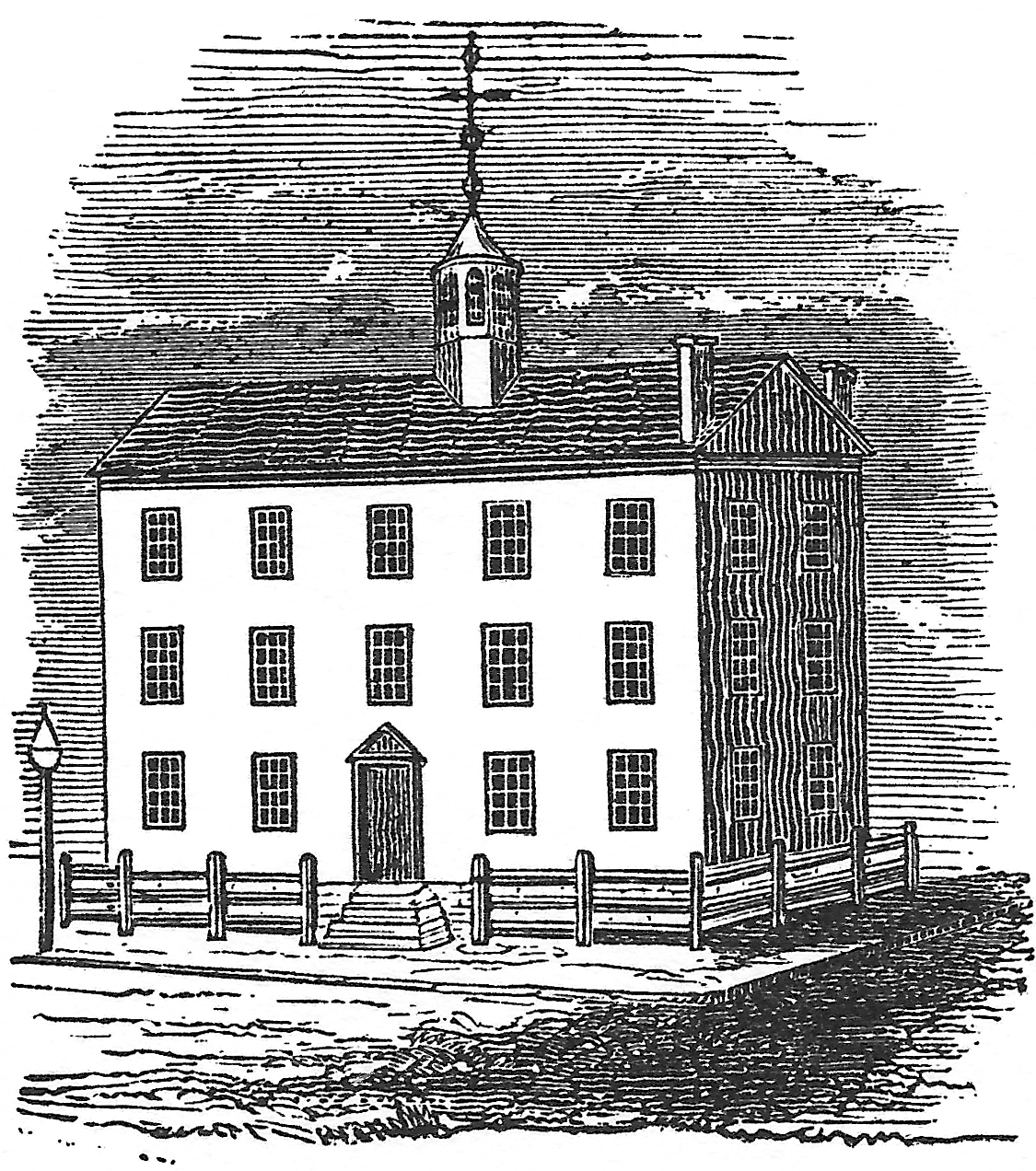
The 1740s city hall

Albany's original city hall, the Stadt Huys, may have been built as early as 1635. Evidence from the journals of Wouter van Twiller, Director of New Netherland from 1633 to 1638, suggests that at least some type of punitory building was built on the site during his term. George Howell and Jonathan Tenney, in their book Bi-centennial History of Albany, cite reports from 1646 describing the building as a substantial (at least for its time) three-story structure, with the lower floor built of stone and used as a jail. By contrast, another Albany historian, Cuyler Reynolds, writes that the Stadt Huys was not built until 1673. Both historians agree that it stood at the northeast corner of today's Hudson Avenue and Broadway, the current site of the SUNY System Administration Building. The Stadt Huys officially became city hall when the Dongan Charter incorporated Albany as a city in 1686. A 1695 engraved map of Albany depicts the Stadt Huys at that location.

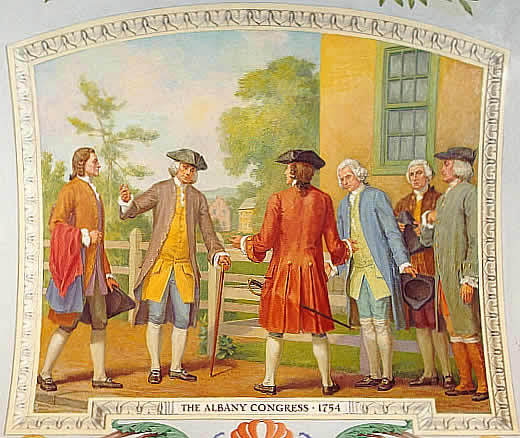
Delegates converse outside the Stadt Huys during the Albany Congress.

A new city hall was probably built on the site around 1740; historians at the New York State Museum (NYSM) put its completion date as the following year. The city government, quickly outgrowing the space, was able to secure constructionfunds from the provincial government. This building retained the Dutch name, even though it was new and the English had been in control of New York for more than 75 years. The NYSM describes the new Stadt Huys as a three-story brick structure, adding that it was "more substantial" than its predecessor. The new building was the third-largest in Albany, surpassed only by that era's local Dutch church and Fort Albany. The roof of the new structure was gabled and topped with a cupola and belfry. Howell and Tenney say the original Stadt Huys was in use for at least 160 years (meaning a replacement structure would not have been needed until 1795 at the earliest), which contradicts with accounts of the new Stadt Huys's construction in the 1740s.

In 1754, the Stadt Huys was the site of the Albany Congress where Benjamin Franklin of Pennsylvania presented the Albany Plan of Union, the first formal proposal to unite the British American colonies. The intent was to defend against aggressions of the French to the north rather than become independent from the British crown. It was never adopted by the British Parliament; later it was seen as an important precursor to the United States Constitution. A month prior to the meeting, Franklin published his Join, or Die political cartoon, a graphical representation of the plan.

During the Revolutionary War, City Hall was home to the Albany Committee of Correspondence (the political arm of the local revolutionary movement), which took over operation of city government in 1775 and eventually controlled all of Albany County (at that time the largest county in the colony, extending far past its current borders). Tories and prisoners of war were often held in the building with common criminals. Following the war, city hall was an occasional meeting place of the newly formed New York Legislature, in addition to being home to the city and county governments, jail, courts, and local registry.

In 1797 Albany was declared capital of the state and the legislature made City Hall its home until the first state capitol was opened in 1809. In an effort to move public buildings away from the bustling and expanding waterfront, the new capitol was located atop the State Street hill, directly in front of where the current building stands. City surveyor Simeon De Witt, in his 1794 city plan, marks this land as a public square; it had been dedicated for public purposes since the late 17th century. Also included on DeWitt's map are depictions of City Hall and the new city jail, located at State and Eagle Streets. In 1809, Albany city government moved with the Legislature into the new capitol and remained there until a new city hall was opened in 1832. The old Stadt Huys was demolished after an 1836 fire.

=== 1832 city hall ===
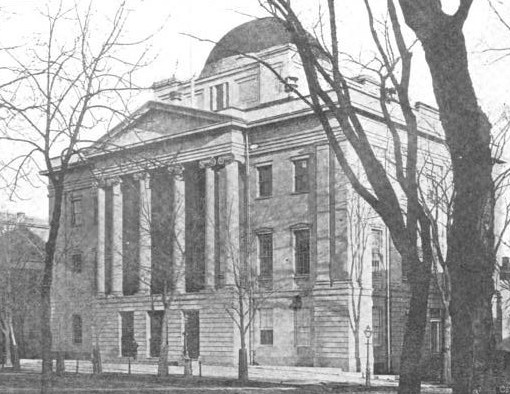
The 1832 city hall was a Greek Revival building designed by Philip Hooker; it was destroyed by fire in 1880.

In order to move city and county government out of the state capitol, in 1832 the city bought a plot of land to build on facing the public square opposite the capitol, on Eagle Street at the eastern end of Lion Street (later renamed Washington Avenue) from St. Peter's Church for $10,295.95 (equivalent to $355,000 in 2024). A design competition for the new City Hall was won by Albany architect Philip Hooker and Boston architect John Kutts. Hooker was charged with integrating components of both architect's proposals into one coherent design. The cornerstone was laid by Mayor John Townsend in a Masonic ceremony in 1829. Construction was completed three years later at a cost of about $92,000 (equivalent to $3,171,000 in 2024).

The design combined neoclassical and Greek Revival detailing, and was built of white marble quarried by inmates at Sing Sing prison, with an entrance porch supported by six Ionic columns. A large belvedere supported a dome that was later gilded. The principal rooms of the interior continued the monumental detailing of the exterior. A full-length statue of Alexander Hamilton by Robert Ball Hughes stood in the center of the upper hall, between the Court room and the Common Council Chamber. On one side of this hall was a bas-relief of DeWitt Clinton, with a view of a primitive Erie Canal boat in the distance, and on the opposite wall was a similar figure of Sir Walter Scott. Both of these panels were executed by William Coffee. This building, too, was destroyed by fire, in 1880.

== Current city hall ==
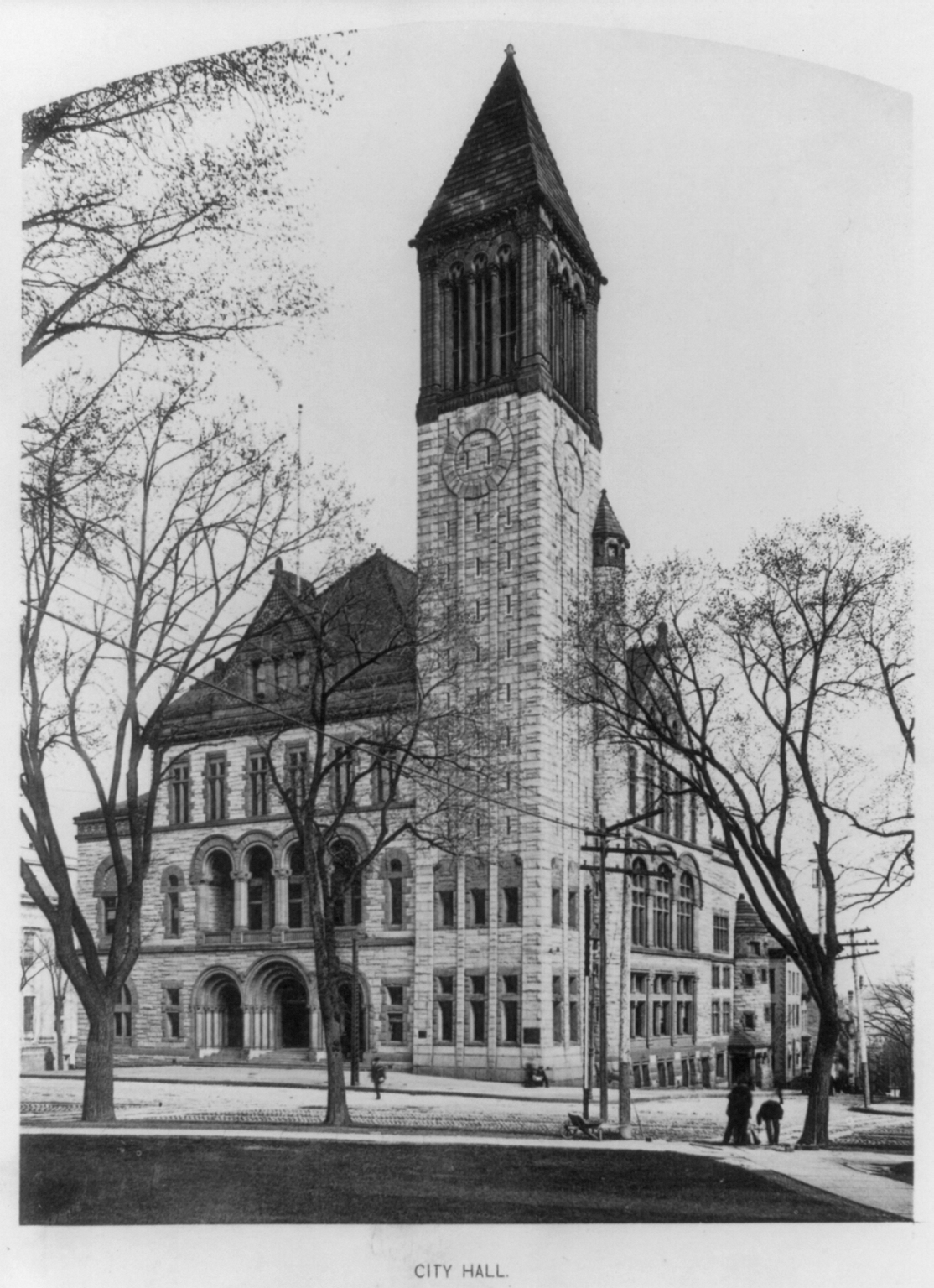
Albany City Hall in 1897

After the fire, Henry Hobson Richardson, then one of a team of architects working on the nearby state capitol, secured the commission for the replacement city hall after a limited competition between six architects and firms. The budget for the new city hall was $185,000 (equivalent to $5,147,000 in 2024); Richardson's design came in just under that. The appointed public committee increased the budget to $204,000 ($5.68 million) after granite was substituted for brownstone in the design. The new city hall design dates from the period regarded as Richardson's architectural peak. It was similar to others executed in his personal version of the Romanesque style. Architectural historian Henry-Russell Hitchcock described city hall as "one of Richardson's most Romanesque designs" and the building's NRHP nomination adds that its "banded arches, rhythmic fenestration, bold expression of materials and corner placement of the tower are characteristic features of Richardson's work often to be repeated by his followers."

Except for the bold asymmetrical placement of the tower, a prime example of Richardson's disregard for architectural correctness known for being one of his best tower designs, the building is noted for its general simplicity and care for small details, especially its intricate carvings. The entranceway is a simple triple-arch loggia; other design elements on the front façade are limited to its windows and a quadruple-arch balcony off the Common Council chamber. It is flanked by multiple tiers of relief sculpture and gargoyles. Most of the stonecutters brought to Albany to work on the capitol were later hired to do the sculptural details on City Hall.

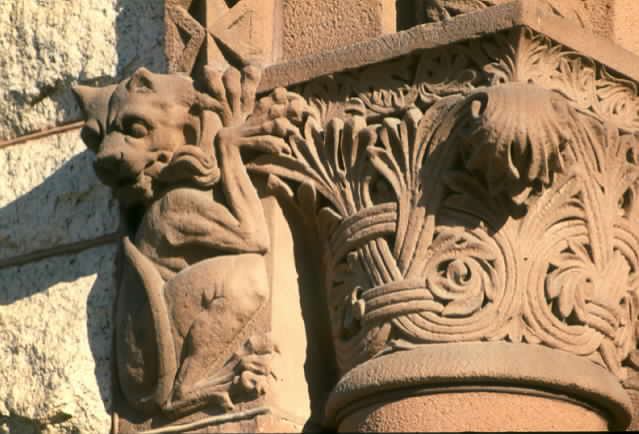
Stonework detail

Many elements of the exterior design are representations of interior functionality. Because the Common Council chamber is located on the second floor (above the entrance), that story is the same height as the first-floor entrance hall. The tower is essentially windowless because it was meant to be the city archive; a round staircase extends up the southeast corner of the tower for access. The short tower on the building's southeast corner was originally meant to be the transition between city hall and the never-built jail, complete with a "bridge of sighs" to transport inmates straight from their cells to courtrooms in city hall.

Due to lack of funds at the time (the building's initial budget doubled, ending up at $325,000 (equivalent to $9,042,000 in 2024) including furnishings), Richardson devoted most of his efforts to the building's exterior. The Times Union wrote later, "There wasn't enough money for Richardson to do the job as thoroughly as he would have liked. He said in his writing that if there wasn't sufficient money, he'd rather do it right on the outside and leave it to a future generation to finish the interior. The interior was finished by city architects a good 30 years after Richardson built it." Those "city architects" were Ogden and Gander who designed the alterations in 1916 that were completed in 1918. The mayor's office is on the first floor of the tower, with a painting of the city's first mayor, Pieter Schuyler; the Council chamber and offices are on the building's second floor, and the city clerk's office is on the second floor of the tower.

Under the leadership of William Gorham Rice, an Albany native who had run for mayor and served in some appointed state positions, in 1927 a carillon was added to the tower; it contained 60 bells (though it produced only 47 different notes, since the top 13 notes each had two bells) made by John Taylor & Co in England. Financed by public donations (from over 25,000 people), it cost $63,000 (equivalent to $9,201,000 in 2024) and was the first municipal carillon in the United States. Six decades later Mayor Thomas Whalen III had it restored, replacing 30 bells, removing the doubles, and adding two notes to its repertoire. The 49 bells weigh 27 short tons (24,000 kg) in total. The largest is 5 feet 9 inches (175 cm) in diameter and weighs 10,953 pounds (4,968 kg). The carillon is still in use and is played during concerts several times a week.

The clock faces on the tower were added in the 1920s, possibly around the same time as the carillon. An 1897 image of the city hall shows the tower without the clock faces. City Hall was added to the NRHP on September 4, 1972.

== See also ==
- List of mayors of Albany, New York
- National Register of Historic Places listings in Albany, New York
- Statue of Philip Schuyler, formerly placed in front of city hall, removed in 2023
