= Albany, New York =

Capital city of New York, United States

Albany
- State capital city
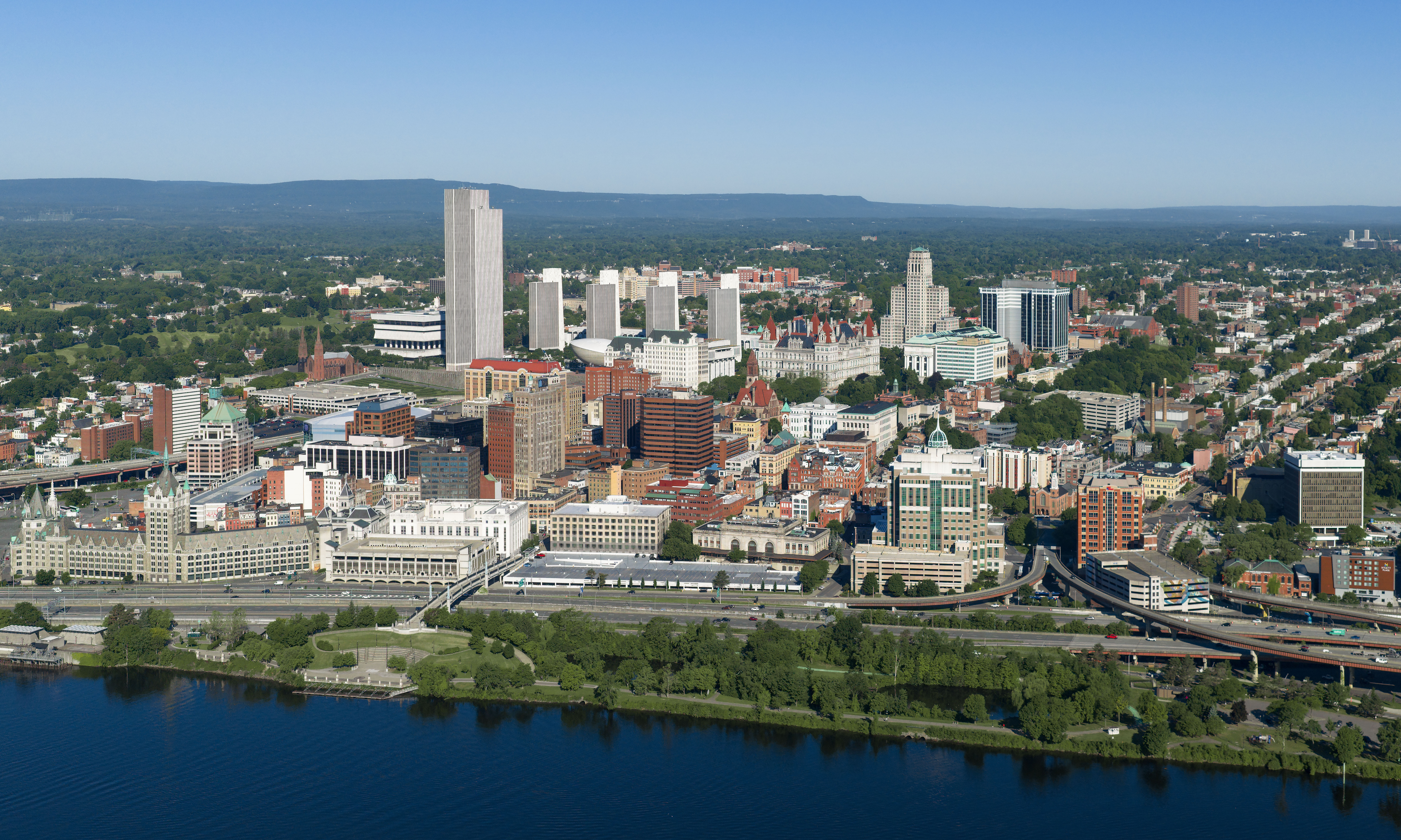
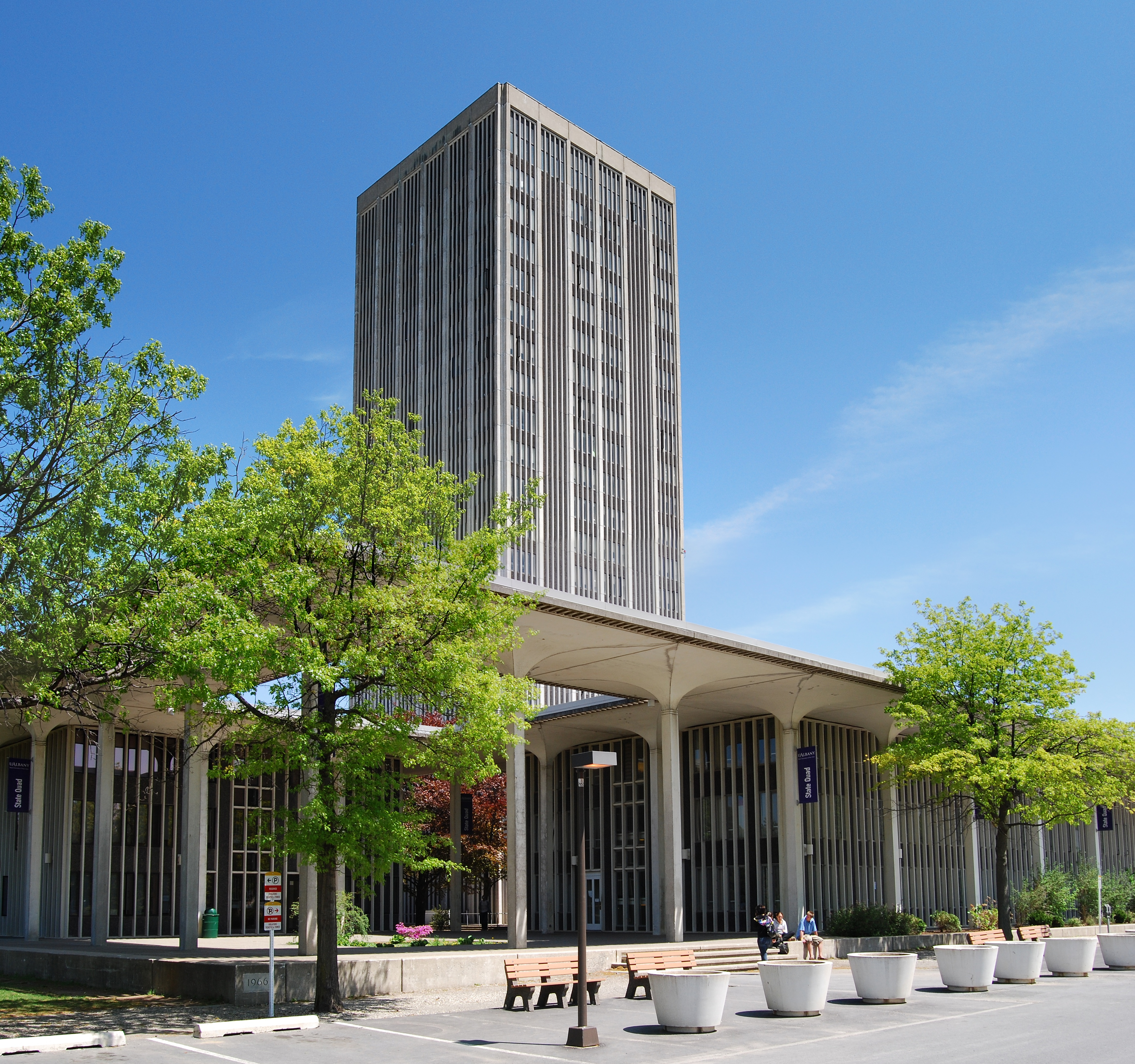
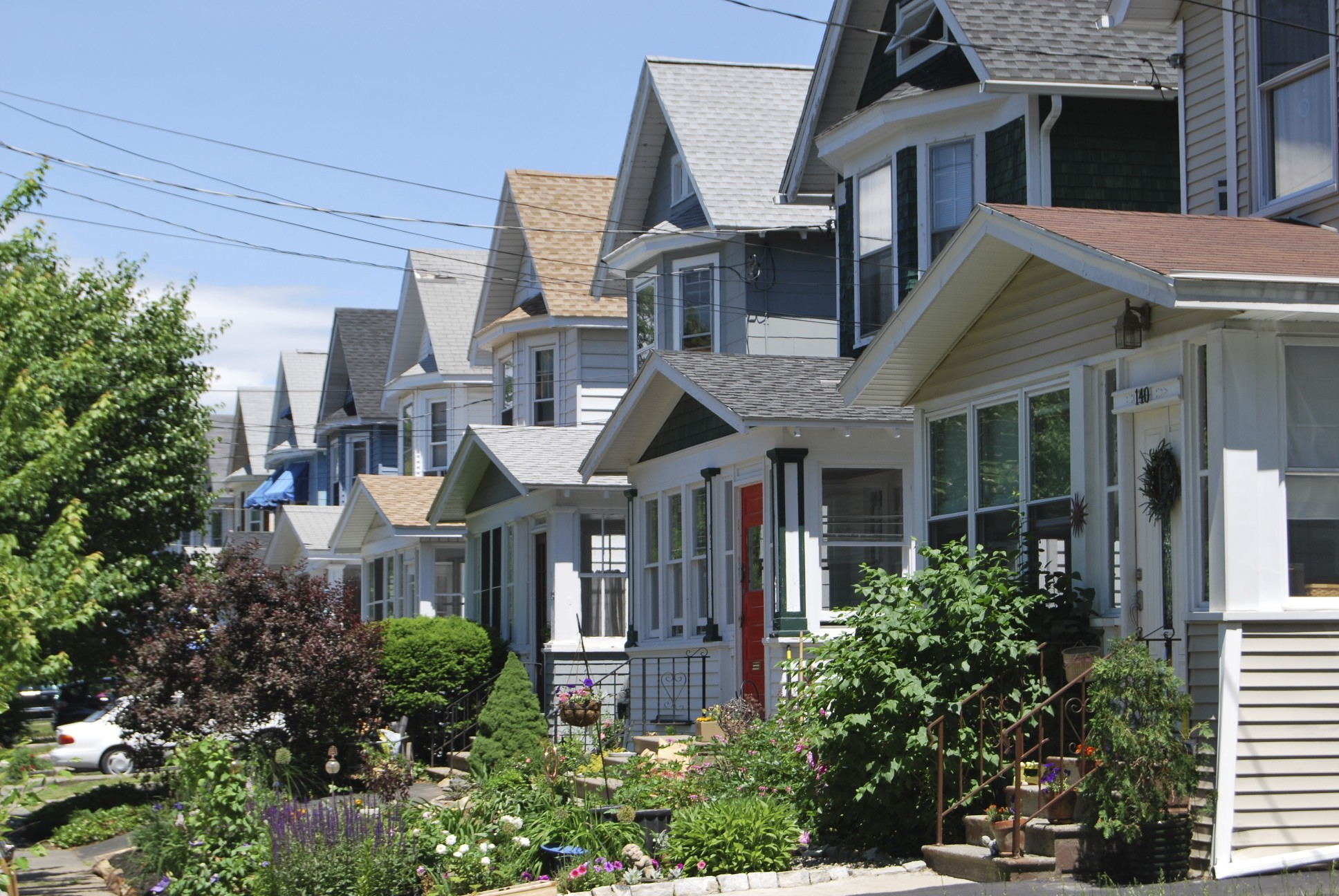
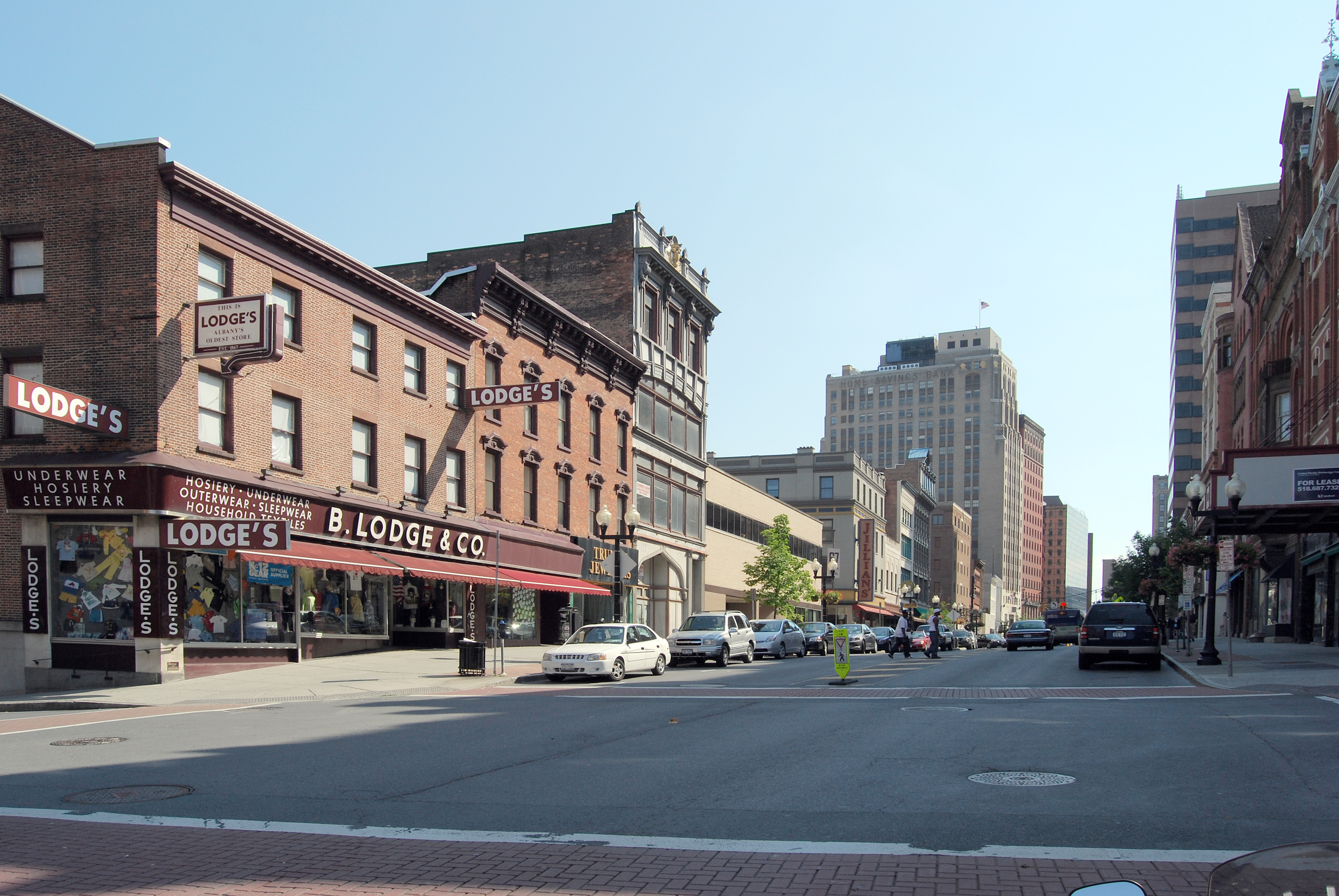
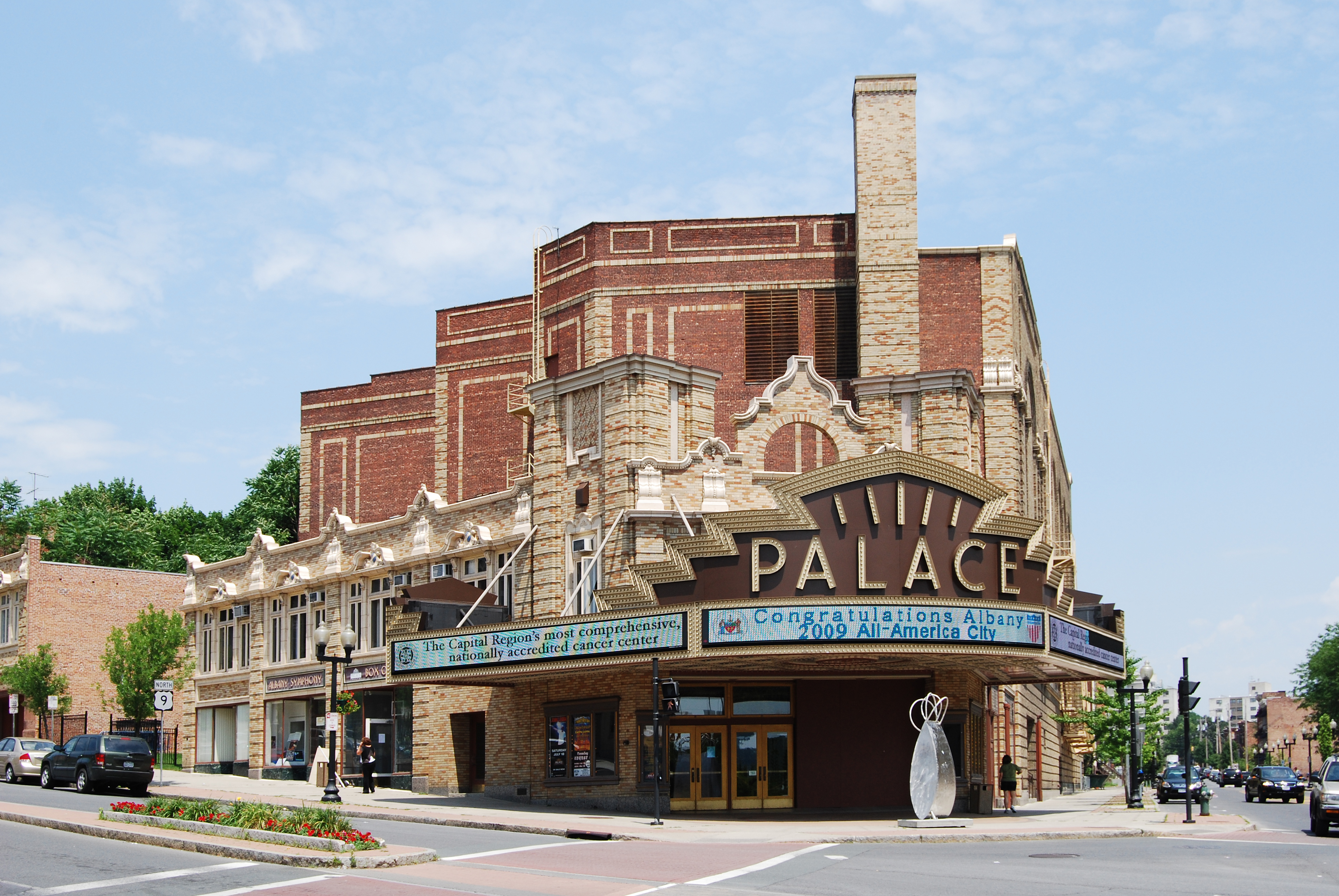
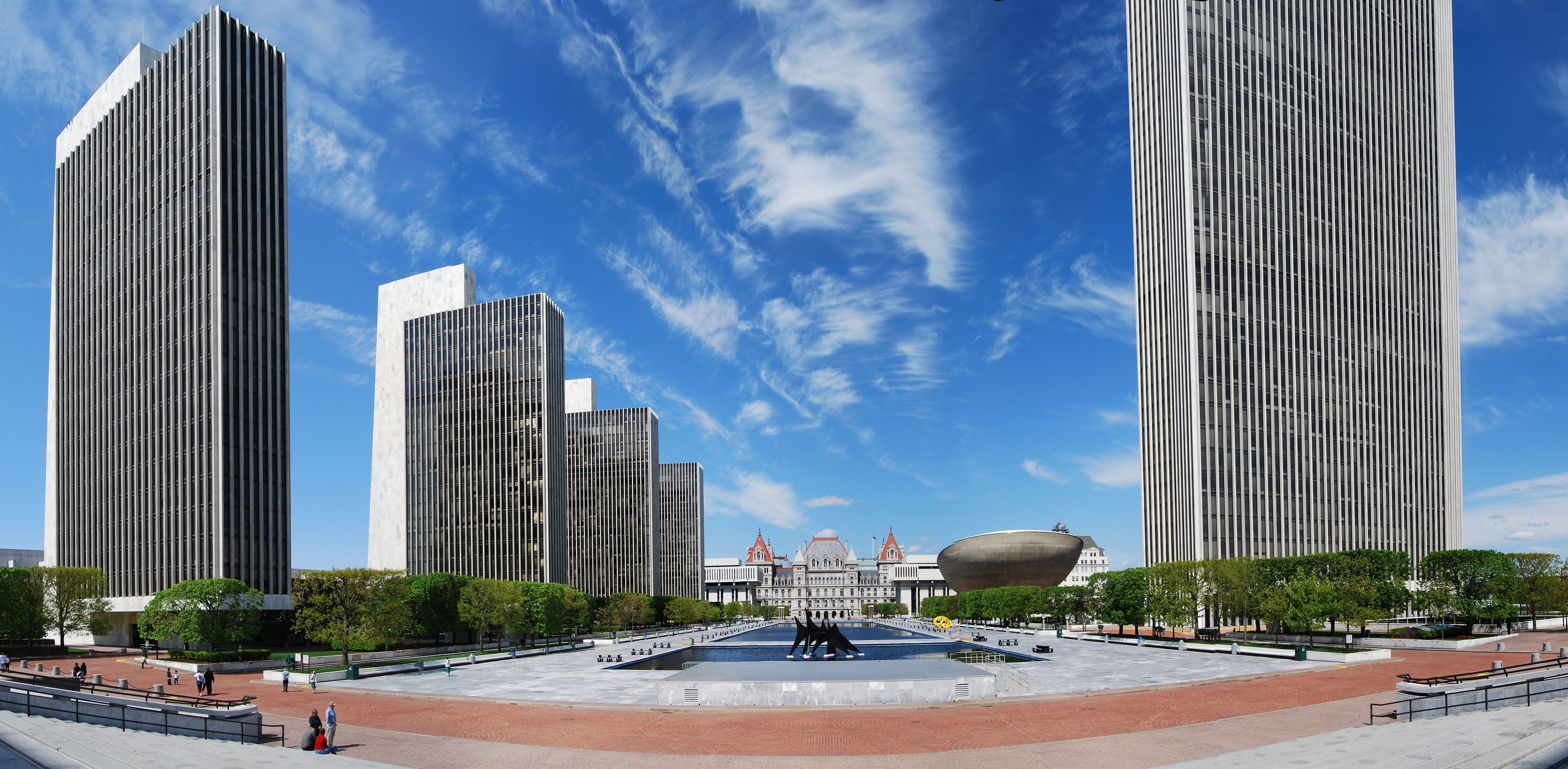
- Downtown Albany skyline from the east State Quad at SUNY Albany Helderberg neighborhood North Pearl Street Palace Theatre Empire State Plaza from the Cultural Education Center

- Flag Seal Coat of arms Wordmark
- Etymology: Named for the Scottish Duke of Albany, whose title comes from the Gaelic name for Scotland: Alba
- Nicknames: Smalbany (Note: Also spelled Smallbany); The 518 (Note: For the area code.); Cradle of the Union (Note: MSN Encarta states that this nickname "resulted from the meeting here in 1754 of the Albany Congress, which adopted Benjamin Franklin's Plan of Union, the first formal proposal to unite the colonies.)
- Motto: Assiduity (Note: In this instance, assiduity, "the quality of acting with constant and careful attention.")
- Interactive map of Albany
- Location within the state of New York Location within the Contiguous United States
- Coordinates: 42°39′09″N 073°45′26″W
- Country: United States
- State: New York
- Metropolitan area: Capital District
- County: Albany
- Settled: 1614; 412 years ago
- Incorporated: 1686; 340 years ago

Government
  - Type: Strong mayor-council
  - Mayor: Dorcey Applyrs (D)

Area
  - State capital city: 21.93 sq mi (56.81 km^{2})
  - Land: 21.41 sq mi (55.44 km^{2})
  - Water: 0.53 sq mi (1.38 km^{2})
  - Metro: 2,811.6 sq mi (7,282 km^{2})
- Elevation: 148 ft (45 m)
- Highest elevation (Loudonville (Note: On Birch Hill Road near Loudonville Reservoir.)): 378 ft (115 m)
- Lowest elevation (Hudson River (Note: Mean water elevation, varies with the tide.)): 2 ft (0.61 m)

Population (2020)
  - Estimate (2025): 101,698
  - Density: 4,729/sq mi (1,825.9/km^{2})
  - Urban: 593,142 (US: 73rd)
  - Urban density: 2,186/sq mi (844.1/km^{2})
  - Metro: 913,485 (US: 65th)
  - Metro density: 416.3/sq mi (160.7/km^{2})
- Time zone: UTC−5 (EST)
  - Summer (DST): UTC−4 (EDT)
- ZIP Codes: 12201–12212, 12214, 12220, 12222–12232
- Area codes: 518, 838
- Geocode: 977310, 978659
- ISO 3166 code: 36-01000
- FIPS code: 36-01000
- GNIS feature ID: 977310
- Website: albanyny.gov

Albany (/ˈɔːlbəni/ AWL-bə-nee) is the capital city of the U.S. state of New York. It is also the county seat of, and the most populous city in Albany County. Albany is located on the west bank of the Hudson River, approximately ten miles (16 km) south of its confluence with the Mohawk River. Its population was 99,224 at the time of the 2020 census and was estimated at 102,305 in 2026.

The oldest city in New York, the City of Albany is the economic and cultural core of New York State's Capital District. The Capital District is a metropolitan area including the nearby cities and suburbs of Colonie, Schenectady, Saratoga Springs and Troy. With an estimated 1.3 million residents, the Capital District is one of the most populous metropolitan areas and is the fastest-growing region in Upstate New York.

The area that ultimately became Albany was originally inhabited by Algonquian-speaking Mohicans. The area was settled by Dutch colonists, who built Fort Nassau in 1614 for fur trading and Fort Orange in 1624. In 1664, the English took over the Dutch settlements, renaming the city "Albany" in honor of the Scottish title of the Duke of York (later James II of England and Ireland and James VII of Scotland): the Duke of Albany. The city was officially chartered in 1686 under English rule. It became the capital of New York in 1797 after the formation of the United States. Albany is the oldest surviving settlement of the original British Thirteen Colonies north of Virginia.

In the late 18th century and throughout most of the 19th, Albany was a center of trade and transportation. The city lies toward the north end of the navigable Hudson River. It was the original eastern terminus of the Erie Canal and was home to some of the earliest railroads in the world. In the 1920s, a powerful political machine controlled by the Democratic Party emerged in Albany. Albany's population shrank because of urban sprawl and suburbanization in the latter part of the 20th century. In the 1990s, the New York State Legislature approved for the city a US$234 million building and renovation plan, which spurred downtown redevelopment. Since 2020, the economy of Albany and the surrounding Capital District has been directed toward artificial intelligence, AI-based photonics, quantum computing hardware manufacturing, nanotechnology, and digital electronics.

== History ==
=== Mohican, Mohawk, and Dutch before 1660 ===
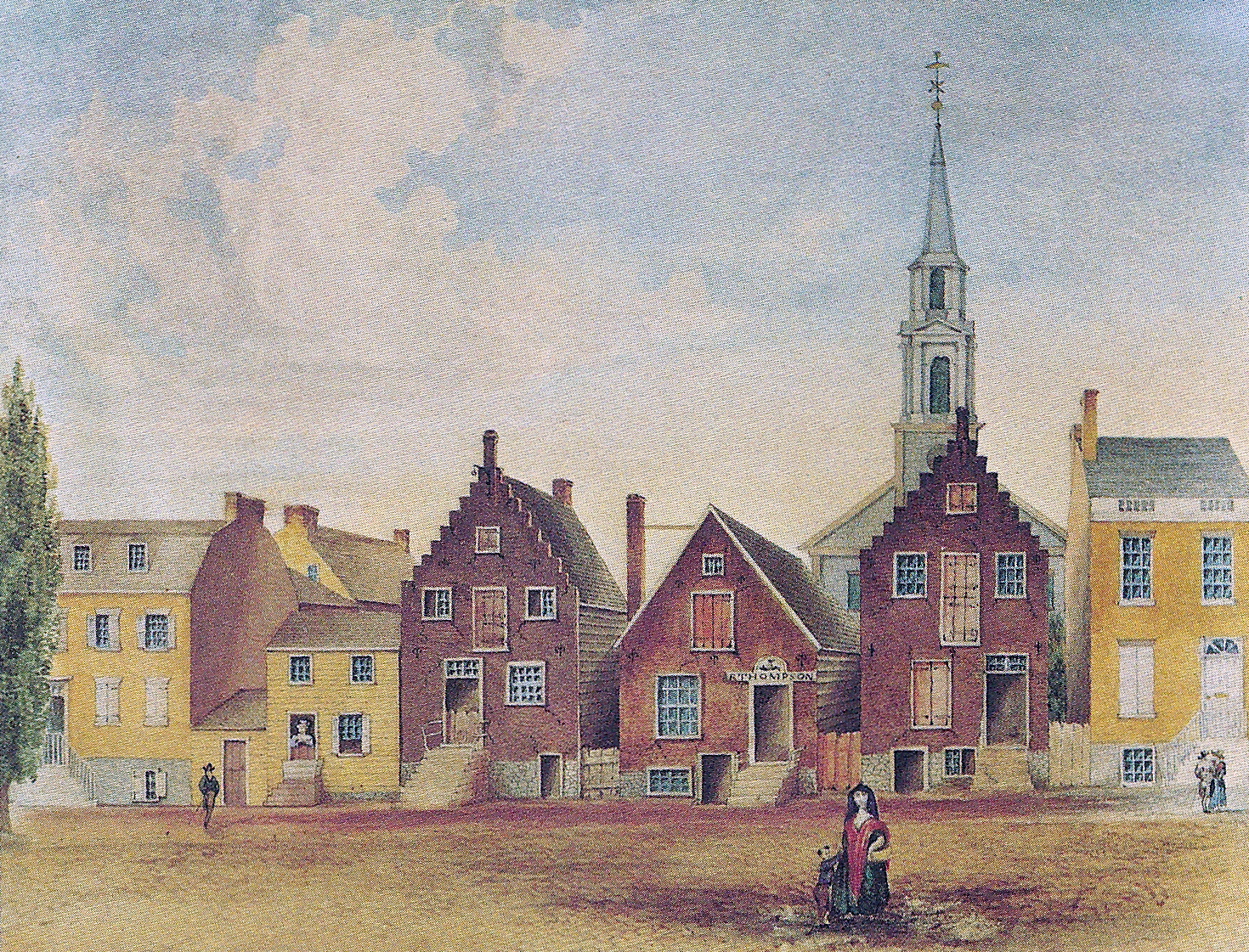
North Pearl Street from Maiden Lane North a c. 1805 portrait by James Eights

The Hudson River area was originally inhabited by Algonquian-speaking Mohicans, who called it Pempotowwuthut-Muhhcanneuw, meaning "the fireplace of the Mohican nation". Based to the west along the Mohawk River, the Iroquoian-speaking Mohawk called it skahnéhtati, also transliterated to Sche-negh-ta-da, "through the pine woods", referring to the path they took there. (Note: This name would later be adopted by the city of Schenectady, to the west.)

According to Hendrick Aupaumut, the Mohicans came to the area from the north and the west. They settled along the Mahicannituck River, which is now called the Hudson River, and called themselves the Muh-he-con-neok, the "People of the Waters That Are Never Still".

The Mohawks, one of the Five Nations of the Haudenosaunee Confederacy, were based in the Mohawk valley and noted for their fur trading and their access to trade between the Haudenosaunee and other nations. The Mohawk became strong trading partners with the Dutch and English. It is likely that the area was visited by European fur traders perhaps as early as 1540, but the extent and duration of those visits are unclear.

Permanent European claims began when Englishman Henry Hudson, exploring for the Dutch East India Company on the Half Moon (Dutch: Halve Maen), reached the area in 1609, claiming it for the United Netherlands. In 1614, Hendrick Christiaensen built Fort Nassau on Castle Island (now called Port of Albany), in the Hudson River. The fort acted as a fur-trading post and was the first documented European structure in present-day Albany. Commencement of the fur trade provoked hostility from the French colony in Canada and among the natives, all of whom vied to control the trade. In 1618, a flood ruined Fort Nassau, but the Dutch replaced it with Fort Orange on the mainland in 1624. Both forts were named in honor of the leading family of the Dutch Revolt, members of the House of Orange-Nassau. Fort Orange and the surrounding area were incorporated as the village of Beverwijck (English: Beaverwick or Beaver District) in 1652, and the city of Albany in 1686. In these early decades of trade, the Dutch, Mohican, and Mohawk developed relations that reflected differences among their three cultures.

=== British rule to 1800 ===
Albany is one of the oldest surviving European settlements from the original Thirteen Colonies and the longest continuously chartered city in the United States. (Note: The Dongan Charter incorporated Albany three months after New York City's charter was ratified. However, the latter forfeited its charter during Leisler's Rebellion, making Albany's the oldest effective charter in the country.) When New Netherland was captured by the English in 1664, the name was changed from Beverwijck to Albany in honor of Prince James, Duke of Albany (later King James VII/II). (Note: James Stuart, brother and successor of Charles II, was both the Duke of York and Duke of Albany before being crowned king in 1685. His title of Duke of York is also the source of the name of the province of New York.) Duke of Albany was a Scottish title given since 1398, generally to a younger son of the King of Scots. The name is ultimately derived from Alba, the Gaelic name for Scotland. The Dutch briefly regained Albany in August 1673 and renamed the city Willemstadt; the English took permanent possession in 1674 with the Treaty of Westminster. On November 1, 1683, the Province of New York was split into counties, with Albany County being the largest: it included all of present New York State north of Dutchess and Ulster Counties in addition to present-day Bennington County, Vermont, theoretically stretching west to the Pacific Ocean; Albany became the county seat. Albany was formally chartered as a municipality by provincial Governor Thomas Dongan on July 22, 1686. The Dongan Charter was virtually identical in content to the charter awarded to the city of New York three months earlier. Dongan created Albany as a strip of land 1 mile (1.6 km) wide and 16 miles (26 km) long. Over the years Albany would lose much of the land to the west and annex land to the north and south. At this point, Albany had a population of about 500 people.

==== Plan of Union ====
In 1754, representatives of seven British North American colonies met in the Stadt Huys, Albany's city hall, for the Albany Congress; Benjamin Franklin of Pennsylvania presented the Albany Plan of Union there, which was the first formal proposal to unite the colonies. Although it was never adopted by Parliament, it was an important precursor to the United States Constitution. (Note: The Plan of Union's original intention was to unite the colonies in defense against aggressions of the French to the north; it was not an attempt to become independent from the British crown.) The same year, the French and Indian War, the fourth in a series of wars dating back to 1689, began. It ended in 1763 with French defeat, resolving a situation that had been a constant threat to Albany and held back its growth.

==== Revolutionary War and real estate ====
A view of Albany published in 1789

In 1775, with the colonies in the midst of the Revolutionary War, the Stadt Huys became home to the Albany Committee of Correspondence (the political arm of the local revolutionary movement), which took over operation of Albany's government and eventually expanded its power to control all of Albany County. Tories and prisoners of war were often jailed in the Stadt Huys alongside common criminals. In 1776, Albany native Philip Livingston signed the Declaration of Independence.

During and after the Revolutionary War, Albany County saw a great increase in real estate transactions. After the 1777 colonial victory at the Battle of Saratoga, the upper Hudson Valley was generally at peace as the war raged on elsewhere. Prosperity was soon seen all over Upstate New York. Migrants from Vermont and Connecticut began flowing in, noting the advantages of living on the Hudson and trading at Albany, while being only a few days' sail from New York City. Albany reported a population of 3,498 in the first national census in 1790, an increase of almost 700% since its chartering.

==== Early decades of American independence ====
On November 17, 1793, fire broke out at a stable belonging to Leonard Gansevoort, destroying 26 homes on Broadway, Maiden Lane, James Street, and State Street. Three were arrested and charged with arson: Pompey, a man belonging to Matthew Visscher; Dinah, a 14-year-old girl belonging to Volkert P. Douw; and Bet, a 12-year-old girl belonging to Philip S. Van Rensselaer. On January 6, 1794, the three were sentenced to death. Governor George Clinton issued a temporary stay of execution, but Dinah and Bet were executed by hanging on March 14, and Pompey on April 11, 1794.

In 1797, the state capital was moved permanently to Albany. From statehood to this date, the Legislature had frequently moved the state capital between Albany, Kingston, Poughkeepsie, and the city of New York. Albany is the tenth-oldest state capital in the United States and the second-oldest city that is a state capital, after Santa Fe, New Mexico.

=== 1800 to 1942 ===
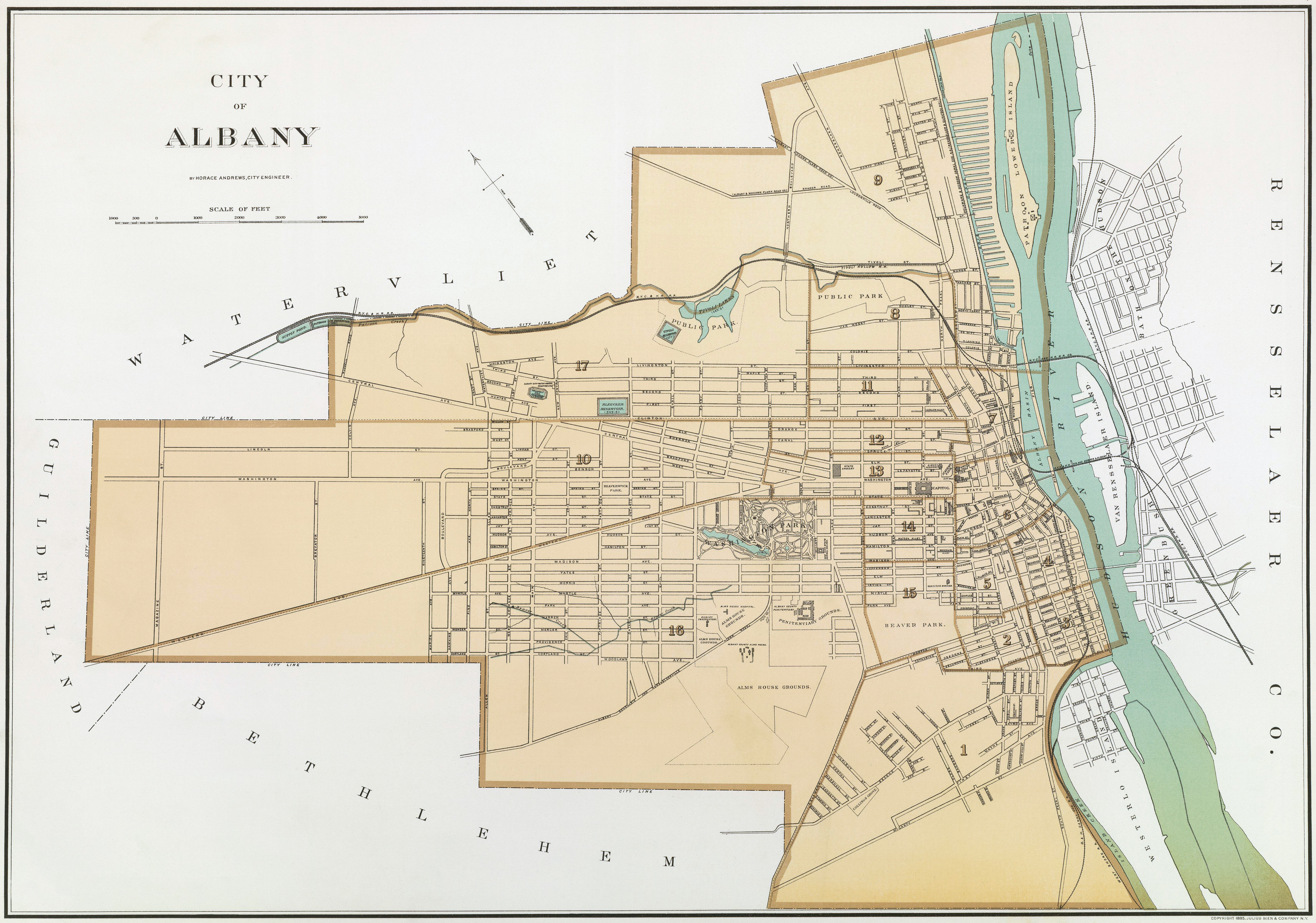
This 1895 map of Albany shows the gridded block system as it expanded around the former turnpikes.

Albany has been a center of transportation for much of its history. In the late 18th and early 19th centuries, Albany saw development of the turnpike and by 1815, Albany was the turnpike center of the state. The development of Simeon De Witt's gridded block system in 1794—which renamed streets that had originally named after the British royal family with names of birds and mammals instead (Note: A rough grid pattern was established in 1764, aligning the streets with Clinton Avenue, which marked the northern border of Albany at the time. Patroon of the Manor of Rensselaerswyck Stephen Van Rensselaer II followed the same directional system north of Clinton Avenue on his lands; however, the two systems were not related otherwise, which is why cross streets north and south of Clinton Avenue do not align. The stockade surrounding the city was taken down shortly before the Revolutionary War, allowing for expansion. De Witt, city surveyor at the time, continued the grid pattern to the west and renamed on his 1794 map any streets named after the British royal family. Hawk Street is the only road that retained its original name; the rest were renamed after birds and mammals.)—was intersected by these major arterials coming out of Albany, cutting through the city at unexpected angles. The construction of the turnpike, in conjunction with canal and railroad systems, made Albany the hub of transportation for pioneers going to Buffalo and the Michigan Territory in the early and mid-19th century.

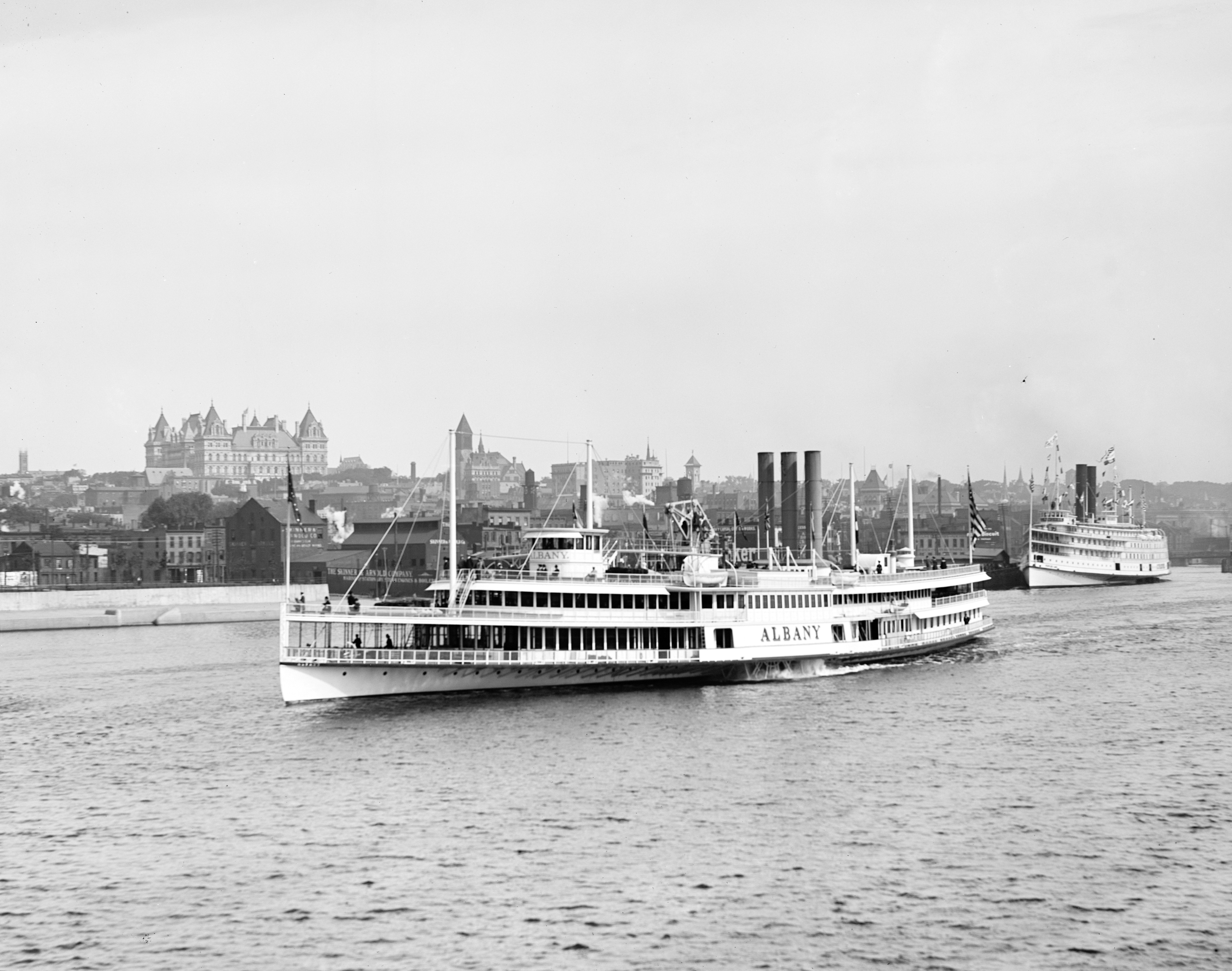
The steamer Albany departs for New York City; at the height of steam travel in 1884. 1.5 million passengers took the trip.

In 1807, Robert Fulton initiated a steamboat line from New York City to Albany, the first successful enterprise of its kind anywhere in the world. By 1810, with 10,763 people, Albany was the tenth-largest urban place in the nation. The town and village north of Albany known as "the Colonie" (Note: "The Colonie" made up the current area of Arbor Hill and was the more urban part of the Manor of Rensselaerswyck, which surrounded Albany. It is the source of the name of the current town and village of Colonie. Though retaining the original Dutch spelling, the municipality retains a unique pronunciation—/ˌkɒləˈniː/—that even a preeminent Beverwijck historian can not explain.) was annexed in 1815. In 1825 the Erie Canal was completed, forming a continuous water route from the Great Lakes to New York City. Unlike the current Barge Canal, which ends at nearby Waterford, the original Erie Canal ended at Albany; Lock 1 was north of Colonie Street. The Canal emptied into a 32-acre (13 ha) man-made lagoon called the Albany Basin, which was Albany's main port from 1825 until the Port of Albany-Rensselaer opened in 1932. In 1829, while working as a professor at the Albany Academy, Joseph Henry, widely regarded as "the foremost American scientist of the 19th century", built the first electric motor. Three years later, he discovered electromagnetic self-induction (the SI unit for which is now the henry). He went on to be the first Secretary of the Smithsonian Institution. In the 1830 and 1840 censuses, Albany was ranked as the ninth-largest urban place in the nation; it dropped back to tenth in 1850. This was the last time the city was one of the top ten largest urban places in the nation.

Albany also has significant history with rail transport, as the location of two major regional railroad headquarters. The Delaware and Hudson Railway was headquartered in Albany at what is now the SUNY System Administration Building. In 1853, Erastus Corning, a noted industrialist and Albany's mayor from 1834 to 1837, consolidated ten railroads stretching from Albany to Buffalo into the New York Central Railroad (NYCRR), headquartered in Albany until Cornelius Vanderbilt moved it to New York City in 1867. One of the ten companies that formed the NYCRR was the Mohawk and Hudson Railroad, which was the first railroad in the state and the first successful steam railroad running regularly scheduled service in the country.

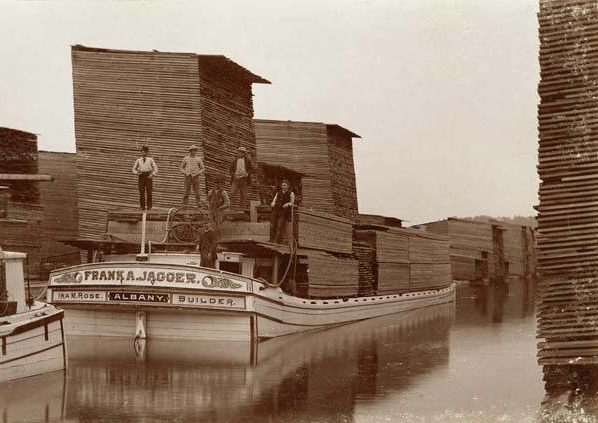
The Albany Lumber District was home to the largest lumber market in the nation in 1865.

While the key to Albany's economic prosperity in the 19th century was transportation, industry and business also played a role. Largely thanks to the city's Dutch and German roots, beer was one of its biggest commodities. Beverwyck Brewery, originally known as Quinn and Nolan (Nolan being mayor of Albany 1878–1883), was the last remaining brewer from that time when it closed in 1972. The city's location at the east end of the Erie Canal gave it unparalleled access to both raw products and a captive customer base in the west. Albany was known for its publishing houses, and to some extent, still is. Albany was second only to Boston in the number of books produced for most of the 19th century. Iron foundries in both the north and south ends of the city attracted thousands of immigrants to the city for industrial jobs. Intricate wrought-iron details constructed in those years remain visible on what are now historic buildings. The iron industry waned by the 1890s due to increased costs associated with a newly unionized workforce and the opening of mines in the Mesabi Range in Minnesota.

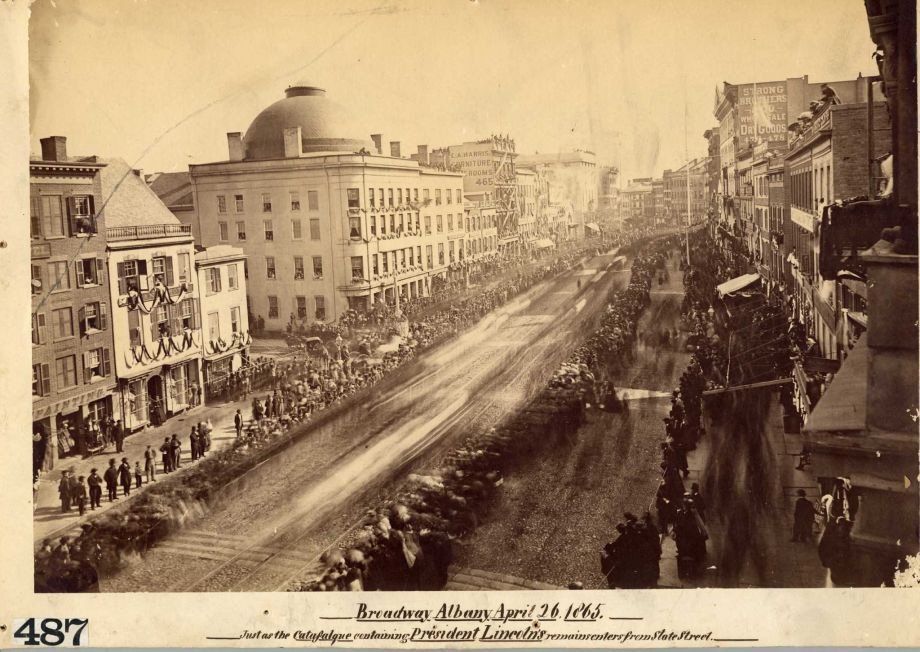
Broadway in Albany during the funeral ceremonies for Abraham Lincoln (1865)

Albany's other major exports during the 18th and 19th centuries were furs, wheat, meat, and lumber. By 1865, there were almost 4,000 saw mills in the Albany area and the Albany Lumber District was the largest lumber market in the nation. The city was also home to a number of banks. The Bank of Albany (1792–1861) was the second chartered bank in New York. The city was the original home of the Albank (founded in 1820 as the Albany Savings Bank), KeyBank (founded in 1825 as the Commercial Bank of Albany), and Norstar Bank (founded as the State Bank of Albany in 1803). American Express was founded in Albany in 1850 as an express mail business. In 1871, the northwestern portion of Albany—west from Magazine Street—was annexed to the neighboring town of Guilderland after the town of Watervliet refused annexation of the territory. In return for this loss, portions of Bethlehem and Watervliet were added to Albany. Part of the land annexed to Guilderland was ceded back to Albany in 1910, setting up the current western border.

The train carrying the body of slain President Abraham Lincoln came through Albany on the way to Illinois and the ghostly image of that train remains.

Albany opened one of the first commercial airports in the world, and the first municipal airport in the United States, in 1908. Originally on a polo field on Loudon Road, it moved to Westerlo Island in 1909 and remained there until 1928. The Albany Municipal Airport—jointly owned by the city and county—was moved to its current location in Colonie in 1928. By 1916 Albany's northern and southern borders reached their modern courses; Westerlo Island, to the south, became the second-to-last annexation, which occurred in 1926.

=== 1942 to present day ===
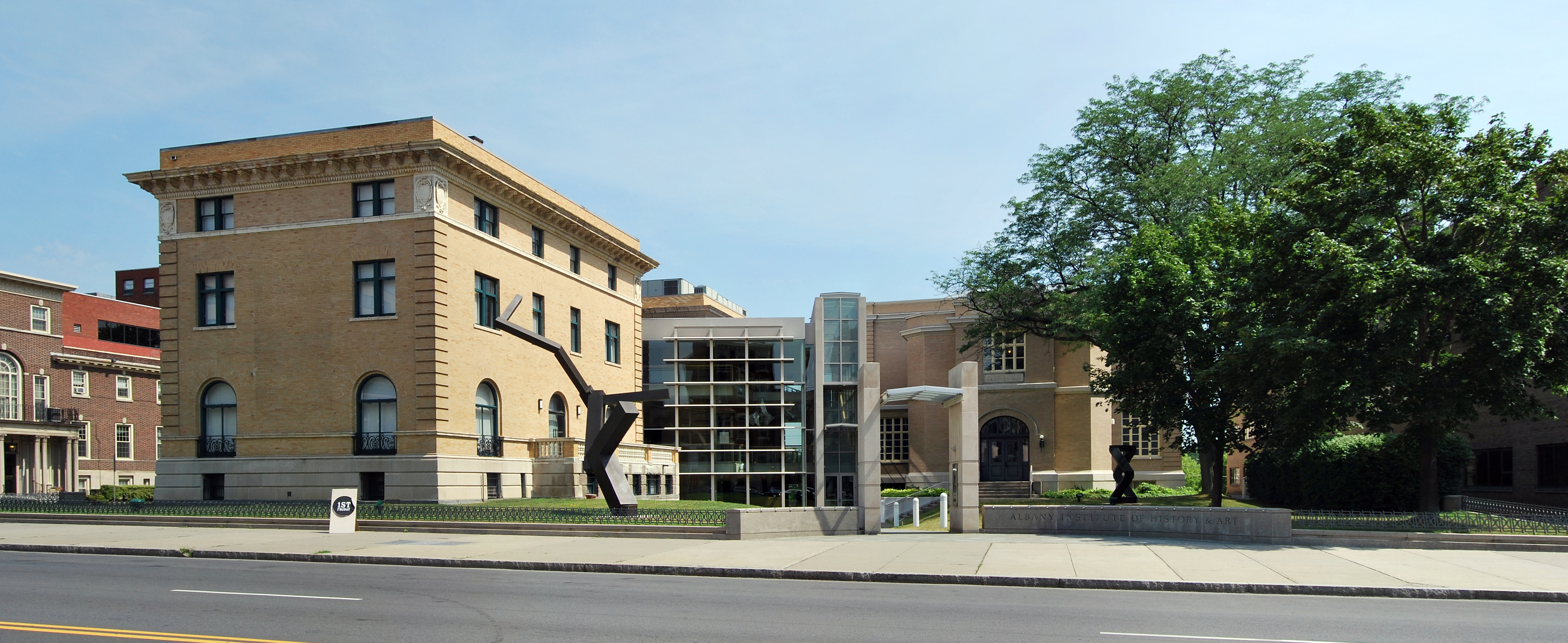
Albany Institute of History & Art

Erastus Corning 2nd, arguably Albany's most notable mayor (and great-grandson of the former mayor of the same name), was elected in 1941. Although he was one of the longest-serving mayors of any city in United States history (1942 until his death in 1983), one historian describes Corning's tenure as "long on years, short on accomplishments," citing Corning's preference for maintaining the status quo as a factor that held back potential progress during his tenure. While Corning brought stability to the office of mayor, it is said even those who admire him greatly cannot come up with a sizable list of "major concrete Corning achievements." Corning is given credit for saving—albeit somewhat unintentionally—much of Albany's historic architecture. (Note: Grondahl summarizes it as, "This hard-line position of isolationism on the part of the machine was a curse economically – but a strange blessing unintentionally in architectural terms. While downtown went to seed and plans for large-scale construction and improvements came to a virtual standstill in Albany without federal money, pockets of the city's historic housing stock escaped the wrecking ball.")

During the 1950s and 1960s, a time when federal aid for urban renewal was plentiful, Albany did not have growth in its economy or infrastructure. It lost more than 20 percent of its population during the Corning years, as people moved to newer housing in the suburbs, followed by most of the downtown businesses moving there as well. While cities across the country grappled with similar issues, the problems were magnified in Albany: interference from the Democratic political machine hindered progress considerably. In 1960, the mayor sold the city's stake in the airport to the county, citing budget issues. It was known from then on as Albany County Airport until a massive upgrade and modernization project between 1996 and 1998, when it was rebranded Albany International Airport. (Note: Albany International Airport is the public-facing brand of the Albany County Airport, which remains overseen by the Albany County Airport Authority.)

Governor Nelson Rockefeller (1959–1973) (R) tried to stimulate the city with new monumental architecture and large, government-sponsored building projects; he drove construction of the Empire State Plaza, SUNY Albany's uptown campus, and much of the W. Averell Harriman State Office Building Campus. Albany County Republican Chairman Joseph C. Frangella once quipped, "Governor Rockefeller was the best mayor Albany ever had." Corning, although opposed to the project, was responsible for negotiating the payment plan for the Empire State Plaza. Rockefeller did not want to be limited by the Legislature's power of the purse, so Corning devised a plan to have the county pay for the construction and have the state sign a lease-ownership agreement. The state paid off the bonds until 2004. It was Rockefeller's only viable option, and he agreed. Due to the clout Corning gained from the situation, he gained inclusion of the State Museum, a convention center, and a restaurant, back in the plans—ideas which Rockefeller had originally vetoed. The county gained $35 million in fees and the city received $13 million for lost tax revenue. Having the state offices in the city enabled it to keep good jobs and retain middle-class residents.

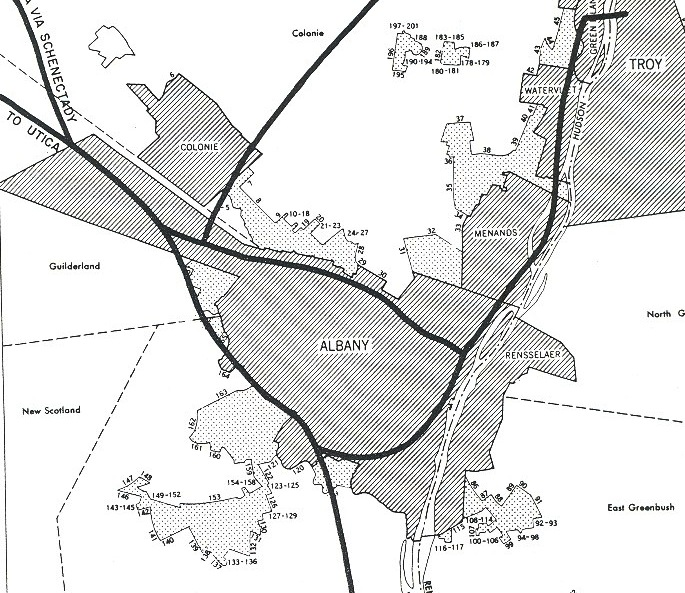
This 1955 map shows the planned expansion of the Interstate Highway System around Albany.

Another major project of the 1960s and 1970s was the construction of Interstate 787 and the South Mall Arterial. (Note: The Empire State Plaza was originally known as the South Mall; the South Mall Arterial is the only remnant of that naming scheme.) Construction began in the early 1960s. A proposed Mid-Crosstown Arterial never came to fruition. One of the project's main results was separating the city from the Hudson River. Historian Paul Grondahl has described Corning as shortsighted with respect to use of the waterfront, saying the mayor could have used his influence to change the location of I-787, which now cuts the city off from "its whole raison d'être" In 1967, the hamlet of Karlsfeld was the last annexation by the city, sourced from the Town of Bethlehem.

When Corning died in 1983, Thomas Whalen assumed the mayorship and was reelected twice. He encouraged redevelopment of historic structures and helped attract federal dollars earmarked for that purpose. What Corning had saved from destruction, Whalen refurbished for continued and new uses. The Mayor's Office of Special Events was created in an effort to increase the number of festivals and artistic events in the city, including a year-long Dongan Charter tricentennial celebration in 1986. Whalen is credited for an "unparalleled cycle of commercial investment and development" in Albany due to his "aggressive business development programs".

Prior to the recession of the 1990s, downtown Albany was home to four Fortune 500 companies. After the death of Corning and the retirement of Congressman Sam Stratton, the political environment changed. Long-term office holders became rare in the 1980s. Local media began following the drama surrounding county politics (specifically that of the newly created county executive position); the loss of Corning (and eventually the machine) led to a lack of interest in city politics. The election of Gerald Jennings was a surprise, and he served as mayor from 1994 until his retirement at the end of 2013. His tenure essentially ended the political machine that had been in place since the 1920s.

During the 1990s, the State Legislature approved the $234 million "Albany Plan", "a building and renovation project [that] was the most ambitious building project to affect the area since the Rockefeller era." Under the Albany Plan, renovation and new building projects were initiated around the downtown area. Many state workers were relocated from the Harriman State Office Campus to downtown, helping its retail businesses and vitality. The first decade of the 21st century saw a real possibility for a long-discussed and controversial Albany Convention Center; it opened in 2017 with the goal of making Albany a viable location for large events hosted by statewide organizations.

Albany remains an important location for business presence, given its role as de facto seat of Tech Valley and being home to the state capitol. Fortune 500 companies with offices in Albany include American Express, J.P. Morgan and Chase, Merrill Lynch, General Electric, Verizon, Goldman Sachs, International Paper, and Key Bank.

Albany won the All-America City Award in both 1991 and 2009.

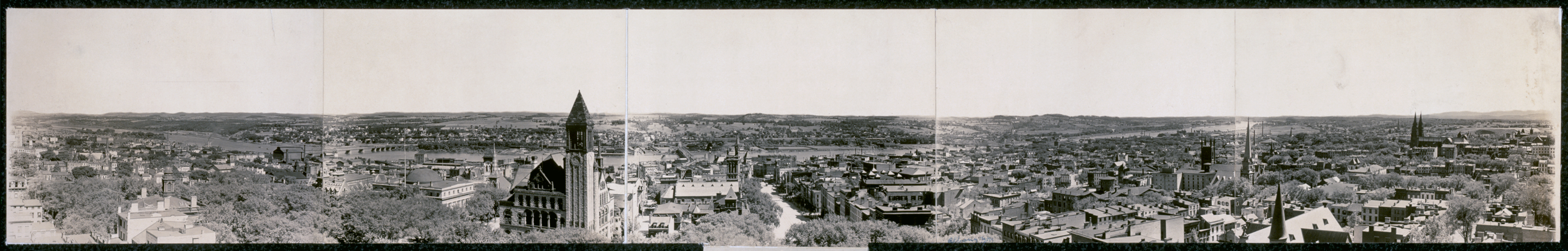
Albany, as viewed from the Capitol looking southeast, c. 1906. City Hall is left of center; the twin spires of the Immaculate Conception church can be seen on the far right; the future Empire State Plaza is located at the extreme right of the image.

== Geography ==
Albany is about 135 miles (217 km) north of New York City on the Hudson River. It has a total area of 21.8 square miles (56 km^{2}), of which 21.4 square miles (55 km^{2}) is land and 0.4 square miles (1.0 km^{2}) (1.8%) is water. The city is bordered on the north by the town of Colonie (along with the village of Menands), on the west by the town of Guilderland, and on the south by the town of Bethlehem. The former Foxes Creek, Beaver Kill, and Rutten Kill were diverted underground in the 19th century. There are four lakes within city limits: Buckingham Lake; Rensselaer Lake at the mouth of the Patroon Creek; Tivoli Lake, which was formed as a reservoir and once connected to the Patroon Creek; and Washington Park Lake, which was formed by damming the Beaver Kill.

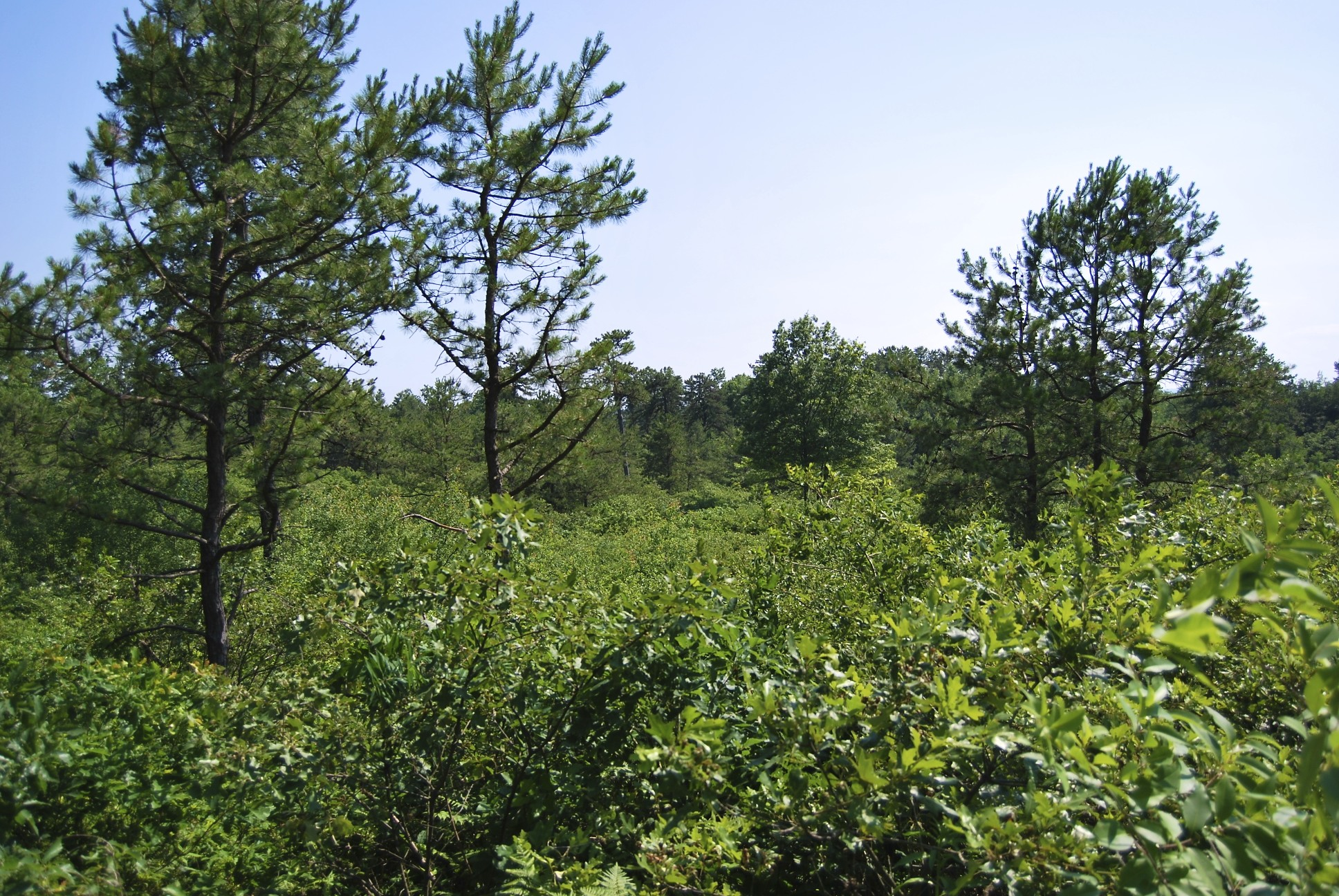
The Albany Pine Bush is the only sizable inland pine barrens sand dune ecosystem in the United States.

The highest natural point in Albany is a USGS benchmark near the Loudonville Reservoir off Birch Hill Road, at 378 feet (115 m) above sea level. The lowest point is at the Hudson River—which is still technically an estuary at Albany and is affected by the Atlantic tide—at an average of 2 feet (0.61 m) above sea level at low tide and 4 feet (1.2 m) at high tide. The interior of Albany consists of rolling hills which were once part of the Albany Pine Bush, an area of pitch pine and scrub oak, and has arid, sandy soil that is a remnant of the ancient Lake Albany. Due to development, the Pine Bush has shrunk from an original 25,000 to 6,000 acres (10,100 to 2,400 ha) today. A preserve was set up by the State Legislature in 1988 and is on the city's western edge, spilling into Guilderland and Colonie; it is the only sizable inland pine barrens sand dune ecosystem in the United States, and is home to many endangered species, including the Karner Blue butterfly.

=== Climate ===
Albany is in the humid continental climate zone (Köppen climate classification: Dfa), and features cold, snowy winters, and hot, humid summers; the city experiences four distinct seasons. Albany is in plant hardiness zone 6a near downtown and along the shore of the Hudson and 5b at its western end. Albany receives 40.7 inches (1,030 mm) of precipitation per year, with 138 days of at least 0.01 in (0.25 mm) of precipitation each year. Snowfall is significant, totaling 59.4 inches (151 cm) per season, but with less accumulation than the lake effect areas to the north and west, as it is farther from Lake Ontario. However, Albany is close enough to the Atlantic coast to receive heavy snow from Nor'easters and the city occasionally receives Alberta clippers. Winters can be very cold with fluctuating conditions; temperatures drop to 0 °F (−18 °C) or below on nine nights per annum. Summers in Albany can contain stretches of excessive heat and humidity, with temperatures of 90 °F (32 °C) or hotter on nine days per year. Record temperature extremes range from −28 °F (−33 °C), on January 19, 1971, to 104 °F (40 °C) on July 4, 1911.

Climate data for Albany International Airport, New York (1991–2020 normals, (Note: Mean monthly maxima and minima (i.e. the expected highest and lowest temperature readings at any point during the year or given month) calculated based on data at said location from 1991 to 2020.) extremes 1874–present (Note: Official records for Albany kept January 1874 to May 1938 at downtown and at Albany Int'l since June 1938. For more information, see Threadex))
Month	Jan	Feb	Mar	Apr	May	Jun	Jul	Aug	Sep	Oct	Nov	Dec	Year
Record high °F (°C)	71 (22)	74 (23)	89 (32)	93 (34)	97 (36)	100 (38)	104 (40)	102 (39)	100 (38)	91 (33)	82 (28)	72 (22)	104 (40)
Mean maximum °F (°C)	54.5 (12.5)	54.5 (12.5)	65.9 (18.8)	80.9 (27.2)	87.8 (31.0)	92.0 (33.3)	92.7 (33.7)	90.6 (32.6)	87.0 (30.6)	77.8 (25.4)	67.7 (19.8)	56.4 (13.6)	94.5 (34.7)
Mean daily maximum °F (°C)	32.8 (0.4)	36.0 (2.2)	45.3 (7.4)	59.2 (15.1)	71.2 (21.8)	79.4 (26.3)	83.9 (28.8)	82.0 (27.8)	74.4 (23.6)	61.6 (16.4)	49.3 (9.6)	38.2 (3.4)	59.4 (15.2)
Daily mean °F (°C)	24.4 (−4.2)	26.8 (−2.9)	35.7 (2.1)	48.1 (8.9)	59.6 (15.3)	68.4 (20.2)	73.1 (22.8)	71.4 (21.9)	63.5 (17.5)	51.4 (10.8)	40.5 (4.7)	30.4 (−0.9)	49.4 (9.7)
Mean daily minimum °F (°C)	15.9 (−8.9)	17.6 (−8.0)	26.1 (−3.3)	36.9 (2.7)	48.1 (8.9)	57.4 (14.1)	62.4 (16.9)	60.7 (15.9)	52.6 (11.4)	41.1 (5.1)	31.6 (−0.2)	22.7 (−5.2)	39.4 (4.1)
Mean minimum °F (°C)	−6.0 (−21.1)	−2.4 (−19.1)	7.8 (−13.4)	23.7 (−4.6)	33.8 (1.0)	43.3 (6.3)	51.5 (10.8)	48.9 (9.4)	37.6 (3.1)	27.0 (−2.8)	16.0 (−8.9)	4.6 (−15.2)	−8.4 (−22.4)
Record low °F (°C)	−28 (−33)	−22 (−30)	−21 (−29)	9 (−13)	26 (−3)	35 (2)	40 (4)	34 (1)	24 (−4)	16 (−9)	−11 (−24)	−22 (−30)	−28 (−33)
Average precipitation inches (mm)	2.60 (66)	2.28 (58)	3.09 (78)	3.11 (79)	3.41 (87)	4.05 (103)	4.55 (116)	3.76 (96)	3.73 (95)	3.85 (98)	2.99 (76)	3.26 (83)	40.68 (1,033)
Average snowfall inches (cm)	15.6 (40)	13.7 (35)	12.0 (30)	1.6 (4.1)	0.1 (0.25)	0.0 (0.0)	0.0 (0.0)	0.0 (0.0)	0.0 (0.0)	0.3 (0.76)	2.6 (6.6)	13.3 (34)	59.2 (150)
Average extreme snow depth inches (cm)	8.3 (21)	8.3 (21)	8.0 (20)	1.1 (2.8)	0.0 (0.0)	0.0 (0.0)	0.0 (0.0)	0.0 (0.0)	0.0 (0.0)	0.2 (0.51)	1.3 (3.3)	7.0 (18)	13.6 (35)
Average precipitation days (≥ 0.01 in)	12.7	10.6	11.8	12.2	12.7	12.2	11.4	11.0	9.7	11.2	11.1	12.6	139.2
Average snowy days (≥ 0.1 in)	10.1	7.8	5.7	1.3	0.0	0.0	0.0	0.0	0.0	0.2	2.4	7.0	34.5
Average relative humidity (%)	71.1	68.5	64.8	61.2	65.5	69.5	70.5	74.1	75.7	72.4	73.1	73.9	70.0
Average dew point °F (°C)	12.9 (−10.6)	14.5 (−9.7)	22.6 (−5.2)	32.2 (0.1)	45.0 (7.2)	55.0 (12.8)	60.3 (15.7)	59.4 (15.2)	52.3 (11.3)	40.3 (4.6)	31.1 (−0.5)	19.4 (−7.0)	37.1 (2.8)
Mean monthly sunshine hours	141.1	158.5	200.3	218.9	248.9	262.2	289.2	253.2	210.5	168.8	108.3	100.7	2,360.6
Percentage possible sunshine	48	54	54	54	55	57	62	59	56	49	38	34	53
Average ultraviolet index	1	2	4	5	7	8	8	7	6	3	2	1	5
Source 1: NOAA (relative humidity, dew point, and sun 1961–1990)
Source 2: Weather Atlas

=== Cityscape ===
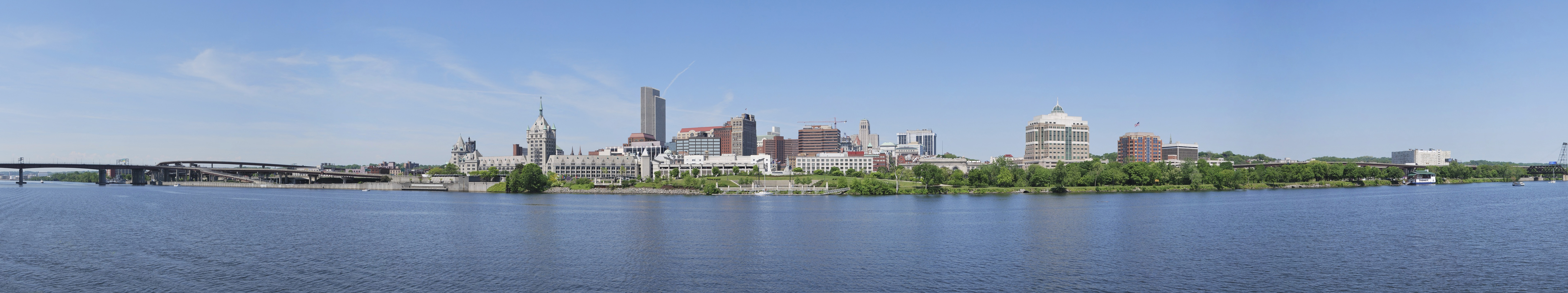
Panorama of Albany and the Hudson River from Rensselaer, looking southwest

==== Neighborhoods ====
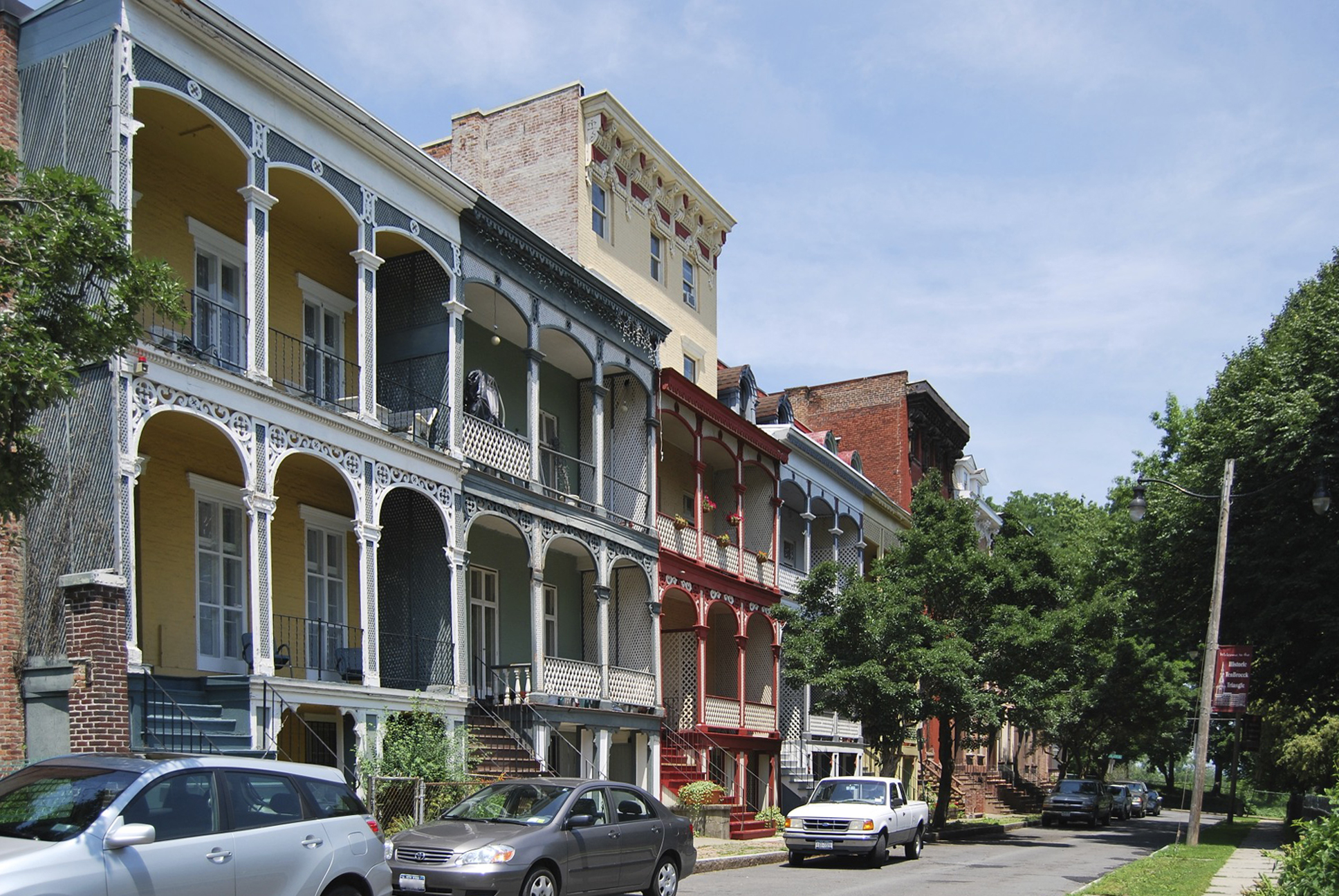
Housing in Ten Broeck Triangle, a subset of the Arbor Hill neighborhood

Due to the variety of its communities, Albany is often called a "city of neighborhoods." The neighborhoods of Albany include Arbor Hill; Center Square, "[an] eclectic mix of residential and commercial [buildings], including bars, night clubs, restaurants, and stores"; Pine Hills; and the South End.

== Demographics ==
Historical population
Census	Pop.	Note	%±
1790	3,498		—
1800	5,349		52.9%
1810	10,762		101.2%
1820	12,630		17.4%
1830	24,209		91.7%
1840	33,721		39.3%
1850	50,763		50.5%
1860	62,367		22.9%
1870	69,422		11.3%
1880	90,758		30.7%
1890	94,923		4.6%
1900	94,151		−0.8%
1910	100,253		6.5%
1920	113,344		13.1%
1930	127,412		12.4%
1940	130,577		2.5%
1950	134,995		3.4%
1960	129,726		−3.9%
1970	115,781		−10.7%
1980	101,727		−12.1%
1990	101,082		−0.6%
2000	95,658		−5.4%
2010	97,856		2.3%
2020	99,224		1.4%
2026 (est.)	102,305		3.1%
Sources: 1790–1950, 1960–1980, 1990–2000; 2010–2020

=== Racial and ethnic composition ===
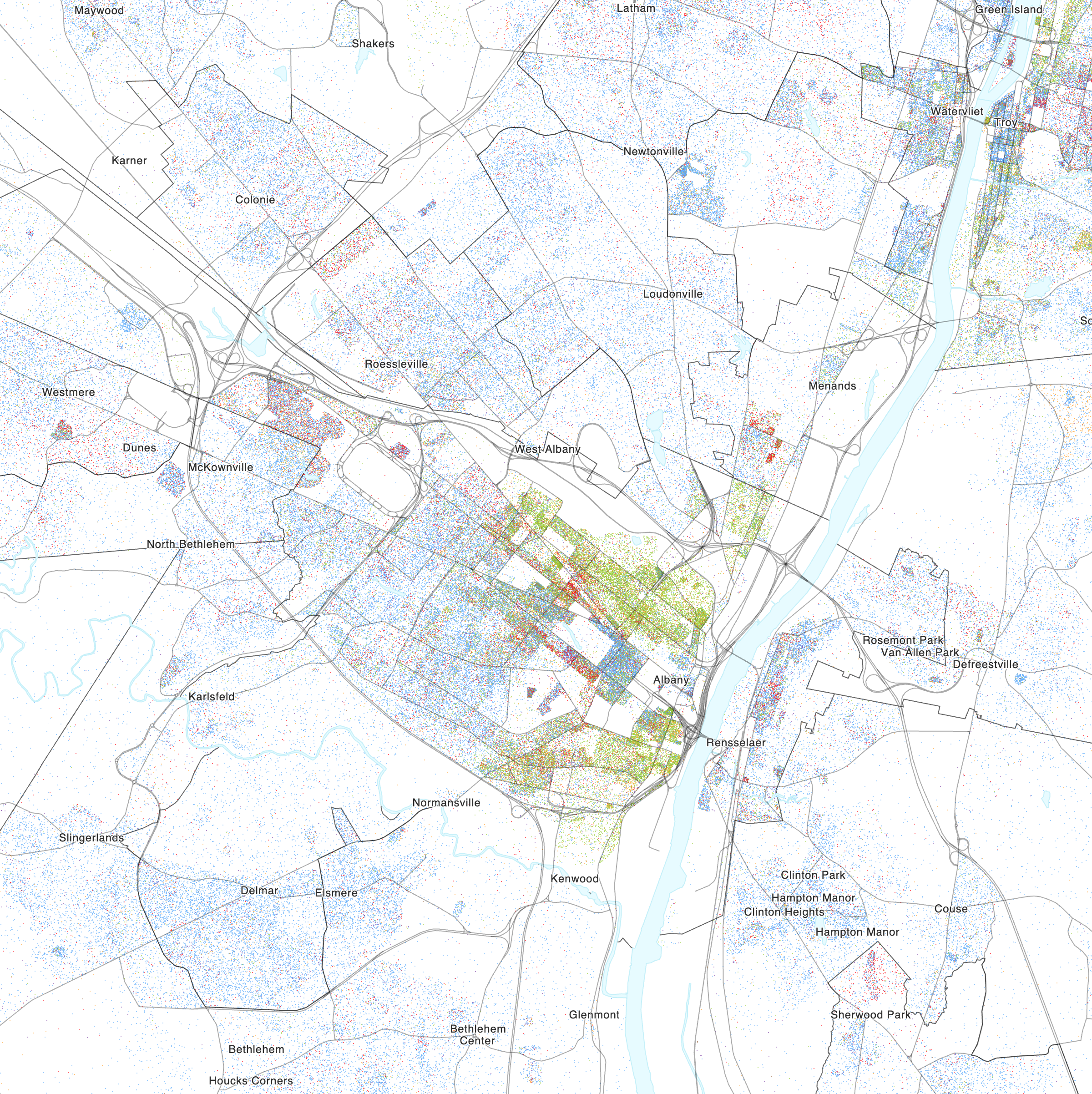
Map of racial distribution in Albany, 2020 U.S. census. Each dot is one person: ⬤ White ⬤ Black ⬤ Asian ⬤ Hispanic ⬤ Multiracial ⬤ Native American/Other

Albany city, New York – Racial and ethnic composition Note: the US Census treats Hispanic/Latino as an ethnic category. This table excludes Latinos from the racial categories and assigns them to a separate category. Hispanics/Latinos may be of any race.
Race / Ethnicity (NH = Non-Hispanic)	Pop 2000	Pop 2010	Pop 2020	% 2000	% 2010	% 2020
White alone (NH)	58,459	52,857	44,392	61.11%	54.02%	44.74%
Black or African American alone (NH)	26,042	28,479	29,222	27.22%	29.10%	29.45%
Native American or Alaska Native alone (NH)	233	191	241	0.24%	0.20%	0.24%
Asian alone (NH)	3,089	4,850	7,949	3.23%	4.96%	8.01%
Native Hawaiian or Pacific Islander alone (NH)	27	47	66	0.03%	0.05%	0.07%
Other race alone (NH)	217	296	871	0.23%	0.30%	0.88%
Mixed race or Multiracial (NH)	2,242	2,740	4,942	2.34%	2.80%	4.98%
Hispanic or Latino (any race)	5,349	8,396	11,541	5.59%	8.58%	11.63%
Total	95,658	97,856	99,224	100.00%	100.00%	100.00%

=== City of immigrants ===
Historically, Albany's population has been mixed. First dominated by Mohican and Mohawk people, then Dutch and Germans, it was overtaken by the British in the early 19th century. Irish immigrants soon outnumbered most other ethnicities by the mid-19th century, and were followed by Italians and Poles. In the mid-to-late 20th century, the African-American population increased with thousands of people from the rural South, as part of the Great Migration. As historian (and Albany Assemblyman) John McEneny puts it,

Dutch and Yankee, German and Irish, Polish and Italian, Black and Chinese—over the centuries Albany's heritage has reflected a succession of immigrant nationalities. Its streets have echoed with a dozen languages, its neighborhoods adapting to the distinctive life-style and changing economic fortunes of each new group.

Until after the Revolution, Albany's population consisted mostly of ethnic Dutch descendants. Settlers migrating from New England tipped the balance toward British ethnicity in the early 19th century. Jobs on the turnpikes, canals, and railroads attracted floods of Irish immigrants in the early 19th century, especially in the 1840s during the Great Famine, solidifying the city's Irish base. Michael Nolan became Albany's first Irish Catholic mayor in 1878, two years before Boston. Polish and Italian immigrants began arriving in Albany in the wave of immigration in the latter part of the 19th century. Their numbers were smaller than in many other eastern cities mainly because most had found manufacturing jobs at General Electric in Schenectady. The Jewish community had been established early, with Sephardic Jewish members as part of the Beverwijck community. Its population rose during the late 19th century, when many Ashkenazi Jews immigrated from eastern Europe. In that period, there was also an influx of Chinese and east Asian immigrants, who settled in the downtown section of the city. Many of their descendants have since moved to suburban areas. Asian immigration all but halted after the Immigration Act of 1924.

Albany saw its last large immigration pattern as part of the Great Migration when many African Americans moved there from the American South before and after World War I to fill industrial positions and find other opportunities. In the early years, African-Americans lived together with Italians, Jews, and other immigrants in the South End, where housing was older and less expensive. The black community has grown as a proportion of the population since then; African Americans made up three percent of the city's population in 1950, six percent in 1960, 12 percent in 1970, and 30 percent in 2010. The change in proportion is related mostly to middle-class white families moving to the suburbs and black families remaining within city limits during the same time period.

Since 2007, the number of Burmese refugees to Albany has increased. The Burmese refugee community consists mostly of people of Karen ethnicity. An estimated 5,000 Burmese refugees reside in Albany as of January 2015.

=== Religious participation ===
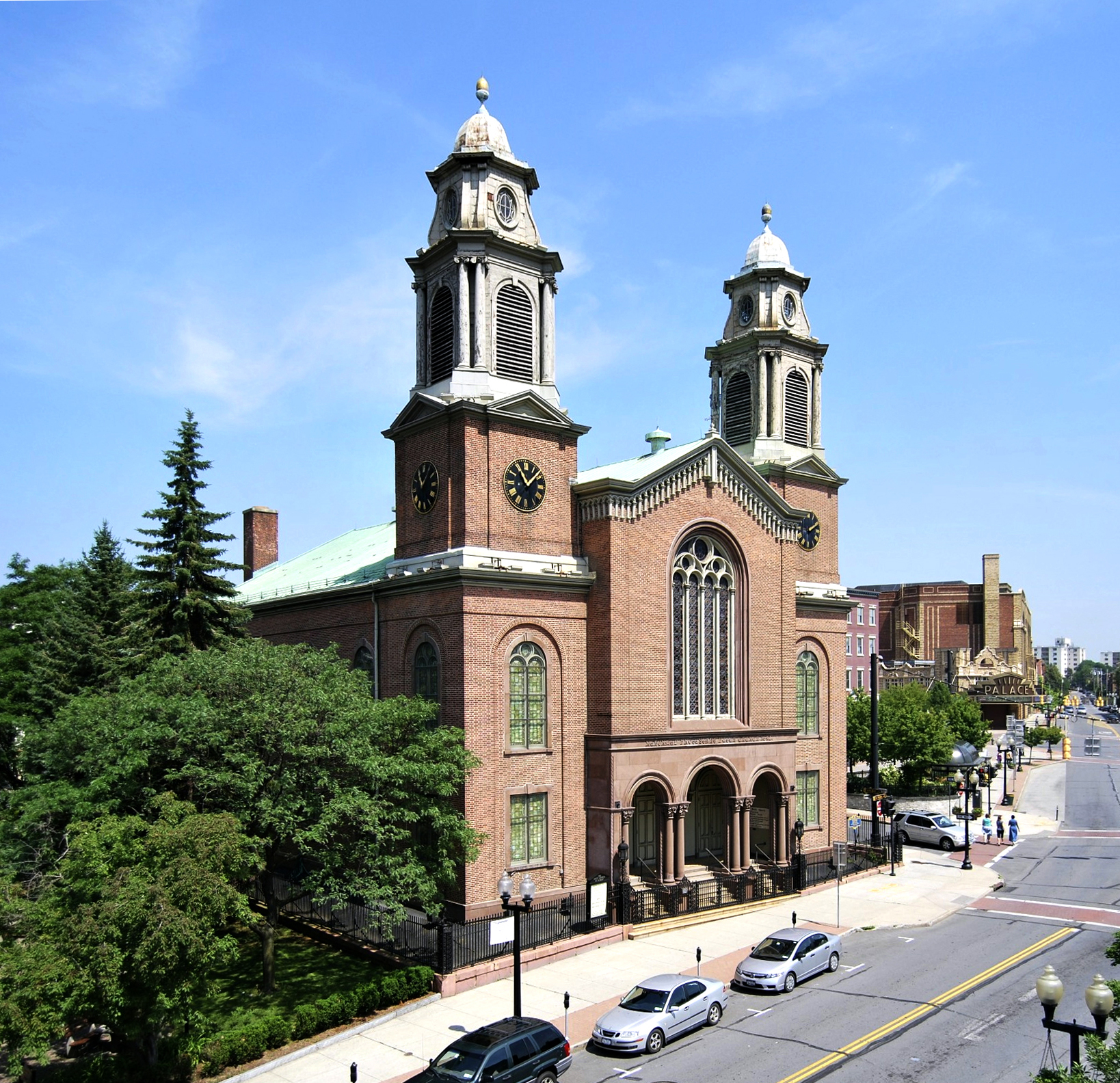
The First Church in Albany (Reformed) is the oldest congregation in Upstate New York.

Like most cities of comparable age and size, Albany has well-established Orthodox Christian, Roman Catholic, Protestant, and Jewish communities. Albany is home to the oldest Christian congregation in Upstate New York and the Mother Churches of two Christian dioceses. As of June 2010, eight churches or religious buildings in the city were listed on the National Register of Historic Places, one of which—St. Peter's Episcopal Church on State Street—is a National Historic Landmark. Established in 1642, the congregation of the First Church in Albany (Reformed), also known as the North Dutch Church (on North Pearl Street), is the second-oldest Reformed Church in America. The Cathedral of the Immaculate Conception (Eagle Street and Madison Avenue, built 1852) is the cathedral of the Roman Catholic Diocese of Albany, led by Bishop Edward Scharfenberger, and the Cathedral of All Saints (South Swan Street and Elk Street, built 1888) is the cathedral of the Episcopal Diocese of Albany. As of 2023, the city was home to twelve Catholic churches and four Episcopal churches. Despite its history of Christendom, in 2019 the Albany-Schenectady-Troy MSA was found to be among the most post-Christian cities in the United States in a study by Christian polling firm The Barna Group.

A significant Jewish presence has existed in Albany as early as 1658. As of 2010, Albany is home to two Conservative synagogues, a Chabad-Lubavitch synagogue, an Orthodox synagogue, and two Reform synagogues. Albany is also home to one of the few Karaite synagogues outside Israel. As of 2008, the total membership in Albany's synagogues was estimated at 12,000–13,000, with half the members residing outside the city. Since the early 2000s, there has been an increase in Orthodox Jews moving to Albany from the New York Metro area, largely due to cheaper housing prices and closer walking proximity to synagogues.

The Islamic community in Albany and its surrounding suburbs is represented by at least four major mosques in the region. The Muslim population increased substantially starting in the late 2000s, with the arrival of many refugees from countries such as Iraq, Syria, and Afghanistan.

Exact numbers on religious denominations in Albany are not readily available. Demographic statistics in the United States depend heavily on the United States Census Bureau, which cannot ask about religious affiliation as part of its decennial census. It does compile some national and statewide religious statistics, but these are not representative of a city the size of Albany. One report from 2000 offers religious affiliations for Albany County. According to the data, 59.2% of Albany County residents identified as Christian: 47% are Roman Catholic, 8.4% are mainline Protestants, 2.7% are Evangelical Protestants, and 1.1% are Eastern or Oriental Orthodox Christians. Residents who practice Judaism make up 4.2% of the population and Muslims represent 0.2%.

=== 2020 census ===
As of the 2020 census, Albany had a population of 99,224. The median age was 32.2 years. 17.8% of residents were under the age of 18 and 13.3% of residents were 65 years of age or older. For every 100 females there were 93.5 males, and for every 100 females age 18 and over there were 91.3 males age 18 and over.

100.0% of residents lived in urban areas, while 0.0% lived in rural areas.

There were 42,158 households in Albany, of which 21.8% had children under the age of 18 living in them. Of all households, 22.4% were married-couple households, 29.1% were households with a male householder and no spouse or partner present, and 39.5% were households with a female householder and no spouse or partner present. About 43.0% of all households were made up of individuals and 11.9% had someone living alone who was 65 years of age or older.

There were 48,031 housing units, of which 12.2% were vacant. The homeowner vacancy rate was 2.7% and the rental vacancy rate was 7.8%.

Racial composition as of the 2020 census
Race	Number	Percent
White	46,391	46.8%
Black or African American	31,023	31.3%
American Indian and Alaska Native	436	0.4%
Asian	7,993	8.1%
Native Hawaiian and Other Pacific Islander	77	0.1%
Some other race	5,411	5.5%
Two or more races	7,893	8.0%
Hispanic or Latino (of any race)	11,541	11.6%

According to the 2020 American Community Survey, the Latino population was: 4.57% Puerto Rican, 1.45% Dominican, .84% Ecuadorian, .77% Mexican, .69% Salvadoran, .22% Cuban.

=== 2010 census ===
As of the 2010 census, Albany's population density was 4,572.7 inhabitants per square mile (1,765.5/km^{2}). There were 46,362 housing units at an average density of 2,166.4 per square mile (836.5/km^{2}); 5,205 of these units (11.2%) were vacant. The racial makeup of the city residents was 52.3% white; 27% Black or African American; 0.06% Native American or Native Alaskan; 7.4% Asian; 0.1% Native Hawaiian or Pacific Islander; .06% from other races; and 3.6% from two or more races. A total of 9.2% of the population were Hispanic or Latino of any race. (Note: The percentages listed here were calculated using the raw population data given by the Census Bureau divided by the total population, rounded to the nearest hundredth. These percentages were calculated using the total population value of 97,856 as the divisor, not the 94,233 people claiming one race.) Non-Hispanic Whites were 52.0% of the population in 2010, compared to 87.0% in 1970.

As of 2010, 20.0% of Albany's population was under the age of 18, 19.3% was aged 18 to 24, 29.2% was aged 25 to 44, 18.1% was aged 45 to 64, and 13.4% was aged 65 years or older. The median age was 31.4 years. For every 100 females, there were 90.6 males. For every 100 females age 18 and over, there were 86.5 males. Some 81.3% of the population had completed high school or earned an equivalency diploma.

=== 2000 census ===
As of the 2000 census, the top five ancestry groups in the city were African American (27%), Irish (18.1%), Italian (12.4%), German (10.4%), and English (5.2%); (33.1%) of the population reported "other ancestries". Albany is home to a Triqui language-speaking community of Mexican-Americans.

There were 40,709 households in Albany in 2000, of which 22.0% had children under the age of 18 living with them, 25.3% were married couples living together, 16.1% had a female householder with no husband present, and 54.8% were non-families. 41.9% of all households were made up of individuals, and 11.5% had someone living alone who was 65 years of age or older. The average household size was 2.11 and the average family size was 2.95.

The median income for a household in the city in 2000 was $96,713, and the median income for a family was $100,374 (male, year-round worker) and $91,052 (female, year-round worker). The per capita income for the city was $73,985. (Note: These values were given in 1999 dollars; here they have been adjusted for inflation.) About 16.0% of families and 21.7% of the population were below the poverty line, including 28.8% of those under age 18 and 12.5% of those age 65 or over. The rate of reported violent crimes for 2008 (1,095 incidents per 100,000 residents) were more than double the rate for similarly sized US cities. Reported property crimes (4,669 incidents per 100,000 residents) were somewhat lower.

=== Other demographic information ===
With a 2013 Census-estimated population of 1.1 million, the eight county Capital District, encompassing Albany, Troy, Schenectady and Saratoga, is the third-most populous metropolitan region in the state.

Demographically speaking, the population of Albany and the Capital District mirrors the characteristics of the United States consumer population as a whole better than any other major municipality in the country. According to a 2004 study conducted by the Acxiom Corporation, Albany and its environs are the top-ranked standard test market for new business and retail products. Albany, Rochester, and Syracuse all scored within the top five.

=== Crime ===
Albany's violent crime rate was 10.03 per 1,000 residents in 2023, compared to 7.69 in Buffalo, 7.39 in Rochester, 8.22 in Syracuse, and 7.72 in New York City. New York State had statewide violent crime rate of 3.90 per 1,000 people in 2023.

== Economy ==
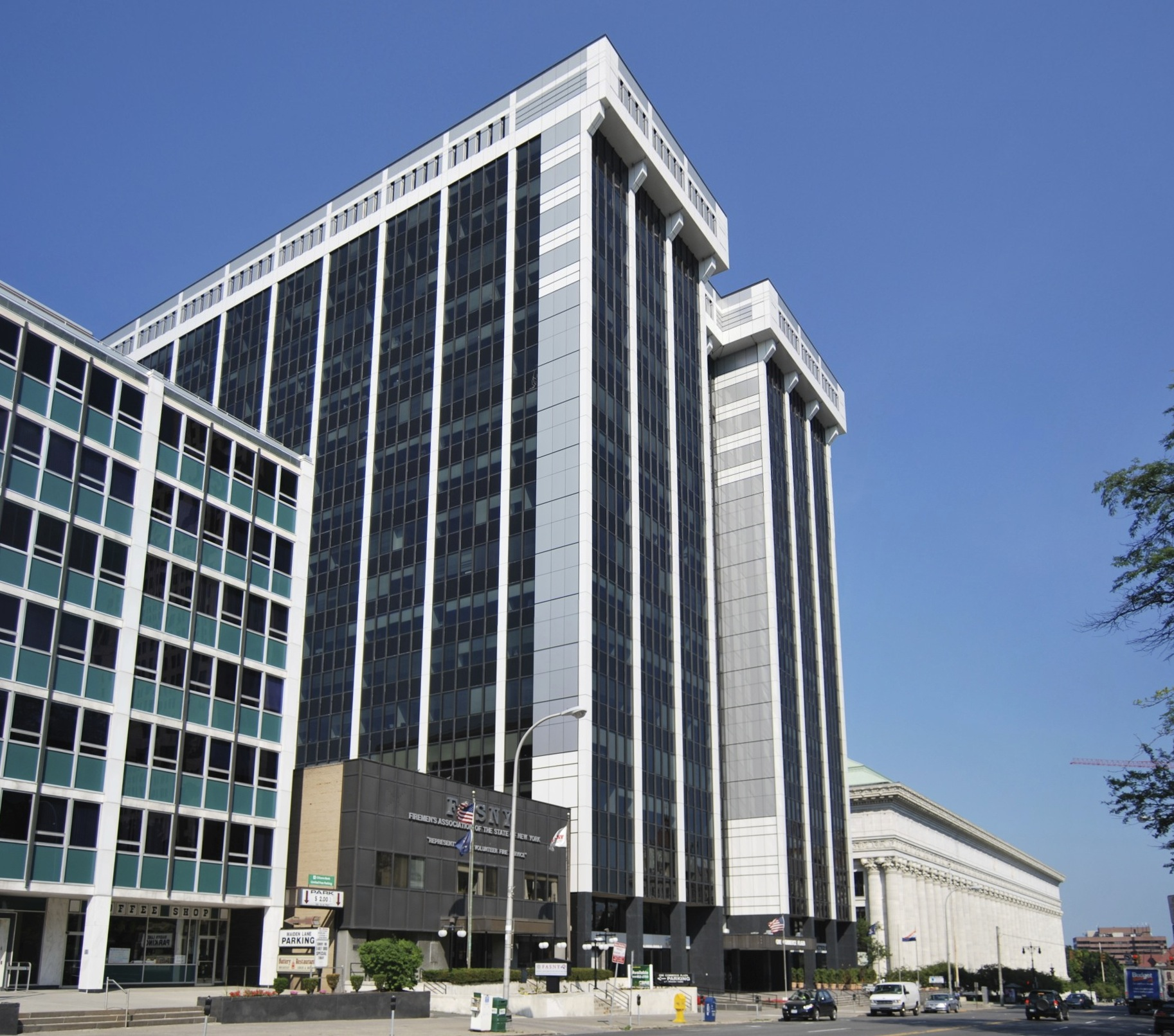
One Commerce Plaza

Albany's economy, along with that of the Capital District in general, is heavily dependent on government, health care, education, and more recently, technology. Because of these typically steady economic bases, the local economy has been relatively immune to national economic recessions in the past. In 2009, more than 25 percent of the city's population worked in government-related positions. Albany's estimated daytime population is more than 162,000. Companies based in Albany include Trans World Entertainment, AMRI Global and Clough Harbour. In 2019, Albany had the fourth-highest amount of lawyers in its employment pool (7.5 lawyers per 1,000 jobs) compared to the rest of the nation, behind Washington, D.C., Trenton, New Jersey, and New York City, respectively.

=== Tech Valley ===
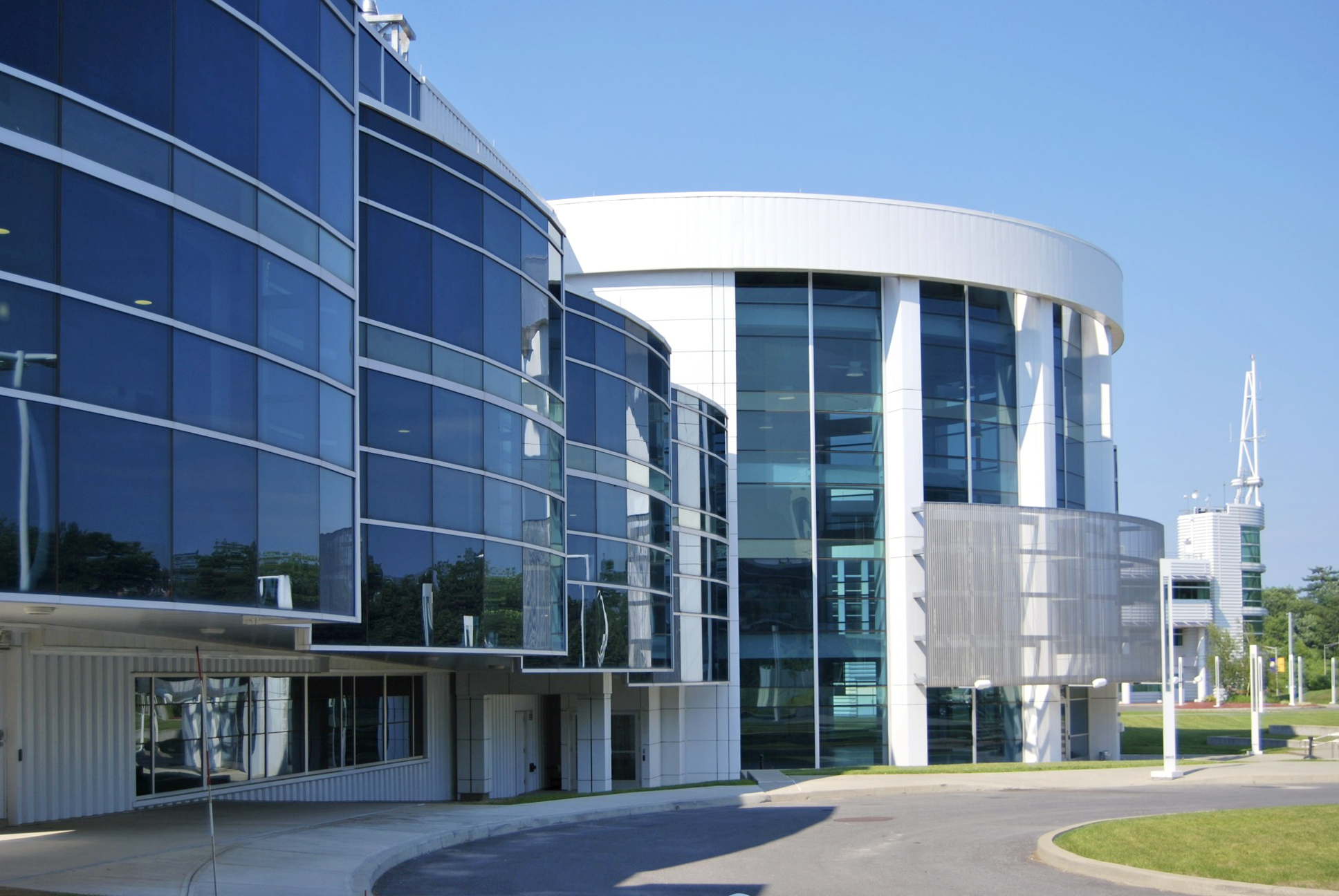
SUNY Polytechnic Institute's College of Nanoscale Science and Engineering embodies Albany's emerging high-tech industry.

Since the 2000s, the economy of Albany and the surrounding Capital District has been directed toward high technology, a growing fourth sector of the area's economic base. Tech Valley is a marketing name for the eastern part of New York State, encompassing Albany, the Capital District, and the Hudson Valley. Originated in 1998 to promote the greater Albany area as a high-tech competitor to regions such as Silicon Valley and Boston, it has since grown to represent the counties in the Capital District and extending to 19 counties from IBM's Westchester County plants in the south to the Canada–US border in the north.

The area's high technology ecosystem is supported by technologically focused academic institutions including Rensselaer Polytechnic Institute and the State University of New York Polytechnic Institute. Tech Valley encompasses 19 counties straddling both sides of the Adirondack Northway and the New York Thruway, and with heavy state taxpayer subsidy, has experienced significant growth in the computer hardware side of the high-technology industry, with great strides in the nanotechnology sector, digital electronics design, and water- and electricity-dependent integrated microchip circuit manufacturing. A notable video game development cluster has grown in and around Albany starting in the 2010s.

== Arts and culture ==
=== Nightlife and entertainment ===
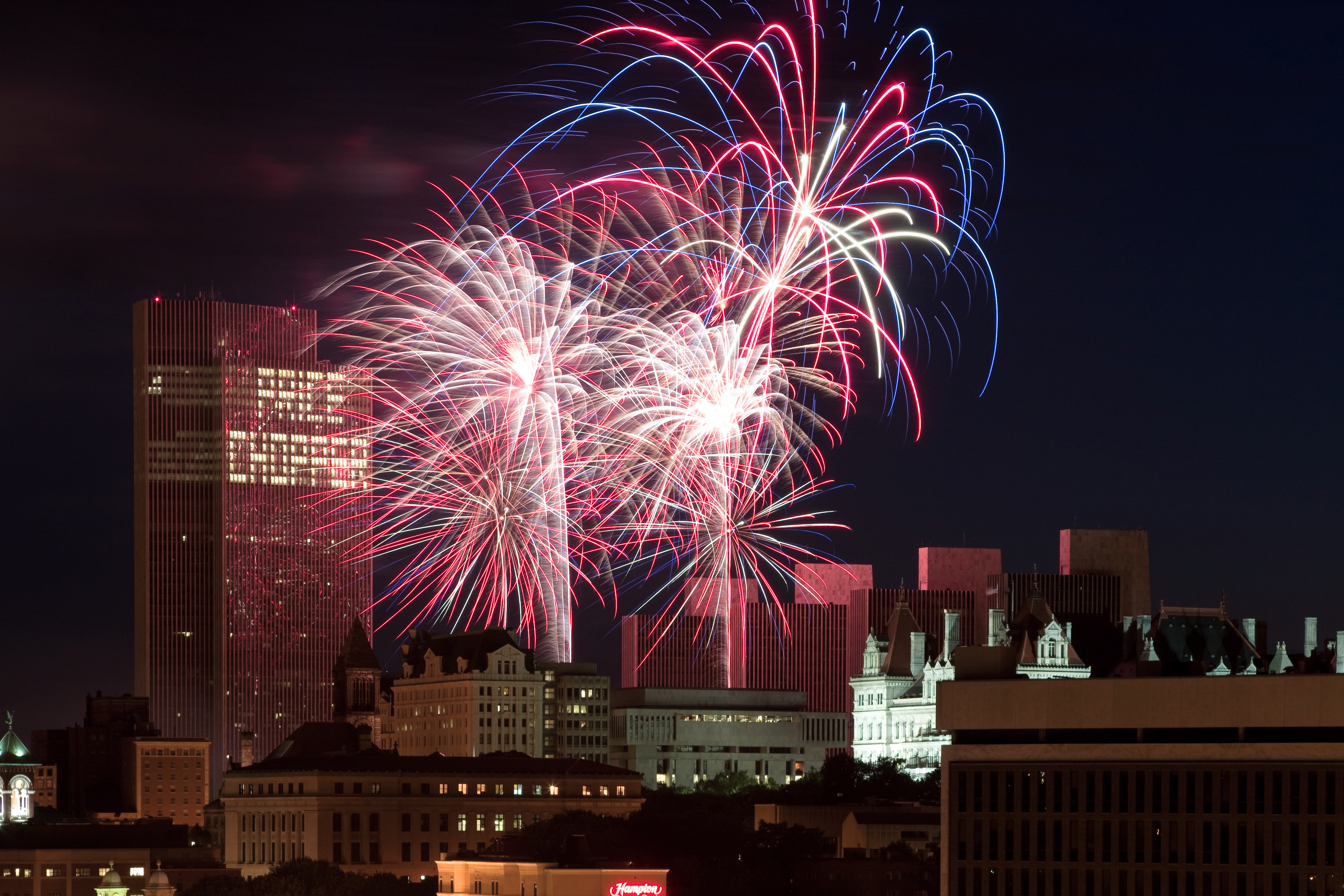
The annual Fourth of July fireworks show at the Empire State Plaza (2009 show pictured)

Albany's geographic situation—roughly equidistant from New York City to the south and Montreal to the north—makes it a convenient stop for nationally touring artists and acts. The Palace Theatre and The Egg are mid-sized forums for music, theater, and spoken-word performances; the Capital Repertory Theatre is smaller. The MVP Arena is the city's largest musical venue for nationally and internationally prominent bands. It also hosts trade shows, sporting events, and other large gatherings. Some people praise the cultural contributions of Albany and the greater Capital District; others suggest that the city has a "cultural identity crisis" due to its widespread geography, which requires a car to reach most of what the area has to offer, a necessity not seen in larger and more densely populated metropolitan areas such as New York and Boston.

In recent years, the city's government has invested resources to cultivate venues and neighborhoods that attract after-hours business. Madison Avenue, Pearl Street, Delaware Avenue and Lark Street are the most active entertainment areas in the city. Many restaurants, clubs, and bars have opened since the mid-1990s, revitalizing areas that had once been abandoned and reclaiming old row houses, businesses, and a pump station. Bars are concentrated in three areas: about two blocks on Park Street, downtown; along Lark Street, home to smaller bars, which fit the neighborhood's artistic and eclectic style; and Western and Madison Avenues, in midtown, centered on the College of Saint Rose and SUNY Albany's downtown campus and drawing younger people. Much of the bar restaurant scene features classic Irish Pubs.

=== Festivals ===
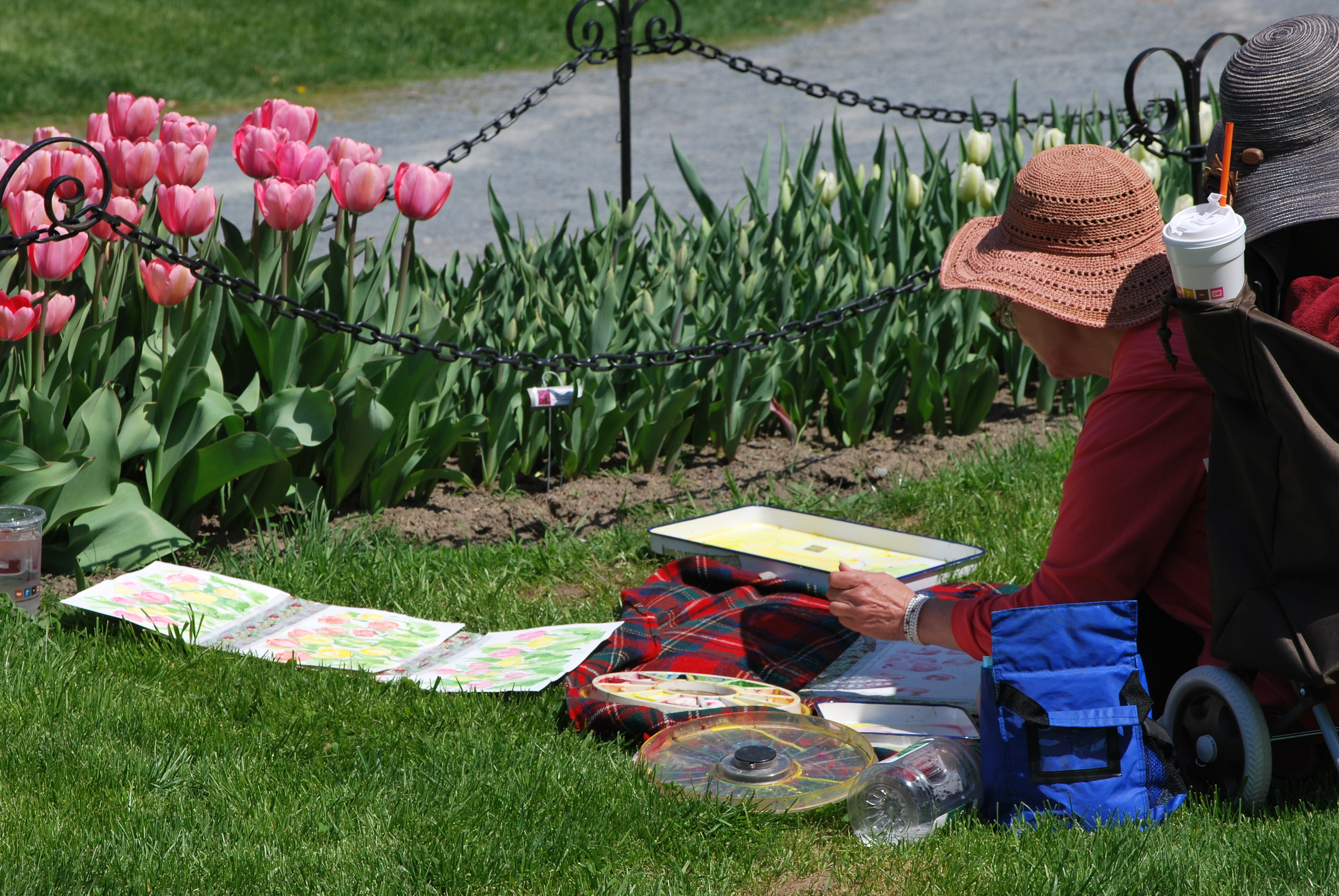
An artist paints tulips during the Tulip Fest at Washington Park.

Alive at 5 is a free, weekly concert series held downtown during the summer on Thursdays; with 10 concerts in 2010, total attendance was roughly 100,000. The Tulip Festival is set in Washington Park and celebrates the city's Dutch heritage, which began with Pinkster Festival, an African-Dutch Celebration. This traditional Albany event marks the beginning of spring as thousands of tulips bloom in the park in early May; attendance to the Tulip Festival in 2010 was approximately 80,000.

The Price Chopper Fabulous Fourth and Fireworks Festival at the Empire State Plaza celebrates Independence Day with musical performances and the region's largest fireworks display.

Freihofer's Run for Women is a 5-kilometer run through the city that draws more than 4,000 participants from across the country; it is an annual event that began in 1978.

The Albany Chefs' Food & Wine Festival: Wine & Dine for the Arts] is an annual Festival that hosts more than 3500 people over 3 days. The Festival showcases more than 70 Regional Chefs & Restaurants, 250 Global Wines & Spirits, a NYS Craft Beer Pavilion, 4 competitions (The Signature Chef Invitational, Rising Star Chef, Barista Albany and Battle of the Bartenders) and one Grand Gala Reception, Dinner & Auction featuring 10 of Albany's Iconic Chefs. The Albany Chefs' Food & Wine Festival donates all net proceeds to deserving Albany Arts Organizations and is held the Thursday-Saturday preceding Martin Luther King Weekend.

Smaller events include the African American Family Day Arts Festival each August at the Empire State Plaza; the Latin Fest, held each August at the Corning Preserve; the Albany Jazz Festival, an annual end-of-summer event held at the Corning Preserve; and Lark Fest, a music and art festival held each fall.

=== Museums and historic sites ===
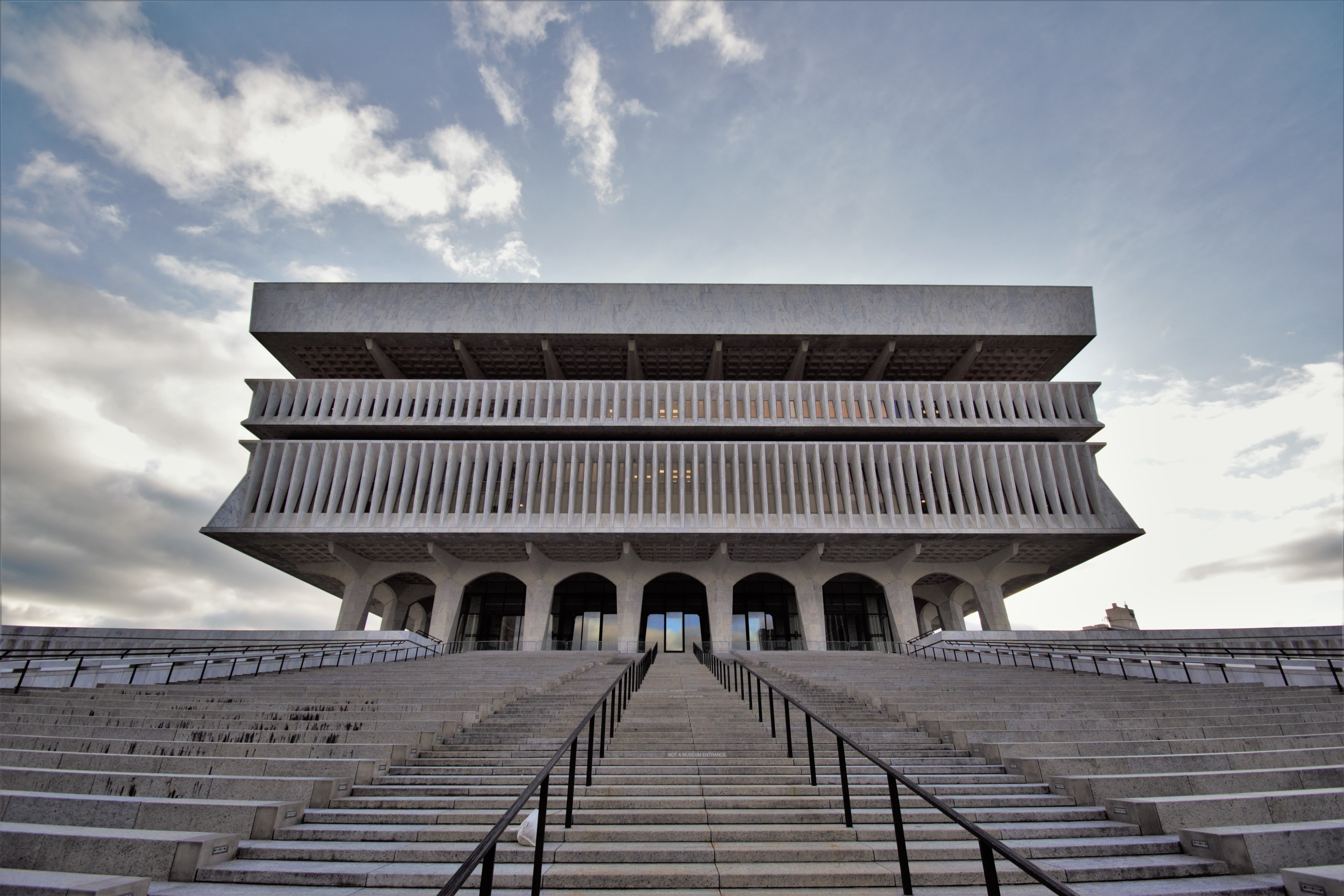
The Cultural Education Center on Empire State Plaza housing the State Museum, Library, and Archives

Because of Albany's historical and political significance, the city has numerous museums, historical buildings, and historic districts. Albany is home to the New York State Museum, the New York State Library and the New York State Archives; all three facilities are in the Cultural Education Center at the south end of Empire State Plaza and are free to the public. The USS Slater (DE-766), a decommissioned World War II destroyer escort that was restored in 1998, is a museum ship docked in the Hudson River at Quay Street. It is the only ship of its kind still afloat. The Albany Heritage Area Visitors Center, at the corner of Clinton Avenue and Broadway at Quackenbush Square, hosts a museum, gift shop, and the Henry Hudson Planetarium. In early 2012, the Irish American Heritage Museum opened in downtown Albany. The museum is home to exhibits highlighting the contributions of the Irish people in America.

The Albany Institute of History and Art, on Washington Avenue near the Center Square Neighborhood and State Capitol, is "dedicated to collecting, preserving, interpreting and promoting interest in the history, art, culture of Albany and the Upper Hudson Valley region." The museum's most notable permanent exhibits include an extensive collection of paintings by the Hudson River School and an exhibit on Ancient Egypt featuring the institute's "Albany Mummies".

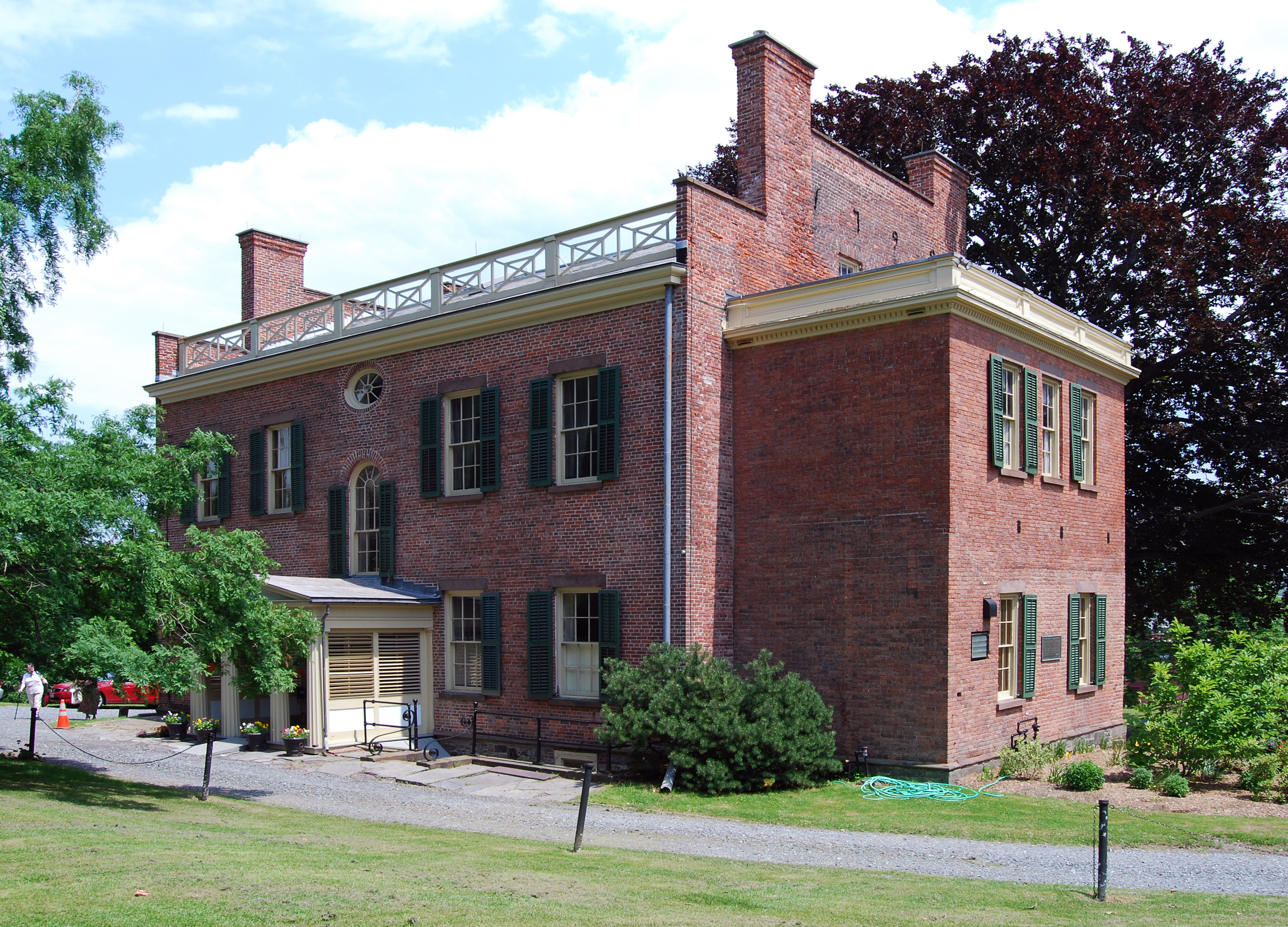
Ten Broeck Mansion is home to the Albany County Historical Association.

Albany is home to 57 listings on the National Register of Historic Places (NRHP) and five National Historic Landmarks. The Ten Broeck Mansion, a 1797 Federal-style mansion (later renovated in the Greek-Revival style) built for Abraham Ten Broeck (mayor of Albany 1779–1783 and 1796–1798) is a historic house museum and the headquarters of the Albany County Historical Association; it was added to the NRHP in 1971. Later known as "Arbor Hill", it gave the current neighborhood its name.

=== Literature and film ===
Albany has been the subject, inspiration, or location for many written and cinematic works. Many non-fiction works have been written on the city. One of the city's more notable claims to fame is Ironweed (1983), the 1984 Pulitzer Prize-winning book by Albany native William Kennedy. Ironweed was the third in a series of books by Kennedy known as the "Albany Cycle". The elusive author Trevanian also grew up in Albany and wrote The Crazyladies of Pearl Street (2005), about a North Albany neighborhood along Pearl Street. The book is considered a semi-autobiographical memoir.

In 1987, the film version of Ironweed premiered at the Palace Theatre. The movie starred Jack Nicholson and Meryl Streep, each of whom were nominated for Academy Awards for their performances; much of the filming was done on location in Albany. Most recently the downtown area was the site of filming for the action-thriller Salt, starring Angelina Jolie, and the action-comedy The Other Guys, starring Will Ferrell and Mark Wahlberg.

Authors Herman Melville and Henry James lived with their families in Albany when young, before their careers. James identified his character Isabel Archer, the heroine of his novel The Portrait of a Lady, as being from Albany. Gregory Maguire, author of Wicked: The Life and Times of the Wicked Witch of the West (adapted for the Broadway hit Wicked), grew up in North Albany and graduated from SUNY Albany.

=== Architecture ===
The New York State Capitol

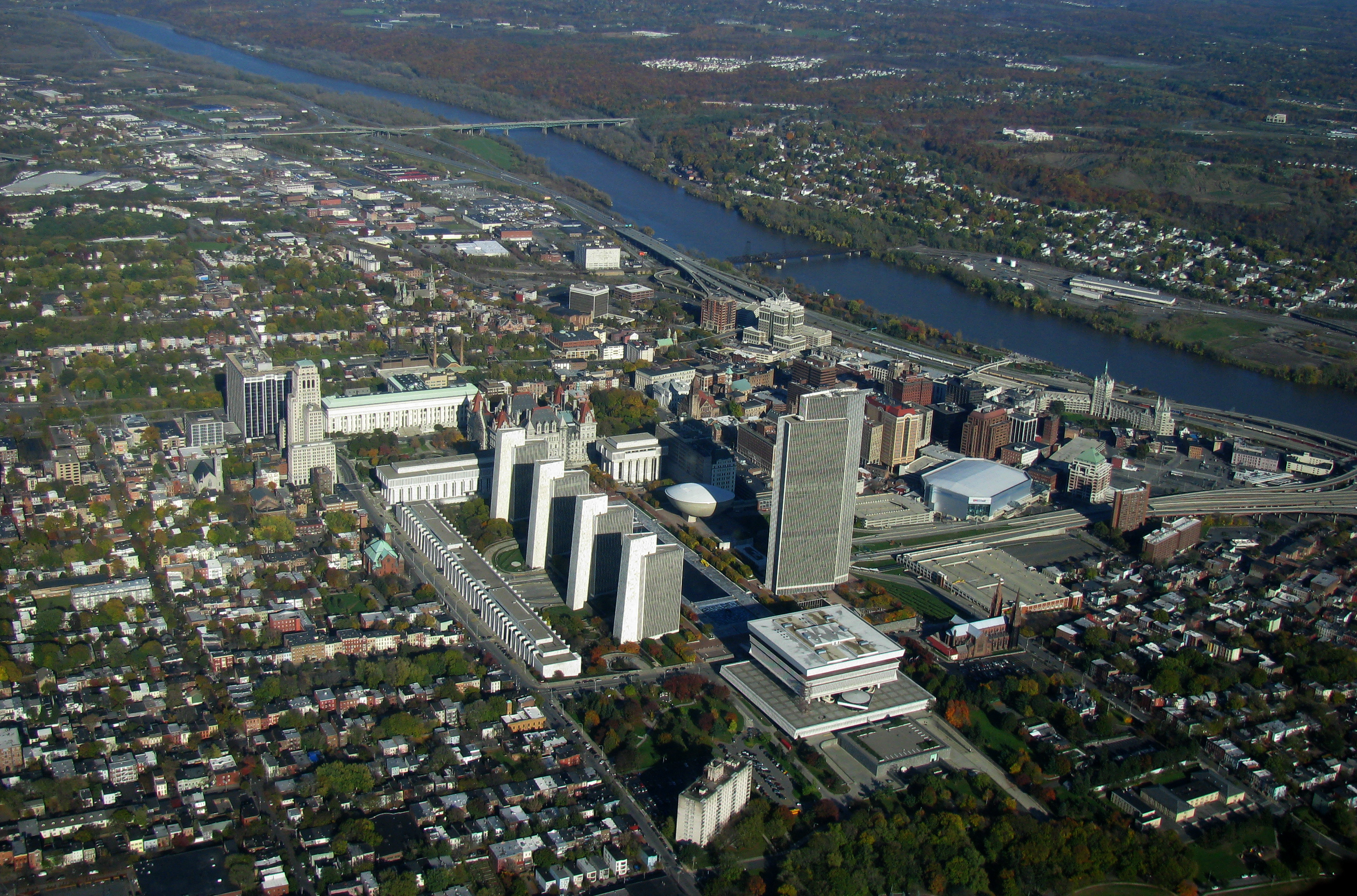
Aerial view of Albany looking northeast

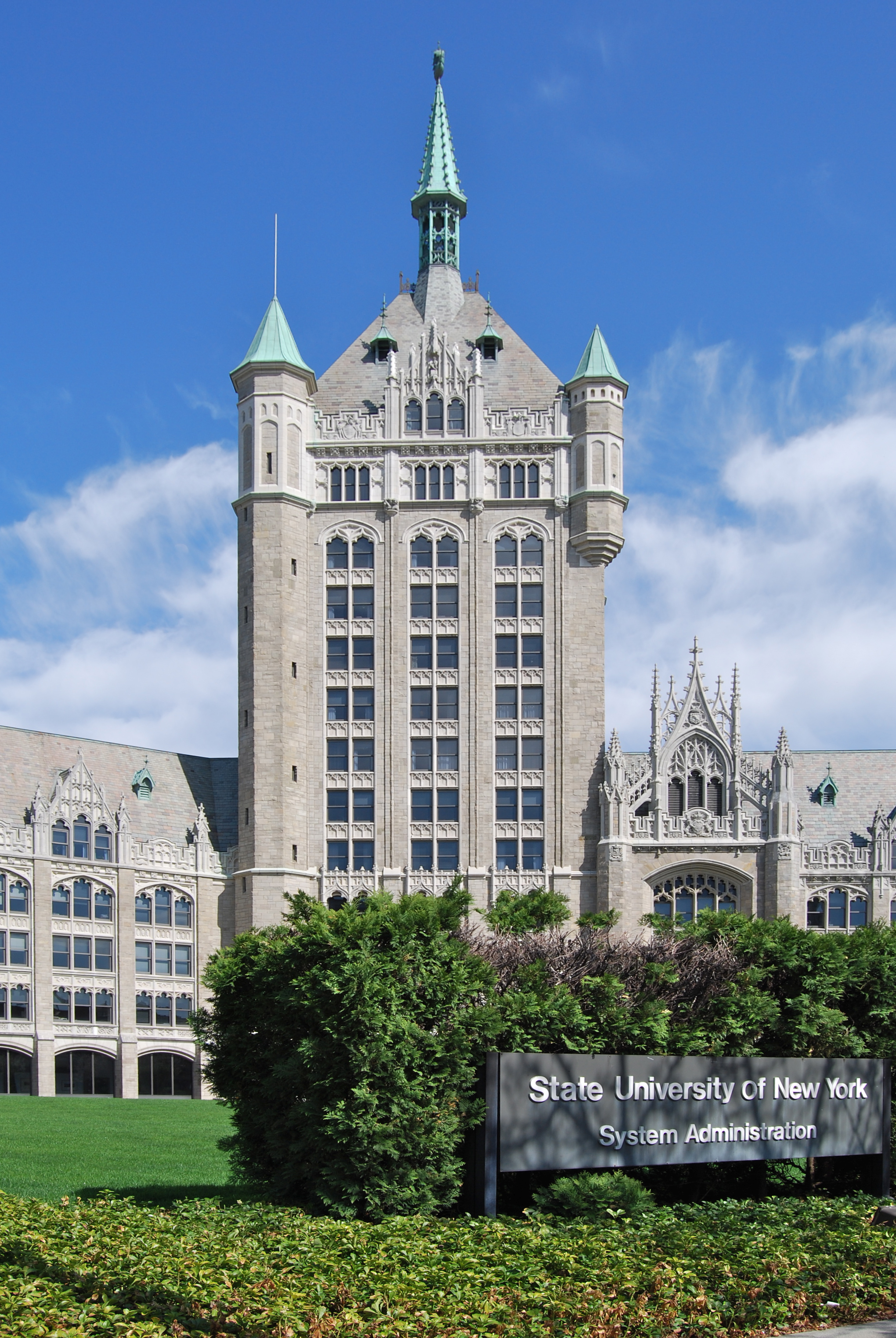
System Administration Building of the State University of New York

The Empire State Plaza, a collection of state agency office buildings, dominates almost any view of Albany. Built between 1965 and 1978 at the hand of Governor Nelson A. Rockefeller and architect Wallace Harrison, the complex is a powerful example of late American modern architecture and remains a controversial building project both for displacing city residents and for its architectural style. The most recognizable aspect of the complex is the Erastus Corning Tower, the tallest building in New York outside of New York City. Juxtaposed at the north end of the Plaza is the 19th-century New York State Capitol, the seat of the New York State Legislature and the home of the Governor's office.

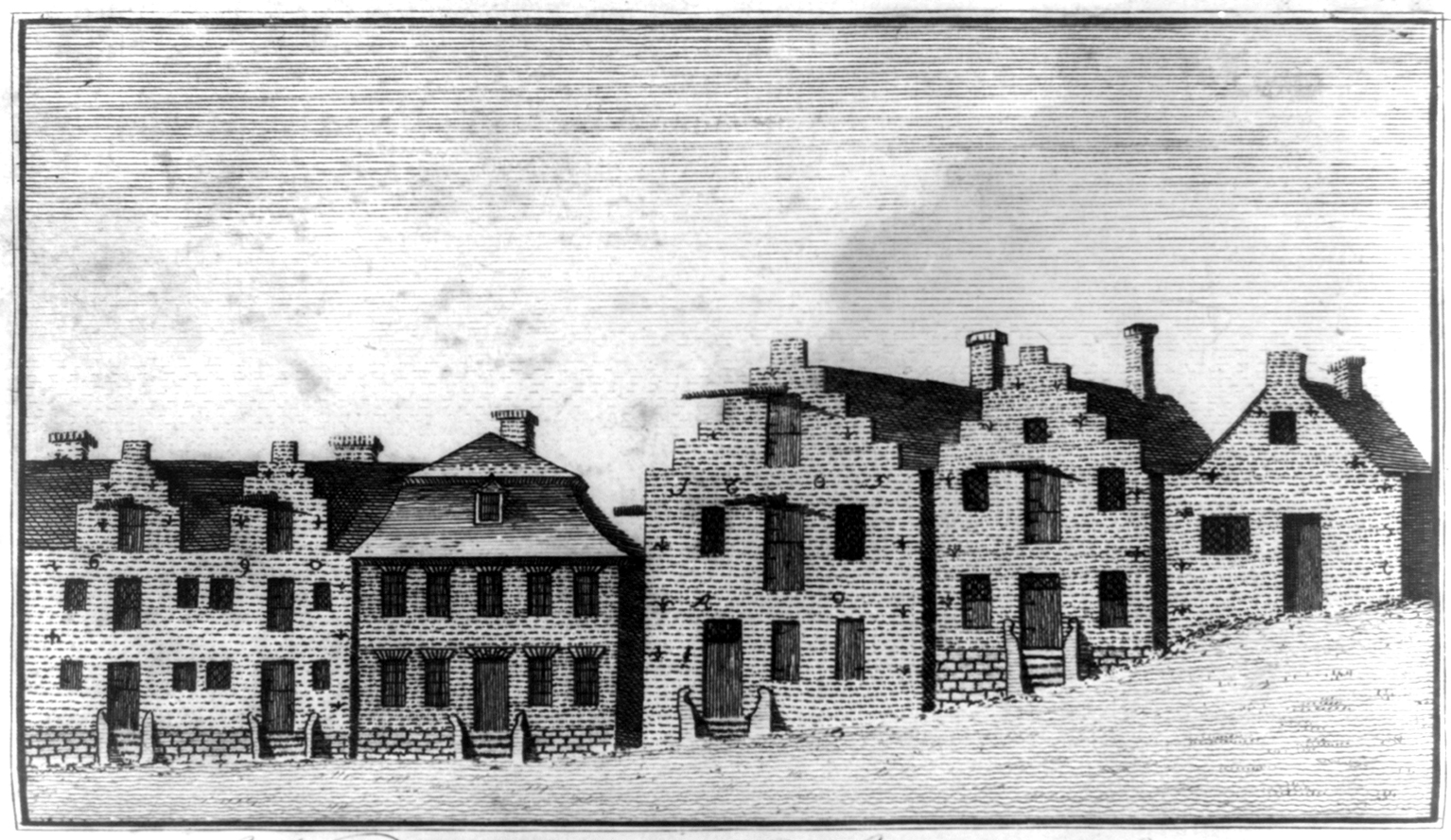
This 1789 etching shows the Dutch influence on the architecture of early Albany.

Albany's initial architecture incorporated many Dutch influences, followed soon after by those of the English. Quackenbush House, a Dutch Colonial brick mansion, was built c. 1736; Schuyler Mansion, a Georgian-style mansion, was built in 1765; and the oldest building in Albany is the 1728 Van Ostrande-Radliff House at 48 Hudson Avenue. Albany's housing varies greatly, with mostly row houses in the older sections of town, closer to the river. Housing type quickly changes as one travels westward, beginning with two-family homes of the late 19th century, and one-family homes built after World War II in the western end of the city.

Albany City Hall, designed by Henry Hobson Richardson, was opened in 1883. The New York State Capitol was opened in 1899 (after 32 years of construction) at a cost of $25 million, making it the most expensive government building at the time. Albany's Union Station, a major Beaux-Arts design, was under construction at the same time; it opened in 1900. In 1912, the Beaux-Arts styled New York State Department of Education Building opened on Washington Avenue near the Capitol. It has a classical exterior, which features a block-long white marble colonnade. The 1920s brought the Art Deco movement, which is illustrated by the Home Savings Bank Building (1927) on North Pearl Street and the Alfred E. Smith Building (1930) on South Swan Street, two of Albany's tallest high-rises.

Architecture from the 1960s and 1970s is well represented in the city, especially at the W. Averell Harriman State Office Building Campus (1950s and 1960s) and on the uptown campus of the University at Albany (1962–1971). The state office campus was planned in the 1950s by governor W. Averell Harriman to offer more parking and easier access for state employees. The uptown SUNY campus was built in the 1960s under Governor Rockefeller on the site of the city-owned Albany Country Club. Straying from the popular open campus layout, SUNY Albany has a centralized building layout with administrative and classroom buildings at center surrounded by four student housing towers. The design called for much use of concrete and glass, and the style has slender, round-topped columns and pillars reminiscent of those at Lincoln Center in New York City.

Downtown has seen a revival in recent decades, often considered to have begun with Norstar Bank's renovation of the former Union Station as its corporate headquarters in 1986. (Note: In 2009, Bank of America (which now owns FleetBank, the bank that eventually bought Norstar) consolidated its operations in an office building on State Street, leaving the former train station vacant. Mayor Corning made great efforts to save the building, which had been owned by his great-grandfather's railroad a hundred years before. He was able to do it when governor Rockefeller brought state money in to purchase the building.) The Knickerbocker Arena (MVP Arena) was originally slated for suburban Colonie, but was instead built downtown and opened in 1990. Other development in downtown includes the construction of the State Dormitory Authority headquarters at 515 Broadway (1998); the State Department of Environmental Conservation building, with its iconic green dome, at 625 Broadway (2001); the State Comptroller headquarters on State Street (2001); the Hudson River Way (2002), a pedestrian bridge connecting Broadway to the Corning Preserve; and 677 Broadway (2005), "the first privately owned downtown office building in a generation".

== Sports ==
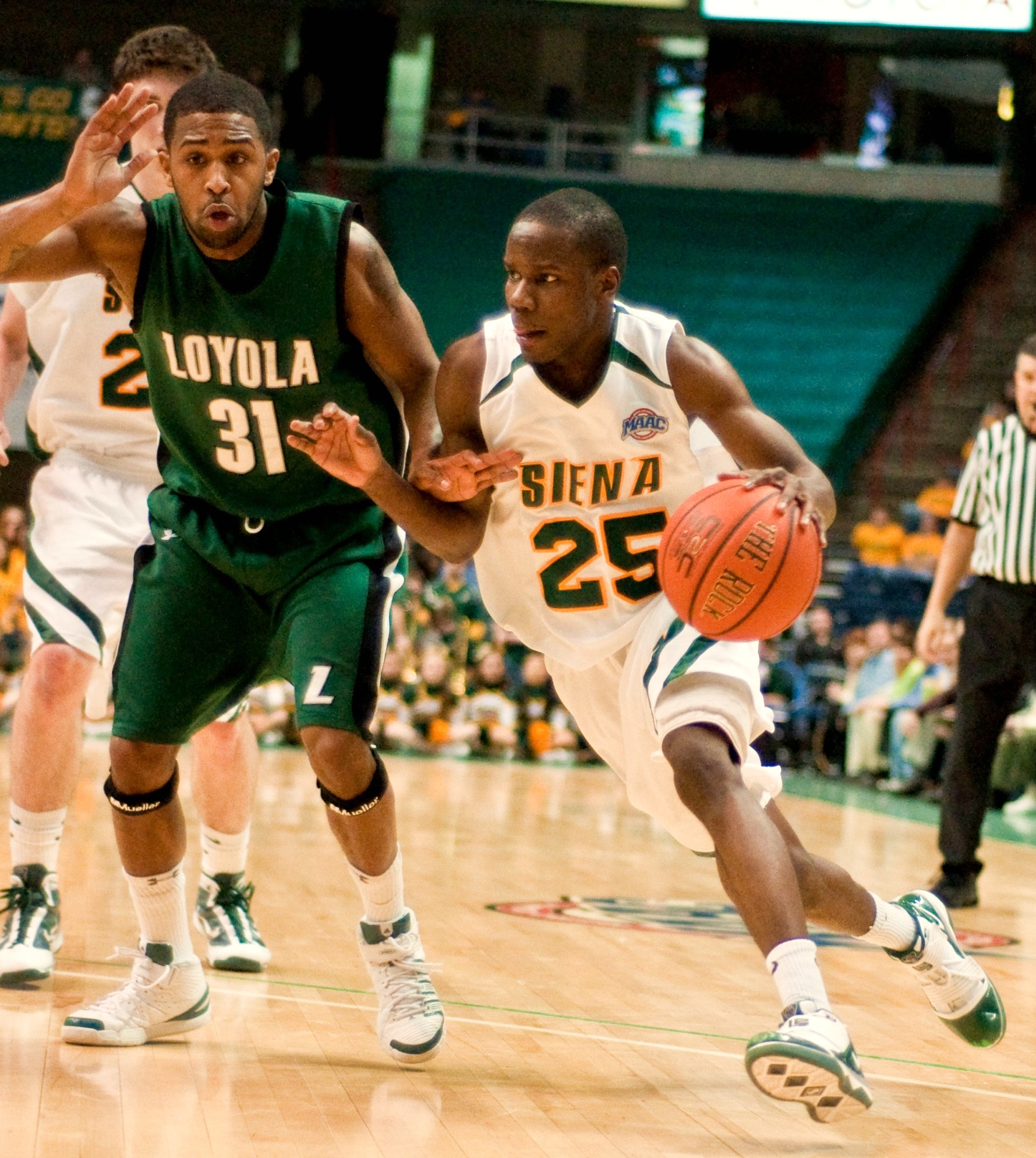
Siena guard Ronald Moore dribbles toward the basket in a game against Loyola in January 2010.

Albany has teams in two top-level professional sports leagues in the United States and Canada (New York Atlas, and Albany Firebirds), and several minor-league sports teams with varying levels of support.

The Albany Devils were a minor league ice hockey team that moved to the city for the 2010–11 season. They played in the American Hockey League and were affiliated with the New Jersey Devils of the National Hockey League. The Devils replaced the Albany River Rats, who played in the Capital Region from 1990 to 2010, when they relocated to Charlotte, North Carolina. The Albany Devils moved to Binghamton, New York in 2017.

The Times Union Center has previously hosted arena football teams including the Albany Firebirds in the Arena Football League (AFL) from 1990 to 2000 and then a team originally known as the Albany Conquest and later the Firebirds in the af2, the AFL's developmental league, from 2002 to 2009. The Albany Empire played in the AFL from 2018 through the 2019 season when the league folded. A new Albany Empire was relaunched in the National Arena League for the 2021 season. In 2023, Antonio Brown bought the team; after a series of problems with payments and personnel, the NAL suspended the franchise in the middle of the 2023 season. A relaunched Albany Firebirds franchise began playing in 2024.

The Tri-City ValleyCats short season minor league baseball team have played at the Joseph L. Bruno Stadium on the Hudson Valley Community College campus in North Greenbush since 2002. Prior to the ValleyCats' arrival, the Albany-Colonie Diamond Dogs (1995–2002) played at Heritage Park in Colonie; due to financial pressures, and facing impending competition from the ValleyCats, the franchise folded in 2002.

The Albany Legends (International Basketball League), played in the Washington Avenue Armory from 2010 to 2014 before moving to Schenectady. The Albany Patroons have played at the Armory on and off since 1982 and currently play in The Basketball League.

With the large number of local colleges and universities around Albany, college sports are popular. The University at Albany's Great Danes play at the Division I level in all sports. The football team is a member of the Coastal Athletic Association while all other sports teams play as members of the America East Conference. In 2006, UAlbany became the first SUNY-affiliated school to send a team to the NCAA Division I men's basketball tournament. The Siena Saints saw a rise in popularity after their men's basketball team made it to the NCAA Tournament in 2008, 2009, and 2010. All 18 Saints teams are Division I and play in the Metro Atlantic Athletic Conference. Although Siena's campus is in nearby Colonie, the men's basketball team plays at the Times Union Center.

UAlbany hosted the New York Giants training camp from 1996 to 2012.

On February 23, 2021, it was announced that the National Lacrosse League (NLL) would return to the city with the relocation of the New England Black Wolves. The team was named the Albany FireWolves on April 15, 2021. This is the second NLL team to be based in the area; the first, the Albany Attack, played in the city from 2000 to 2003.

In 2023, the Premier Lacrosse League (PLL) selected cities for their 8 franchises, and Albany was chosen as the primary home for the New York Atlas.

In 2024, the Albany Firebirds began playing in the AFL at the MVP Arena. After one season in the AFL, the team moved to the AF1.

The 518 Ballers (American Basketball Association) have played at Our Savior's Christian School since 2023.

== Parks and recreation ==
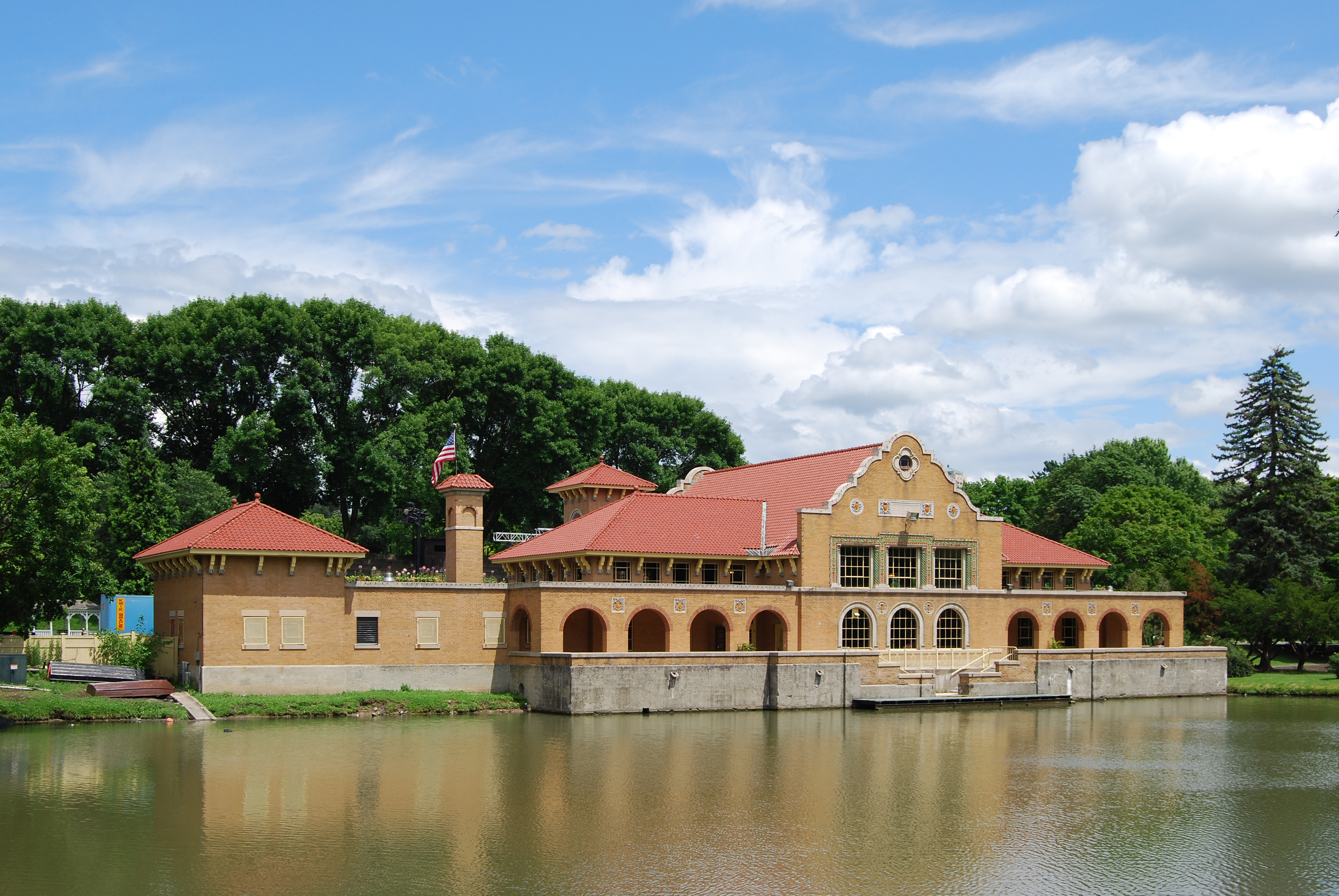
The 1929 Washington Park Lake House replaced a wooden lake house built in 1876.

Albany has more than 60 public parks and recreation areas. Washington Park was organized as the Middle Public Square in 1806. Its current location has been public property since the Dongan Charter of 1686 gave the city title to all property not privately owned. Washington Park was designed by John Bogart and John Cuyler in 1870, and opened for public use the following year. The original lake house, designed by Frederick W. Brown, was added in 1876. The park had previously been used as a cemetery; its graves were moved to Albany Rural Cemetery. Washington Park is a popular place to exercise and play sports; skate during the winter; people-watch during Tulip Fest; and attend plays at the amphitheater during the summer.

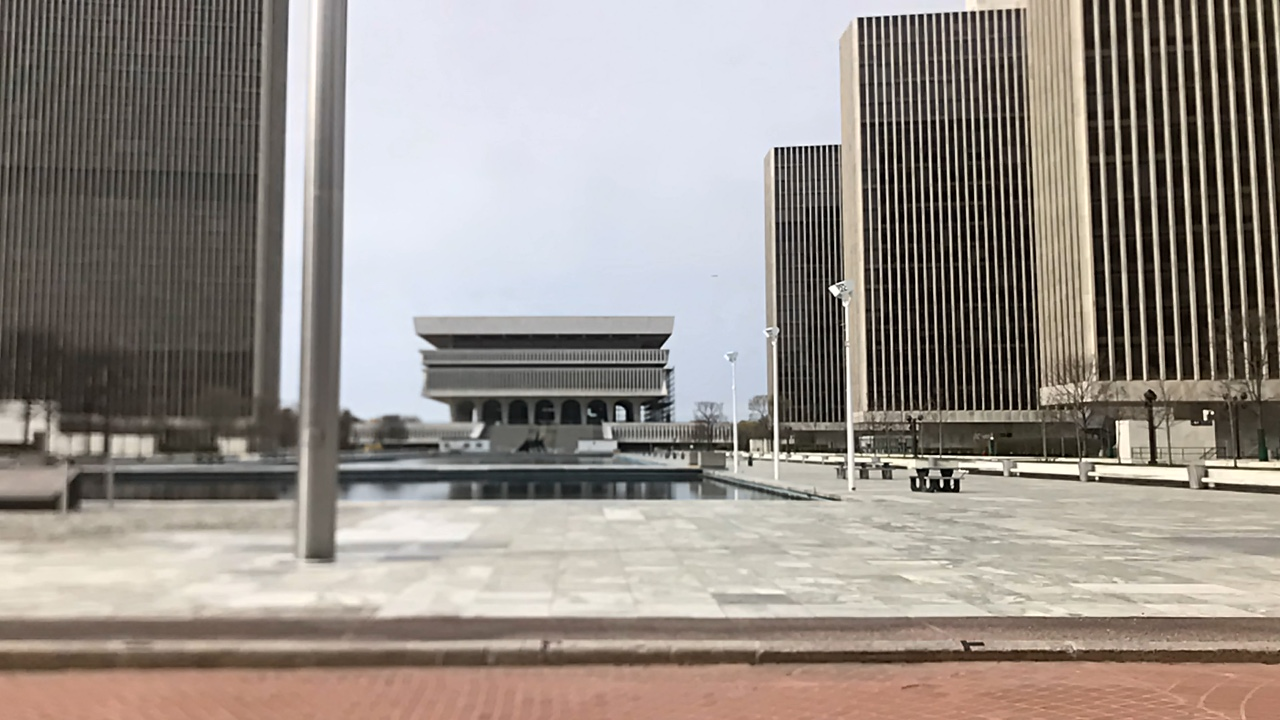
Empire State Plaza

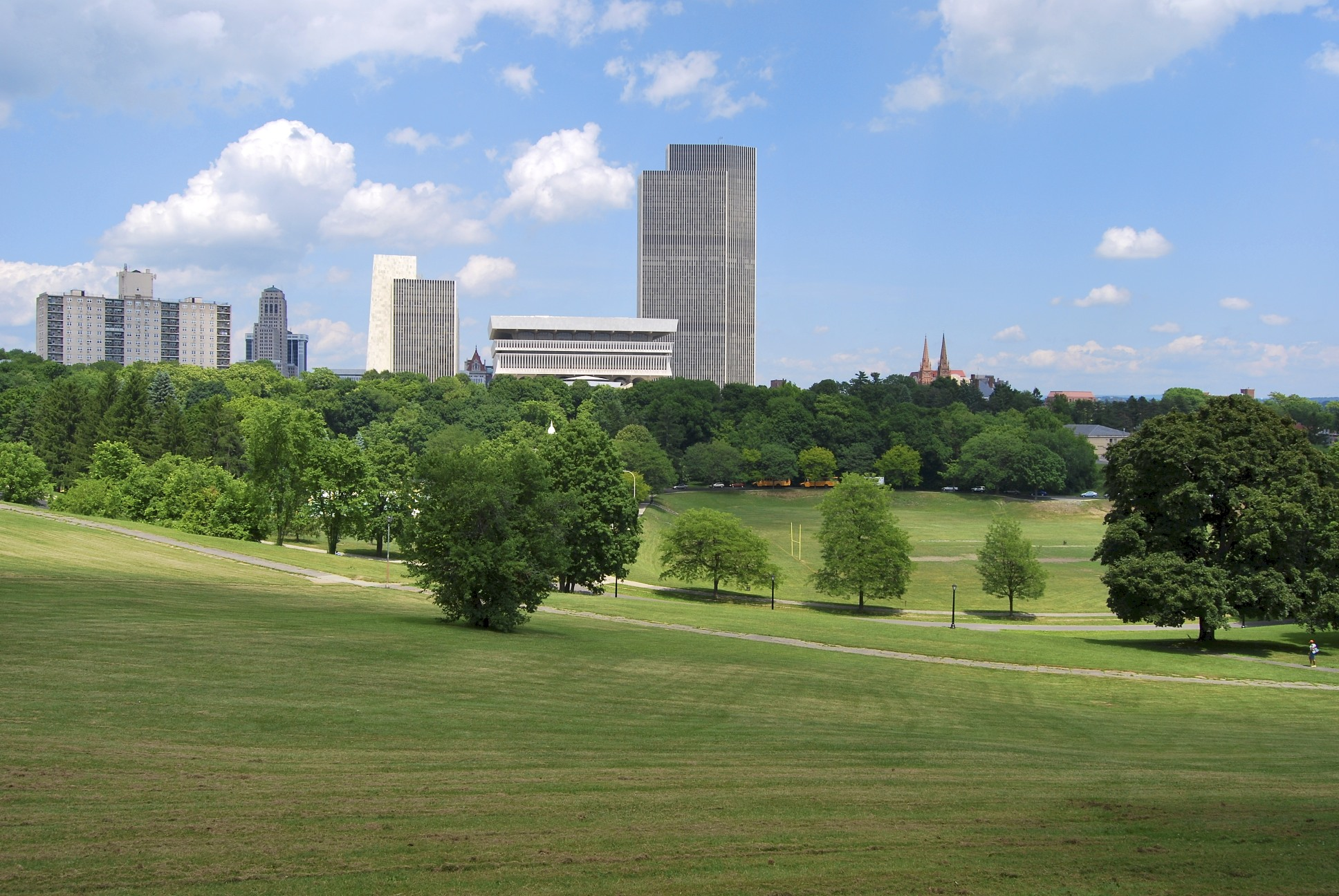
Lincoln Park is flanked on the north by the Empire State Plaza.

Other parks in Albany include Lincoln Park, Buckingham Park, the Corning Preserve, the Albany Skyway and the Pine Bush. Lincoln Park, southwest of the Empire State Plaza, was organized in 1886 and was originally known as Beaver Park. Today, the park has a pool that is open during the summer months. Buckingham Lake Park is between Manning Boulevard and Route 85 in the Buckingham Pond neighborhood; it contains a pond with fountains, a footpath, a playground, and picnic tables. The Albany Riverfront Park at the Corning Preserve has an 800-seat amphitheatre that hosts events in non-winter months, most notably the Alive at 5 summer concert series. The Preserve's visitors center details the ecology of the Hudson River and the local environment. The park has a bike trail and boat launch and was effectively separated from downtown by Interstate 787 until the opening of the Hudson River Way in 2002.

Other public parks include Westland Hill Park, Hoffman Park, Beverwyck Park, and Liberty Park, today a small circular grassy patch in downtown on Hudson Avenue, which is Albany's oldest park. Ridgefield Park is home to the clay courts of the Albany Tennis Club, one of the oldest tennis clubs in the United States. The municipal golf course, New Course at Albany, was constructed in 1929 as the Albany Municipal Golf Course, later renamed the Capital Hills at Albany, and remodeled in 1991.

== Government ==
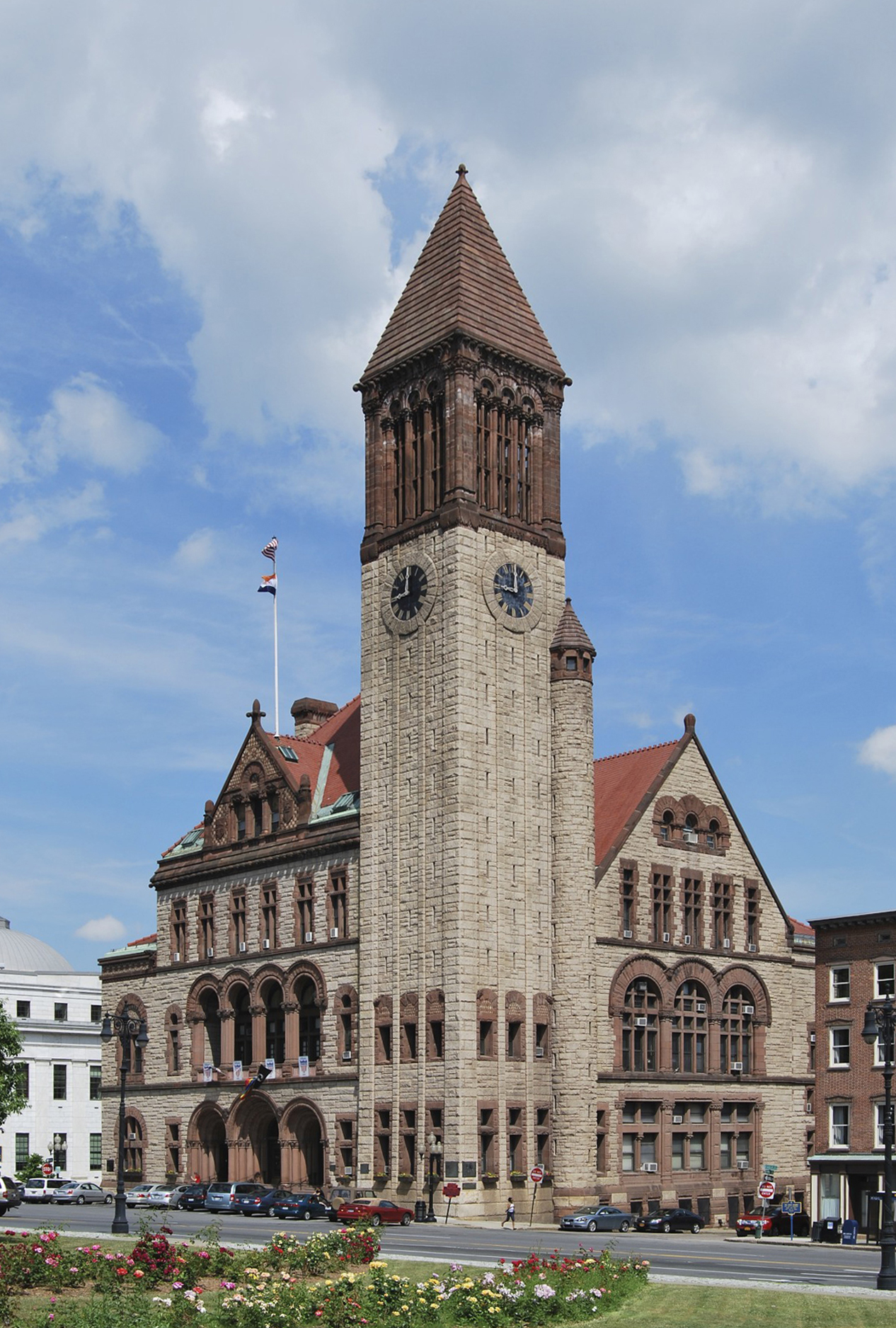
Albany City Hall, an 1883 Richardsonian Romanesque structure, is the seat of Albany's government.

Albany has a strong mayor-council government, which functions under the Dongan Charter, granted by colonial governor Thomas Dongan in 1686 when Albany was incorporated. A revised charter was adopted by referendum in 1998, but was legally reckoned as an amendment to the Dongan Charter. This gives Albany the distinction of having the oldest active city charter in the United States and "arguably the longest-running instrument of municipal government in the Western Hemisphere." The mayor, who is elected every four years, heads the executive branch of city government. The current mayor, Dr. Dorcey Applyrs, was first elected in 2025. The Common Council represents the legislative branch of city government and is made up of fifteen council members (each elected from one ward) and an at-large Common Council President. The current president is Kelly Kimbroughhe began his term in January 2025.

While Albany has its own city government, it has also been the seat of Albany County since the county's formation in 1683 and the capital of New York since 1797. As such, the city is home to all branches of the county and state governments, as well as its own. Albany City Hall sits on Eagle Street, opposite the State Capitol, and the Albany County Office Building is on State Street. The state government has offices scattered throughout the city.

Albany is in the 20th Congressional district, represented by Paul Tonko (D) in the United States House of Representatives. The city is represented by Chuck Schumer (D) and Kirsten Gillibrand (D) in the United States Senate. On the state level, the city is in the 44th district in the New York Senate, represented by Patricia Fahy (D). In the New York Assembly, Albany is in the 109th district, represented by Gabriella Romero (D). As the seat of Albany County, the city is the location of the county's courts including Family Court, County Court, Surrogate Court, Supreme Court, and New York Court of Appeals. Albany is the site of a federal courthouse that houses the United States District Court for the Northern District of New York.

=== Politics ===
Albany's politics have been dominated by the Democratic Party since the 1920s; Daniel (Uncle Dan) O'Connell established a political machine in the city with the election of William Stormont Hackett as mayor in 1922. Prior to that, William Barnes Jr. had set up a Republican machine in the 1890s. Barnes' success is attributed to the fact that he owned two newspapers in Albany and that he was the grandson of Thurlow Weed, the influential newspaper publisher and political boss. O'Connell's organization overcame Barnes' in 1922 and survived well into the 1980s (even after his death). In many instances, votes were outright bought.

Gerald Jennings' upset in the 1993 Democratic mayoral primary over Harold Joyce, who had the Democratic Party's formal endorsement and had only recently been its county chairman, is often cited as the end of the O'Connell era in Albany. In the early 21st century, Albany continued to be dominated by the Democratic Party. As a measure of the party's dominance, Democratic enrollment in the city was 38,862 in 2009, while Republican enrollment was 3,487. As of 2022, the mayor's office had been in Democratic hands since 1922, and every elected city position had been held by a Democrat since 1931.

In November 2013, Kathy Sheehan became the first woman to be elected Mayor of Albany. Mayor Sheehan served until her retirement in 2025.

In November 2025, after a contentious primary Dr. Dorcey Applyrs was elected Mayor of Albany. She is the first person of color elected to Mayor in the city's history and previously served as the Chief City Auditor. Thus far she has established a new Office of Violence Prevention, helped secure new state funding to balance Albany's budget, and passed housing reforms to address the city's ongoing housing crisis.

== Education ==
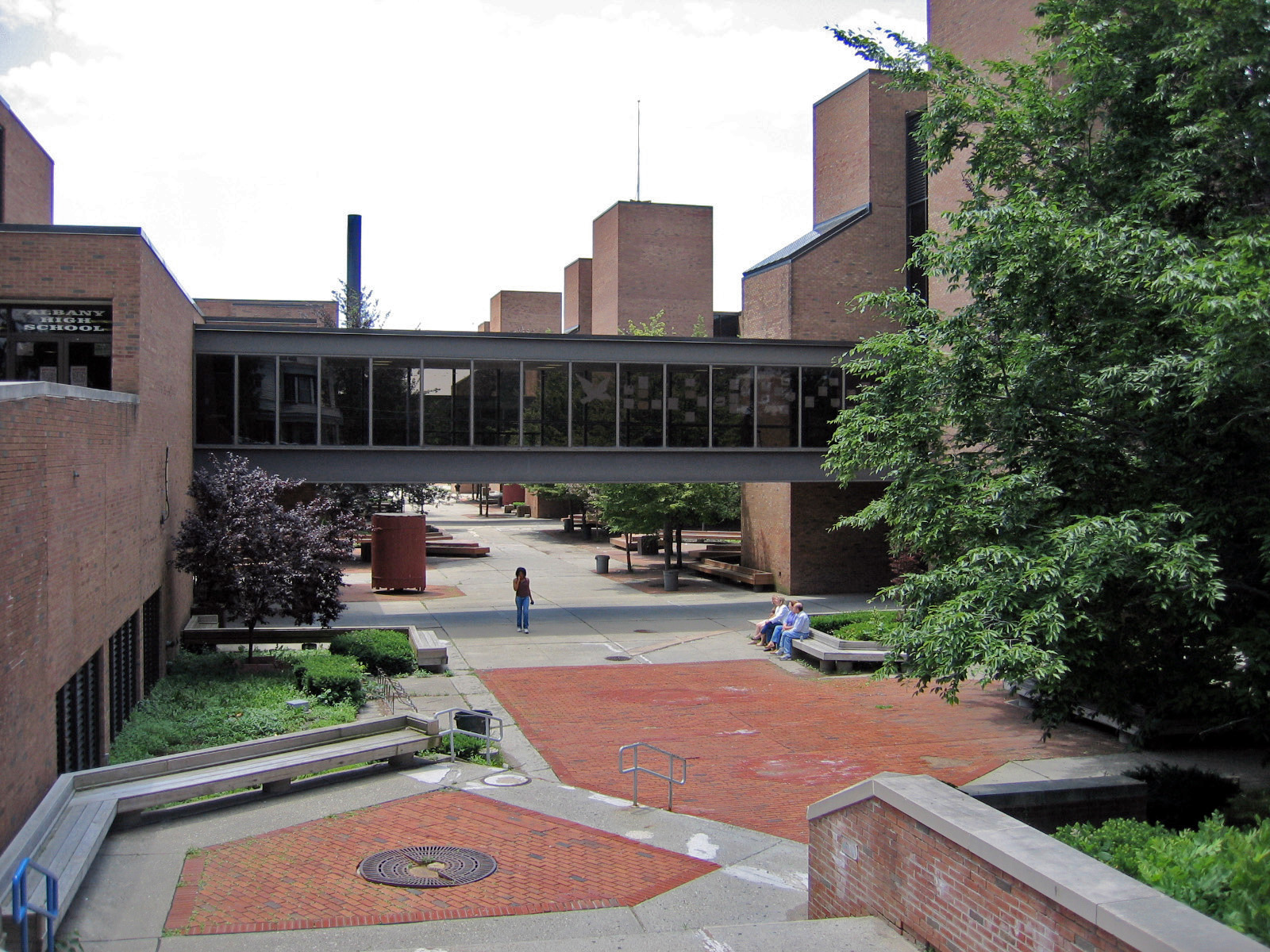
Albany High School is the central high school of the City School District of Albany.

The City School District of Albany (CSDA) operates the city's public school system, which consists of 17 schools and learning centers; in addition, there are 7 charter schools, including Green Tech Charter High School, and Albany Leadership High School. (Note: Albany was once home to 12 charter schools until the closing of New Covenant Charter School in 2010. It was announced in July 2010 that the Harriet Gibbons High School, an alternative high school for at-risk ninth graders, would close after a negative report from the State Department of Education demanded the elimination of ineffective programs.) In the 2015–2016 school year, over 9,000 students were enrolled in the public school system. The district had an average class size of 18, an 81-percent graduation rate, (Note: The Accountability and Overview Report puts the class of 2009 at 513 students and the Comprehensive Information Report states that 416 of them graduated.) and a 5-percent dropout rate. The district's 2010–11 budget is $202.8 million. Although considered by the state to be one of the lowest-achieving high schools in New York, Albany High was listed as the nation's 976th best high school in a 2010 Newsweek/Washington Post report. Albany also has a number of private schools, including the coed Bishop Maginn High School and Albany Free School; the all-boys Albany Academy; (Note: Christian Brothers Academy was located in various Albany locations throughout the 19th century and then moved to the University Heights neighborhood in 1937. The school moved out of the city to Colonie in 1998 and has remained there since.) and the all-girls Academy of the Holy Names and Albany Academy for Girls.

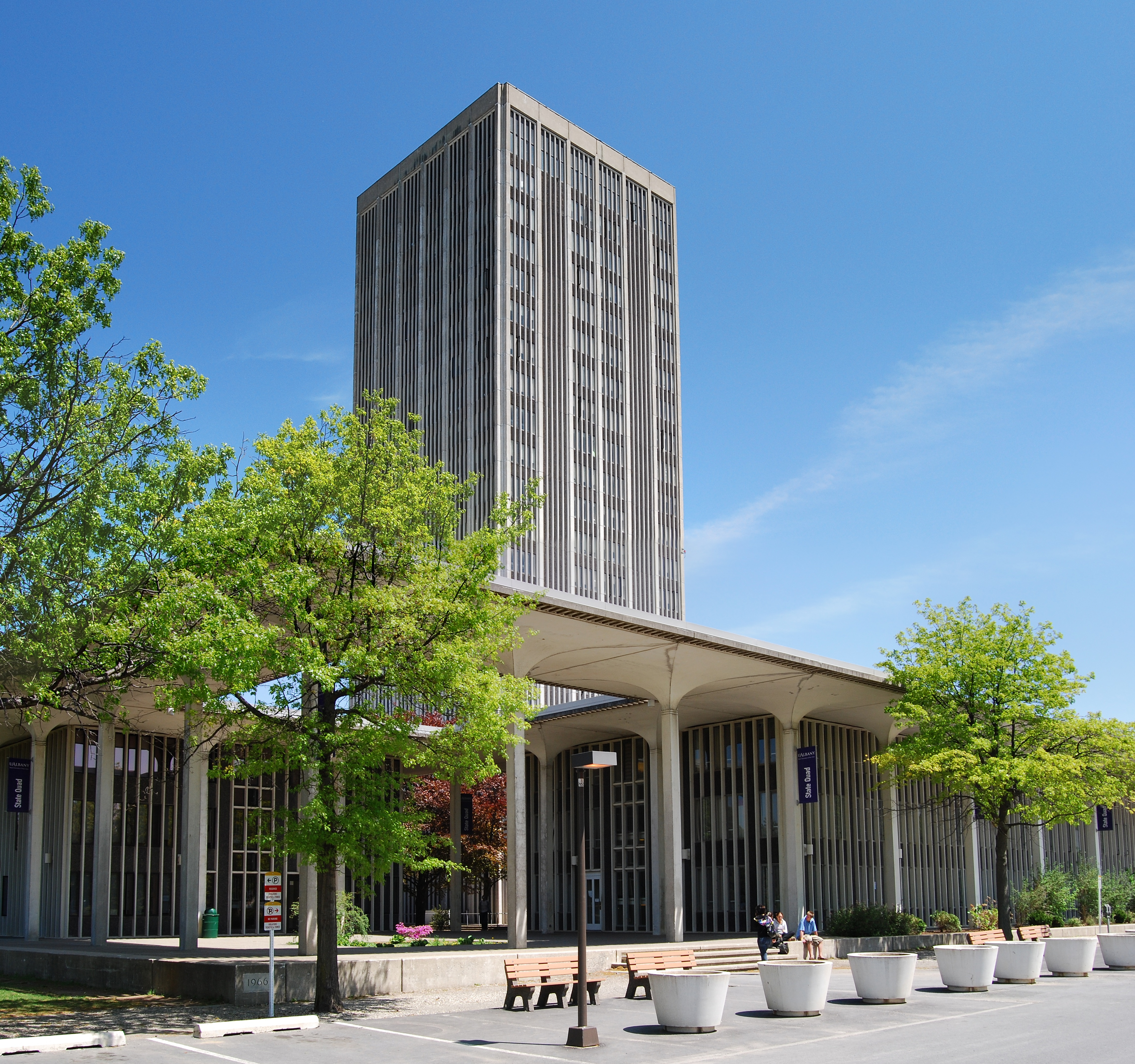
State Quad is one of the four dormitory towers at SUNY Albany's Uptown Campus.

The Albany Medical College (private), today part of Albany Medical Center, was founded in 1839. Albany Law School (private) is the oldest law school in New York and the fourth-oldest in the country; it was opened in 1851. President William McKinley was an alumnus. The Albany College of Pharmacy and Health Sciences (private) is the second-oldest pharmacy school in New York and the fifteenth-oldest in the United States.

The New York State Normal School, one of the oldest teachers colleges in the United States, opened in 1844; it was later known as the State Teachers College. It eventually evolved into the University at Albany, also known as SUNY Albany (public), which inherited the Normal School's original downtown campus on Western Avenue. The center of the campus moved to its current Uptown Campus in the west end of the city in 1970. SUNY Albany is a unit of the State University of New York and one of only four university centers in the system. Other colleges and universities in Albany include Empire State College, The College of Saint Rose, Excelsior College, Maria College, Mildred Elley, and Sage College of Albany. Nearby Hudson Valley Community College (HVCC) fills the community college niche in the Albany-Troy area. The effect of the campuses on the city's population is substantial: Combining the student bodies of all the aforementioned campuses (except HVCC) results in 63,149 students, or almost 70 percent of the 2008 estimate of Albany's permanent population.

== Media ==
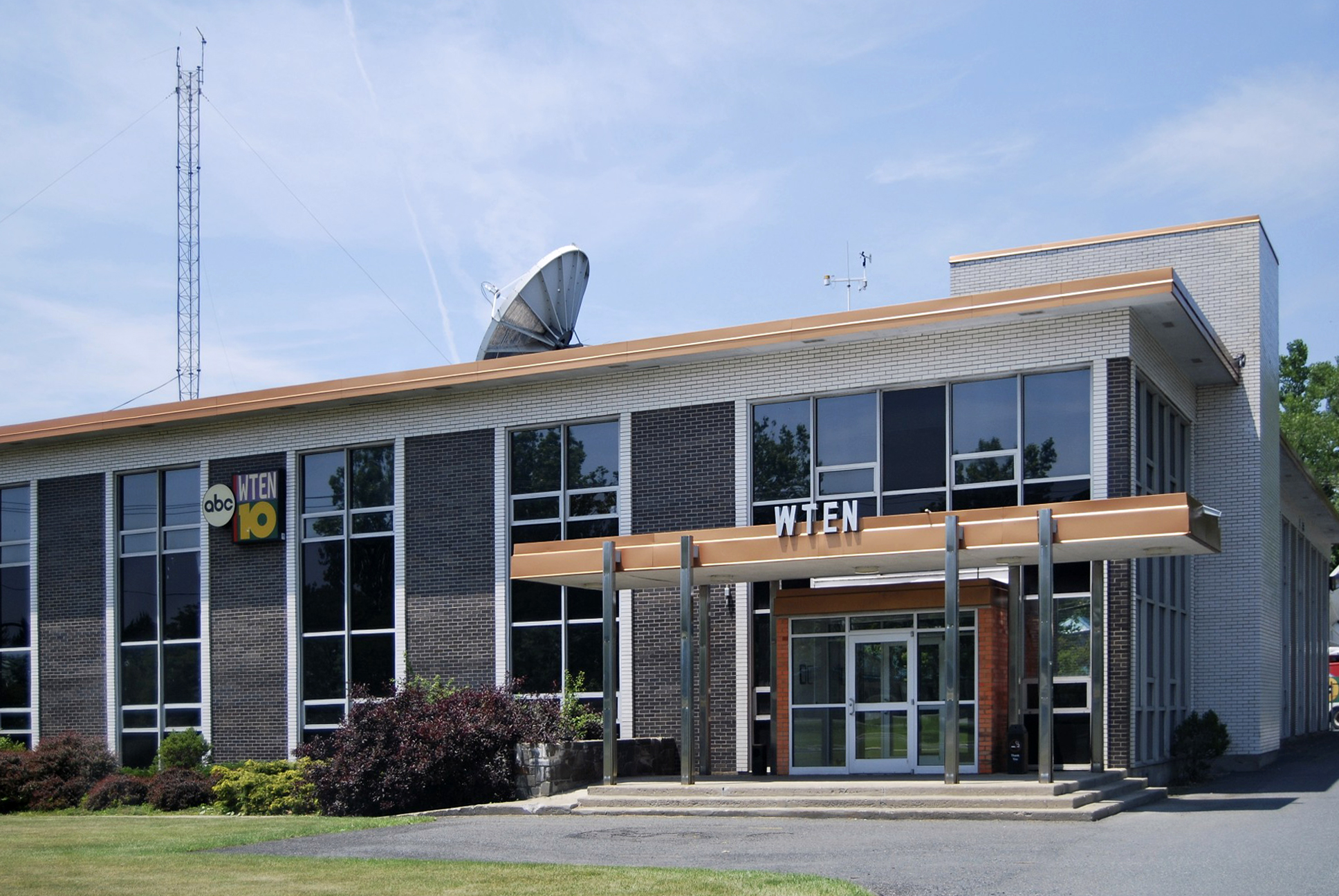
WTEN (headquarters pictured), WXXA, and Spectrum News broadcast from within city limits.

The Times Union is Albany's primary daily newspaper and the only one based close to the city; its headquarters moved from within city limits to suburban Colonie in the 1960s after a dispute with Mayor Corning over land needed for expansion. Its circulation totals about 73,000 on weekdays and 143,000 on Sundays. Serving Albany to a lesser degree are The Daily Gazette, based in Schenectady, and The Record, of Troy. Metroland is the alternative newsweekly in the area, publishing each Thursday, while The Business Review is a business weekly published each Friday. The Legislative Gazette, another weekly newspaper, focuses exclusively on issues related to the Legislature and the state government.

As of 2010, the Albany-Schenectady-Troy media market is the 63rd-largest in the country in terms of radio and the 57th-largest in terms of television audiences. It is a broadcast market with historical significance. The pioneering influence of General Electric in Schenectady directly contributed to the area emerging as the birthplace of station-based television with WRGB; the station was also the first affiliate of NBC. In 1947, the region was home to the first independently owned and operated commercial FM radio station in the United States: W47A. WGY was the second commercial radio station in New York and the twelfth in the nation. The Capital District is home to ABC affiliate WTEN 10, CBS affiliate WRGB 6 (also operating CW affiliate WCWN 45), Fox affiliate WXXA 23, NBC affiliate WNYT 13 (also operating MyNetworkTV affiliate WNYA 51), and PBS member station WMHT 17. Charter Communications hosts Spectrum News Capital Region, the area's only local 24-hour news channel. The area has numerous radio stations.

== Infrastructure ==
=== Transportation ===
==== Highways ====
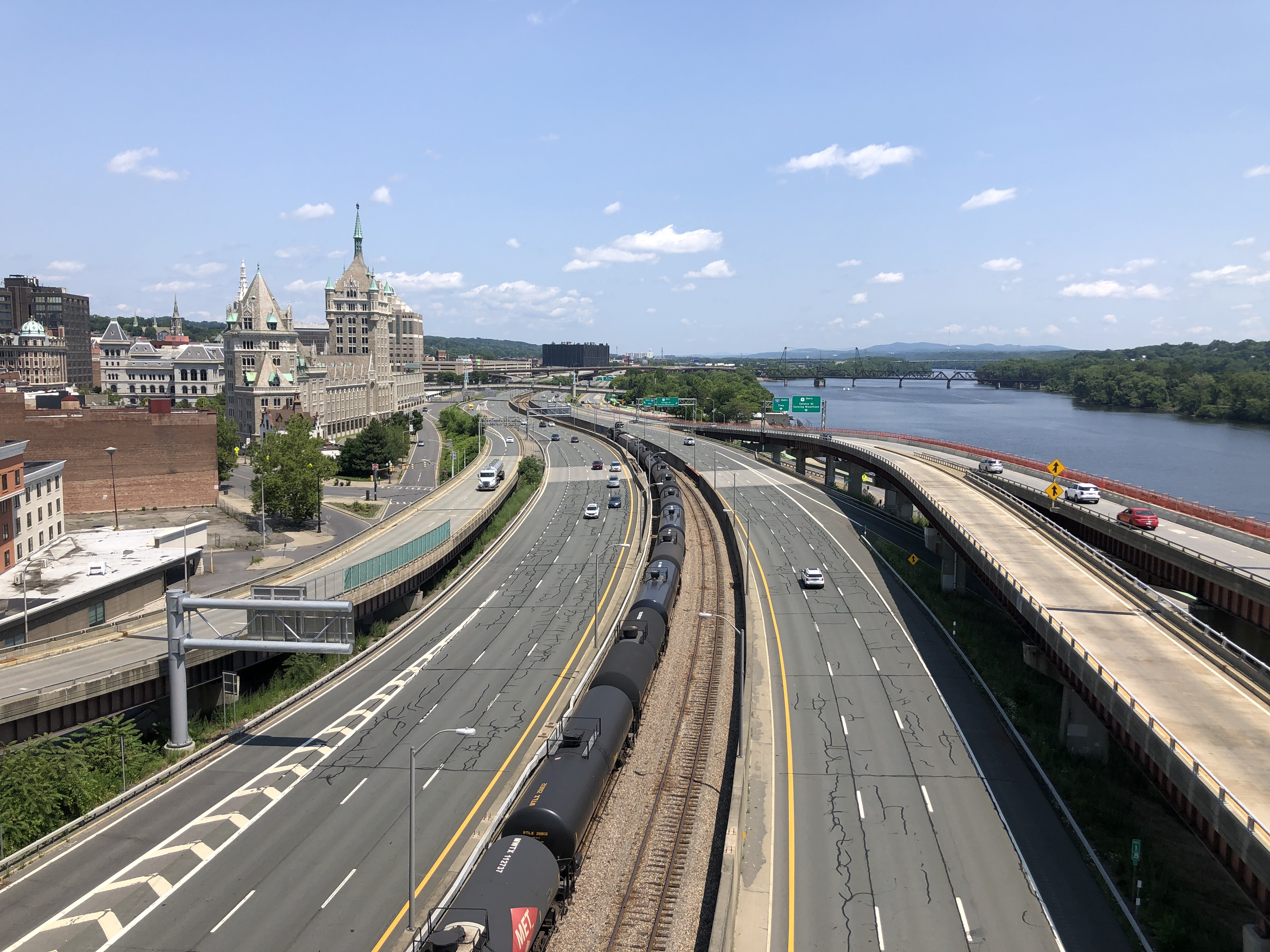
View north along I-787 from the US 9/US 20/South Mall Arterial "circle" interchange in downtown Albany

The New York State Thruway is the most prominent highway serving Albany. From Albany westward, it is part of Interstate 90, connecting Albany with major cities such as Syracuse, Rochester and Buffalo. To the south, it becomes part of Interstate 87 and leads to New York City. A short un-tolled section of Interstate 90 extends around the northern and eastern portions of Albany before linking back up with the Berkshire extension of the Thruway, which leads to the Massachusetts Turnpike and ultimately to Boston. North of Albany, Interstate 87 follows the Northway to Canada at Champlain; Autoroute 15 continues into Quebec, linking Albany to Montreal. Interstate 787 links downtown Albany to the southbound I-87/Thruway to the south, while to the north, it links with the free portion of Interstate 90 before continuing to Troy, Watervliet, Colonie, and Menands. By way of Route 7, I-787 connects to the Northway.

==== Trains ====
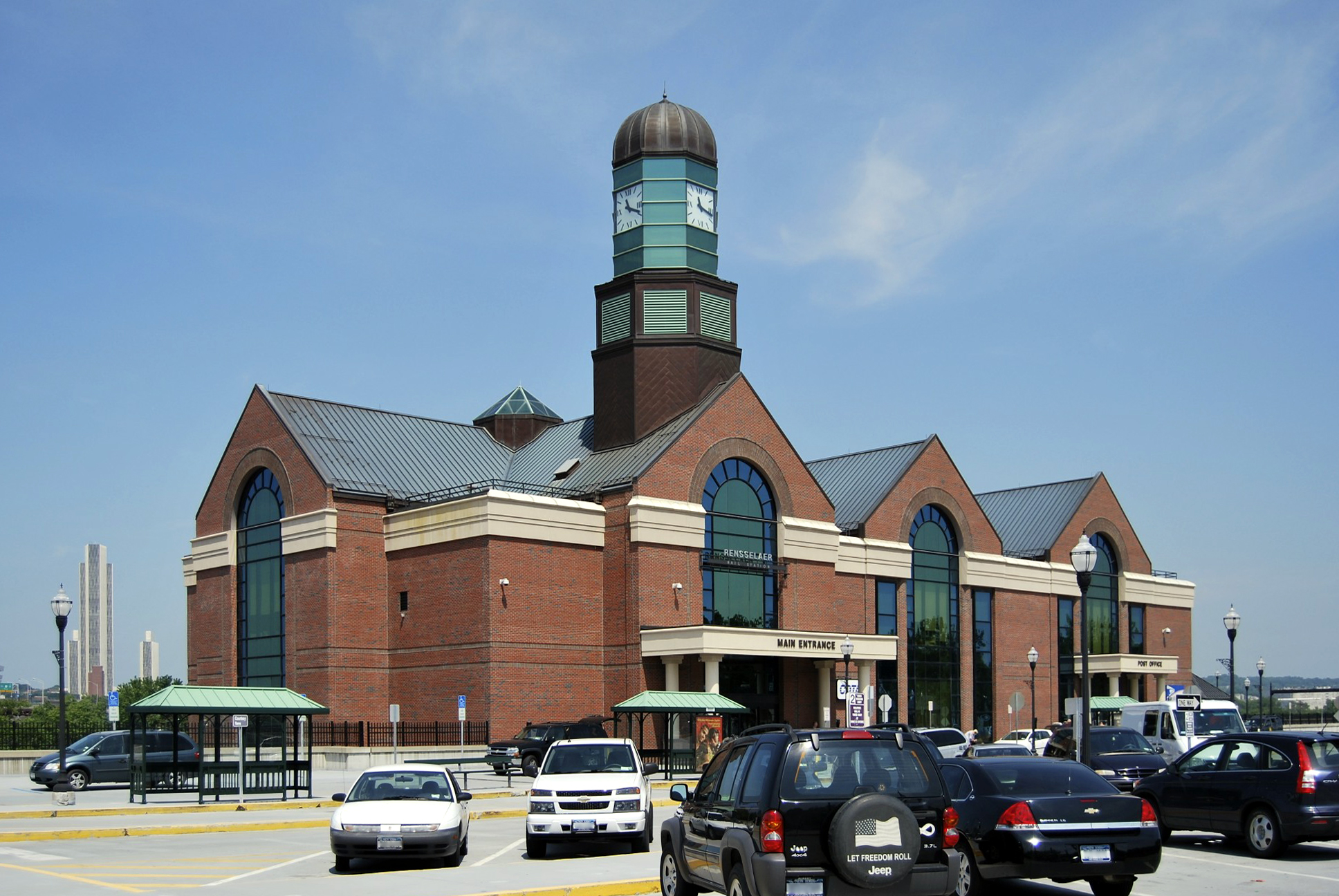
Albany-Rensselaer Amtrak Station

Since the closure of Union Station on Broadway, area passenger-rail service is provided by Amtrak at the Albany-Rensselaer station across the river in Rensselaer. In 2009, the station saw more than 720,000 passengers, making it Amtrak's second-busiest in New York, behind Manhattan's Penn Station. Amtrak provides service south to New York City; north to Montreal, and Burlington (Vermont); west to Niagara Falls, Toronto and Chicago; and east to Boston.

==== Airport ====
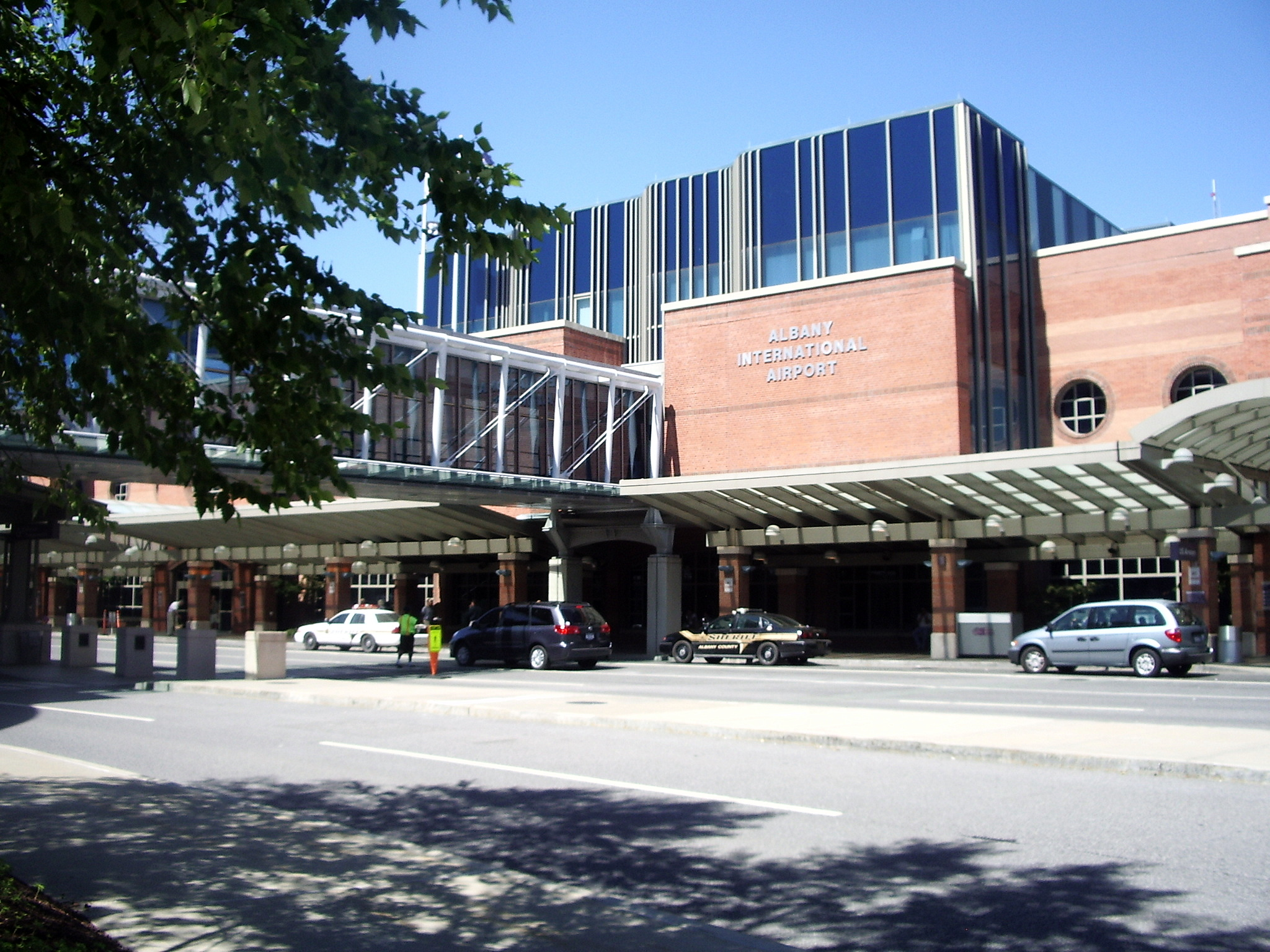
Albany International Airport

Albany's major airport is Albany International Airport in Colonie. Major airline service to Albany includes service by: American Airlines, Delta Air Lines, Southwest Airlines, JetBlue Airways, and United Airlines; Million Air is the local fixed-base operator. In 2010, Albany had the highest average airfare in New York, though the per-mile cost on its busiest routes was second-lowest in the state.

==== Bus ====
The Capital District Transportation Authority (CDTA) provides bus service throughout Albany and the surrounding area, including Schenectady, Troy, and Saratoga Springs. The city was once served by an urban streetcar service maintained by the United Traction Company. As in many American cities, after the advent of the automobile, light rail services declined in Albany and were replaced by bus and taxi services. Greyhound Lines, Trailways, Peter Pan, Short Line, Vermont Translines, and Yankee Trails buses all serve a downtown terminal. Brown Coach provides commuter service. Low-cost curbside bus service from the SUNY Albany campus and the Rensselaer station is also provided by Megabus, with direct service to New York City.

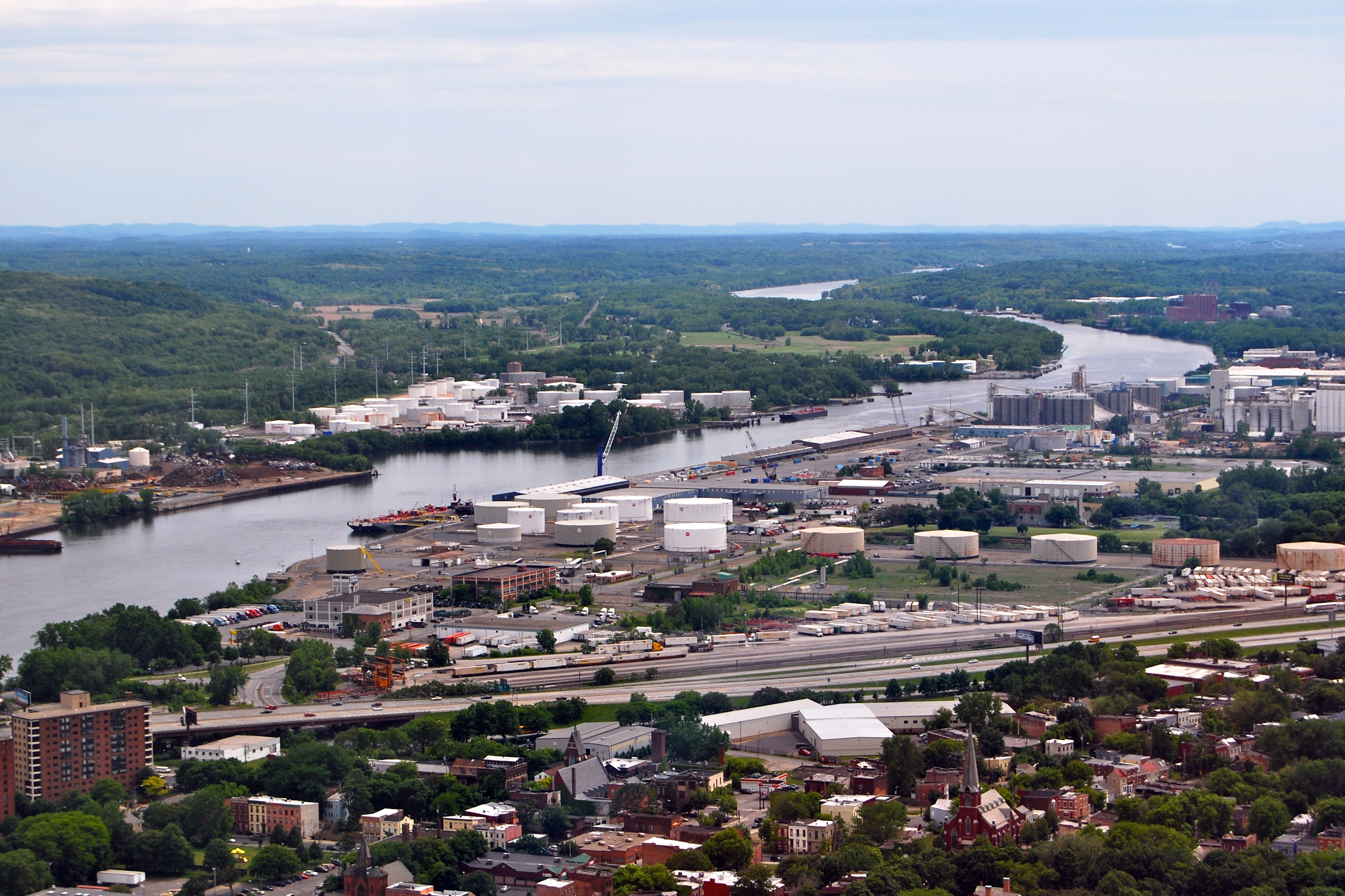
The Port of Albany-Rensselaer adds $428 million to the Capital District's $70.1 billion gross product.

==== Boat ====
Albany, long an important Hudson River port, today serves domestic and international ships and barges through the Port of Albany-Rensselaer, on both sides of the river. The port has the largest mobile harbor crane in the state of New York. The New York State Barge Canal, the ultimate successor of the Erie Canal, is in use today, largely by tourist and private boats.

== Sister cities ==
The city of Nijmegen, Netherlands connected with Albany following World War II. With the help of the Catholic university in Albany, the Catholic University of Nijmegen (Radboud University Nijmegen) rebuilt its partly destroyed library, with over 50,000 books being donated to the Dutch university. To show its gratitude for post-war assistance, the city sent Albany 50,000 tulip bulbs in 1948; this act led to the establishment of the annual Tulip Festival. Most of the other connections were made in the 1980s during Mayor Whalen's term in office as part of his cultural expansion program.

Albany's sister cities are:

- Bucha, Ukraine
- (The Bahamas) Nassau, Bahamas
- Nijmegen, Netherlands
- Tula, Russia
- Verona, Italy
- South Tangerang, Indonesia

== See also ==
- Albany's Golden Cue Billiard Lounge
- List of capitals in the United States
- List of cities in New York
- List of incorporated places in New York's Capital District
- National Register of Historic Places listings in Albany, New York
- Neighborhoods of Albany, New York
- USS Albany, several ships

== Bibliography ==
- Anderson, George Baker (1897). Landmarks of Rensselaer County New York. Syracuse, New York: D. Mason and Company. OCLC 1728151.(Full text via the Internet Archive.)
- Brodhead, John Romeyn (1874). History of the State of New York. New York City: Harper & Brothers, Publishers. OCLC 458890237.
- Burger, Joanna (2006). Whispers in the Pines: a Naturalist in the Northeast. Piscataway, New Jersey: Rutgers University Press. ISBN 0-8135-3794-0.(Full text via Google Books.)
- Chisholm, Hugh, ed. (1911). "Albany (New York)" . Encyclopædia Britannica. Vol. 1 (11th ed.). Cambridge University Press. pp. 489–491.
- French, John Homer (1860). Historical and Statistical Gazetteer of New York State. Syracuse, New York: R. Pearsall Smith. OCLC 224691273.(Full text via Google Books.)
- Grondahl, Paul (2007). Mayor Erastus Corning: Albany Icon, Albany Enigma. Albany: State University of New York Press. ISBN 978-0-7914-7294-1.
- Howell, George Rogers; Jonathan Tenney (1886). Bi-centennial History of Albany: History of the County of Albany, N.Y. from 1609 to 1886 (Volume I). New York City: W. W. Munsell & Co. OCLC 11543538.(Full text via Google Books.)
- Howell, George Rogers; Jonathan Tenney (1886). Bi-centennial History of Albany: History of the County of Albany, N.Y. from 1609 to 1886 (Volume II). New York City: W. W. Munsell & Co. OCLC 11543538.(Full text via Google Books.)
- McEneny, John (2006). Albany, Capital City on the Hudson: An Illustrated History. Sun Valley, California: American Historical Press. ISBN 1-892724-53-7.
- National Municipal League (1896). Proceedings of the Conference for Good City Government and the Annual Meeting of the National Municipal League (Volume 5). Philadelphia: Selheimer Printing Company. pp. 137–148. OCLC 40371852.(Full text via Google Books.)
- Reynolds, Cuyler (1906). Albany Chronicles: A History of the City Arranged Chronologically, From the Earliest Settlement to the Present Time. Albany: J. B. Lyon Company. OCLC 457804870.(Full text via Google Books.)
- Rittner, Don (2002). Then & Now: Albany. Charleston, South Carolina: Arcadia Publishing. ISBN 0-7385-1142-0.
- Rittner, Don (2009). Remembering Albany: Heritage on the Hudson. Charleston, South Carolina: History Press. ISBN 978-1-59629-770-8.
- Venema, Janny (2003). Beverwijck: A Dutch Village on the American Frontier, 1652–1664. Hilversum: Verloren. ISBN 0-7914-6079-7.
- Waite, Diana S. (1993). Albany Architecture: A Guide to the City. Albany: Mount Ida Press. ISBN 0-9625368-1-4.
- Whish, John D. (1917). Albany Guide Book. Albany: J.B. Lyon Company. OCLC 17438709.(Full text via Google Books.)
