= Buckingham Lake =

Lake in Albany, New York, United States

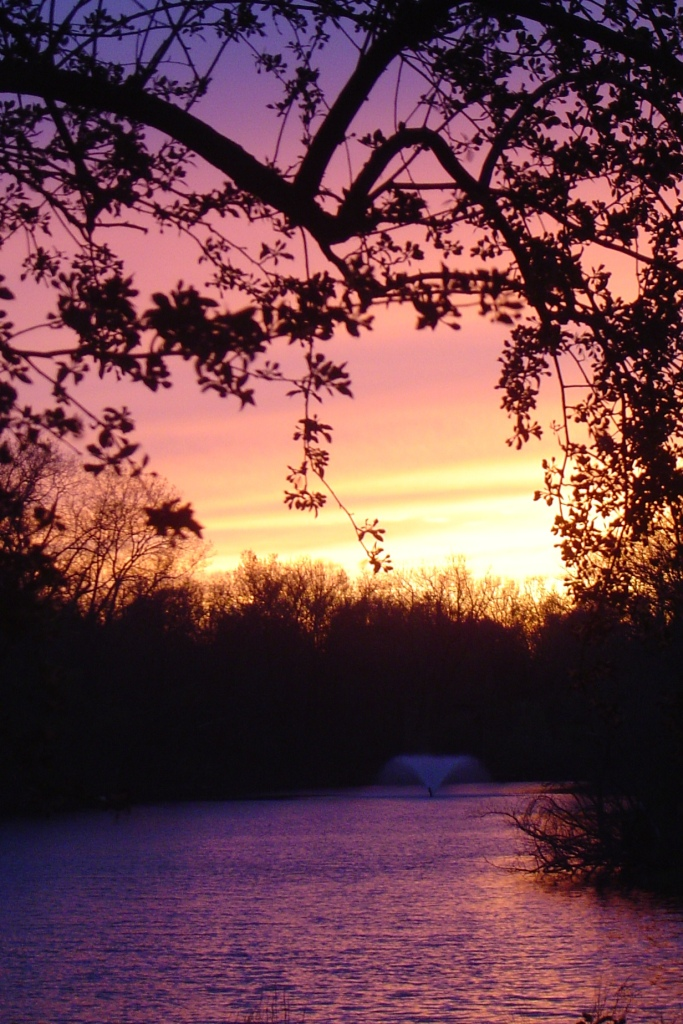
- Sunset

- Location within New York Location within the United States
- Location: Albany, New York
- Coordinates: 42°39′48″N 73°48′23″W
- Basin countries: United States
- Surface area: 5 acres (2.0 ha)
- Max. depth: 5 ft (1.5 m)
- Surface elevation: 210 ft (64 m)

Buckingham Lake, commonly referred to as Buckingham Pond or Rafts Pond, is a body of water located in a residential area of Albany, New York. It has a surface area of 5 acres (20,000 m^{2}) and a mean depth of three feet. The lake is adjacent to Buckingham Lake Park, a small recreation area with picnic tables and playground equipment. Three fountains help aerate water during the warmer months, while ice-skating often takes place on the lake's frozen surface during the winter. Wildlife at the lake includes ducks, Canada geese and red-winged blackbirds. The lake is surrounded by a gravel path that is a few feet wide. Streets that border the lake include Berkshire Boulevard, Euclid Avenue, Lenox Avenue, and Colonial Avenue.
