= Daniel Giraud Elliot Medal =

US award for zoology or paleontology

The Daniel Giraud Elliot Medal is awarded by the U.S. National Academy of Sciences "for meritorious work in zoology or paleontology study published in a three to five year period." Named after Daniel Giraud Elliot, it was first awarded in 1917.

== List of Daniel Giraud Elliot Medal winners ==
Source: National Academy of Sciences

- Terrie M. Williams (2024)

For her seminal work on the ecological physiology of large mammals.

- Günter P. Wagner (2018)

For his fundamental contributions to the integration of developmental and evolutionary biology, including his rich and penetrating book Homology, Genes and Evolutionary Innovation, which will orient research in evolutionary developmental biology for decades to come.

- Jonathan B. Losos (2012)

For his novel and penetrating studies of adaptive radiation in vertebrates, notably his comprehensive study of Anolis lizards in tropical America, as summarized in his recent book, Lizards in an Evolutionary Tree: Ecology and Adaptive Radiation of Anoles ISBN 978-0520269842.

- Jennifer A. Clack (2008)

For studies of the first terrestrial vertebrates and the water-to-land transition, as illuminated in her book Gaining Ground: The Origin and Evolution of Tetrapods ISBN 978-0253356758 .

- Rudolf A. Raff (2004)

For creative accomplishments in research, teaching, and writing (especially The Shape of Life) that led to the establishment of a new field, evolutionary developmental biology.

- Geerat J. Vermeij (2000)

For his extracting major generalizations about biological evolution from the fossil record of a raccoon, by feeling details of shell anatomy that other scientists only see.

- John Terborgh (1996)

For his research on the ecology, sociobiology, biodiversity, and plant phenology of the tropics, and for his 1992 book, Diversity and the Tropical Rain Forest.

- George C. Williams (1992)

For his seminal contributions to current evolutionary thought, including the importance of natural selection and adaptation, and the understanding of sexual reproduction, social behavior, senescence, and disease.

- Jon Edward Ahlquist and Charles G. Sibley (1988)

For their application of DNA hybridization techniques to bird classification which revolutionized taxonomy by showing at last how to distinguish evolutionary relationships from convergent similarities.

- G. Evelyn Hutchinson (1984)

For his work as a limnologist, biochemist, ecologist, evolutionist, art historian, and ranking among our zoological giants.

- G. Arthur Cooper and Richard E. Grant (1979)

For the six-volume treatise on the taxonomy, paleoecology, and evolutionary significance of the West Texas Permian brachiopods.

- Howard E. Evans (1976)

For his work over 25 years on the biology and evolution of behavior in wasps.

- Richard D. Alexander (1971)

For his outstanding fundamental work on the systematic, evolution, and behavior of crickets.

- Ernst Mayr (1967)

For his treatise, "Animal Species and Evolution".

- George G. Simpson (1965)

For his treatise, "Principles of Animal Taxonomy."

- Donald R. Griffin (1958)
- P. Jackson Darlington, Jr. (1957)

For his work on Zoogeography: The Geographical Distribution of Animals was the most meritorious work in zoology published during the year.

- Alfred S. Romer (1956)
- Herbert Friedmann (1955)

For his book, The Honey Guides. Dr Friedman's studies of this little-known African bird clarified several puzzling problems concerning it.

- Sven P. Ekman (1953)
- Archie Fairly Carr (1952)
- Libbie H. Hyman (1951)
- Raymond Carroll Osburn (1950)

In recognition of his studies of Bryozoa, particularly for the volume on Bryozoa of the Pacific Coast of America, part 1, published by the University of Southern California.

- Arthur Cleveland Bent (1949)

For the 17th volume in his series on the Life Histories of the North American Birds, published by the United States National Museum.

- Henry B. Bigelow (1948)

For his contributions to marine zoology, particularly for his part as senior author in the volume Fishes of the Western North Atlantic.

- John T. Patterson (1947)
- Robert Broom (1946)

His volume, The South Africa Fossil Ape-Men, The Australopithecinae, was published on January 31, 1946, by the Transvaal Museum in Pretoria.

- Sewall Wright (1945)

For his fundamental work dealing with the genetics of evolutionary processes—a program based on work over a long period, including his paper "The Differential Equation of the Distribution of Gene Frequencies."

- George G. Simpson (1944)

For his work, Tempo and Mode in Evolution, Columbia University Press, 1944.

- Karl S. Lashley (1943)

For his work, "Studies of Cerebral Function in Learning," Journal of Comparative Neurology, 1943, volume 79.

- D'arcy Thompson (1942)

For his work, On Growth and Form, revised and enlarged, 1942.

- Theodosius Dobzhansky (1941)

His work, Genetics and the Origin of Species, second edition published in 1941.

- William Berryman Scott (1940)

For his work, The Mammalian Fauna of the White River Oligocene. Part IV. Artiodactyia.

- John H. Northrop (1939)

For his work, Crystalline Enzymes: The Chemistry of Pepsin, Trypsin, and Bacteriophage.

- Malcolm Robert Irwin (1938)

For his work, Immunogenetic Studies of Species Relationships in Columbidae.

- George Howard Parker (1937)

For his work "Do Melanophore Nerves Show Antidromic Responses?" Journal of General Physiology, volume 20, July 1937.

- Robert Cushman Murphy (1936)
- Edwin H. Colbert (1935)
- Theophilus S. Painter (1934)
- Richard Swann Lull (1933)
- James P. Chapin (1932)

For his work entitled, The Birds of the Belgian Congo, Part I, was published as a bulletin of the American Museum of Natural History in 1932.

- Davidson Black (1931)
- George E. Coghill (1930)

For his work entitled Correlated Anatomical and Physiological Studies of the Growth of the Nervous System of Amphibia.

- Henry F. Osborn (1929)
- Ernest Thompson Seton (1928)

For his work, Lives of Game Animals, Volume 4.

- Erik A. Stensiö (1926)

For his work, The Downtonian and Devonian Vertebrates of Spitzbergen, Part I.

- Edmund B. Wilson (1925)

For his volume, The Cell in Development and Heredity.

- Henri Breuil (1924)
- Ferdinand Canu (1923)

For his work, North American Later Tertiary and Quaternary Bryozoa.

- William M. Wheeler (1922)

For his work in entomology, Ants of the American Museum Congo Expedition.

- Bashford Dean (1921)

For his volume in ichthyology, Bibliography of Fishes.

- Othenio Abel (1920)
- Robert Ridgway (1919)

For his classic work, Birds of North and Middle America.

- William Beebe (1918)
- Frank M. Chapman (1917)

== See also ==
- List of biology awards
- Prizes named after people
