= Theophilus Painter =

American zoologist

- Born: Theophilus Shickel Painter; August 22, 1889
- Died: October 5, 1969 (aged 80)
- Known for: Sex-determination genes X and Y
- Awards: Daniel Giraud Elliot Medal
- Scientific career
- Fields: Zoology, genetics
- Institutions: University of Texas

Theophilus Shickel Painter (August 22, 1889 – October 5, 1969) was an American zoologist best known for his work on the structure and function of chromosomes, especially the sex-determination genes X and Y in humans. He was the first to discover that human sex was determined by an X/Y heteromorphic chromosomal pair mechanism. He also carried out work in identifying genes in fruit flies (Drosophila). His work exploited the giant polytene chromosomes in the salivary glands of Drosophila and other Dipteran larvae. Painter was elected to the United States National Academy of Sciences in 1938 and the American Philosophical Society in 1939.

== Academic administration ==
Painter joined the faculty at the University of Texas in 1916 and, except for military duty during World War I, stayed there his whole career. He was, in succession, associate professor, professor and distinguished professor of zoology. He served as acting president (1944–1946) and president (1946–1952) of the University of Texas and retired from active teaching in 1966.

== Racial segregation ==
Painter was president of the University of Texas when Texas resident Heman Marion Sweatt applied for and was denied admission due to his race. Painter spoke out against integration, and voiced his disapproval of Sweatt's admittance. Sweatt v. Painter, 339 U.S.629 (1950), which proved an integral stepping stone in the landmark case Brown v. Board of Education of Topeka, Kansas that held that "separate is inherently unequal" and led to the integration of America's public schools.

== Gender research ==
Painter is also known for his early study of human chromosomes. In a paper published in 1923, he first gave the number 24 for the count of human meiotic chromosomes. He had tried to count the tangled mass of chromosomes he could see under a microscope in spermatocytes in slices of testicle and arrived at the figure of 24. Others later repeated his experiment in other ways and agreed upon the number of 24. Popular thinking held that if there were 24 chromosomes in spermatocytes, there must be an equal number contributed by the female and the human chromosome number must be 48, which was undisputed for more than 30 years. Then in 1955, Joe Hin Tjio and Albert Levan, using more advanced techniques, looked at the chromosomes in human somatic cells and found 46 chromosomes and the human chromosome number was finally revised.

In 1934 Painter was awarded the Daniel Giraud Elliot Medal from the National Academy of Sciences.

== See also ==
- Argument from authority § Use in science
- Chromosome § Historical note
