= Sven P. Ekman =

Swedish ostracodologist

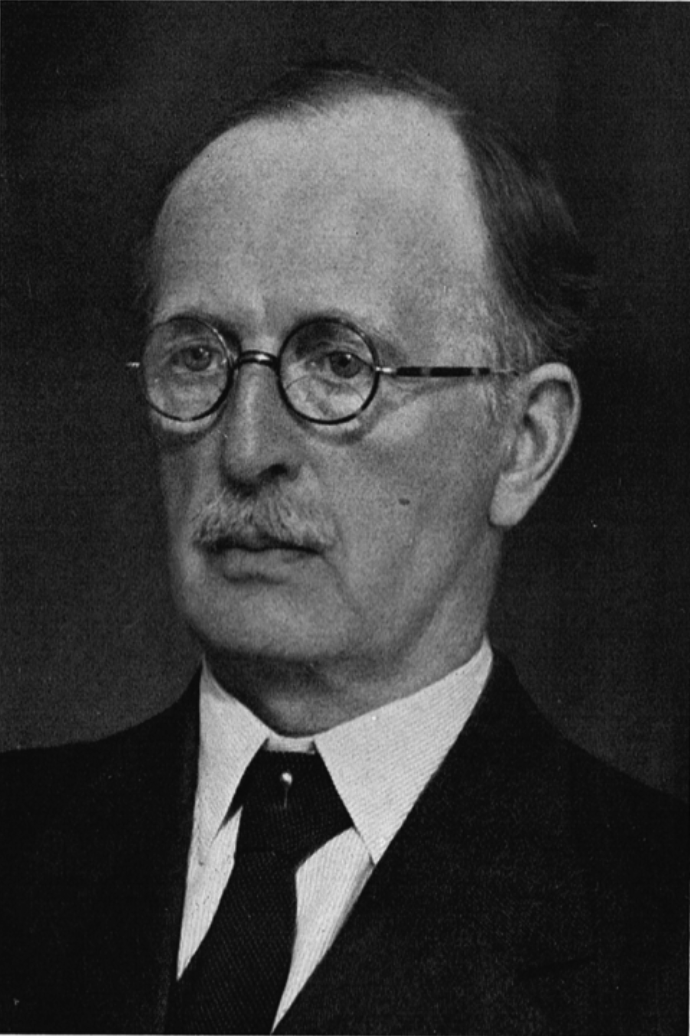
Sven Petrus Ekman

Sven Petrus Ekman (31 May 1876, Uppsala – 2 February 1964, Uppsala) was a Swedish zoologist, biogeographer, zoogeographer, and limnologist, known for the Ekman grab sampler.

Ekman was the son of the Lutheran pastor Fredrik Ekman and Sofia Ekman, née Svensson. He enrolled at Uppsala University where he received a baccalaureate degree in 1899, a licentiate in 1903, and a doctorate in 1904. He was a lecturer in zoology at Uppsala University from 1904 to 1909 and again from 1916 to 1927. In the intervening years, he taught biology and chemistry at a secondary school in Jönköping from 1909 to 1916. In 1927 he became professor of zoology at Uppsala University; he retired in 1941 as professor emeritus. In 1937 he was elected to the Royal Swedish Academy of Sciences, and in 1939 to the Royal Physiographic Society in Lund.

Ekman rewrote his 1935 German-language book Tiergeographie des Meeres in Swedish and had it translated into English with the title Zoogeography of the Sea (1953). He received the Daniel Giraud Elliot Medal in 1953 for Zoogeography of the Sea.

The Russian marine scientist, A. I. Kafanov (2006) wrote about the contributions of "Sven Ekman on the 130th anniversary of his birth in the Russian Journal of Marine Biology, especially biogeography and a passage from that article is quoted here:

As a zoologist, Ekman primarily specialized in studies of freshwater and brackish water crustaceans. He was the author of the first systematized treatise on historical marine biogeography. ... He was the editor of the Swedish edition of the extremely popular "Brehms Thierleben" ("Brehm's Life of Animals") by Alfred Brehm.

Ekman was from 1905 married to Frida Bengtsson (1881–1961). They are buried at Uppsala old cemetery. Their son was the artist Erik Ekman (1906–1986).

== See also ==
- Van Veen Grab Sampler
