= Red-winged blackbird =

Red-winged blackbird Temporal range: Pleistocene–present
- Male in Ocean City, New Jersey
- Female in Connecticut

Conservation status
- Least Concern (IUCN 3.1)

Scientific classification
- Kingdom: Animalia
- Phylum: Chordata
- Class: Aves
- Order: Passeriformes
- Family: Icteridae
- Genus: Agelaius
- Species: A. phoeniceus

Binomial name
- Agelaius phoeniceus (Linnaeus, 1766)

Subspecies
- A. p. aciculatus A. p. arctolegus A. p. arthuralleni A. p. brevirostris A. p. bryanti A. p. californicus A. p. caurinus A. p. floridanus A. p. fortis A. p. grinnelli A. p. gubernator A. p. littoralis A. p. mailliardorum A. p. mearnsi A. p. megapotamus A. p. nelsoni A. p. neutralis A. p. nevadensis A. p. nyaritensis A. p. phoeniceus A. p. richmondi A. p. sonoriensis
- Range of A. phoeniceus Breeding range Wintering range Year-round range

Synonyms
- Oriolus phoeniceus Linnaeus, 1766

Species of bird in North and Central America

The red-winged blackbird (Agelaius phoeniceus) is a passerine bird of the family Icteridae found in most of North America and much of Central America. It breeds from Alaska and Newfoundland south to Florida, the Gulf of Mexico, Mexico, and Guatemala, with isolated populations in western El Salvador, northwestern Honduras, and northwestern Costa Rica. It may winter as far north as Pennsylvania and British Columbia, but northern populations are generally migratory, moving south to Mexico and the Southern United States.

Claims have been made that it is the most abundant living land bird in North America, as bird-counting censuses of wintering red-winged blackbirds sometimes show that loose flocks can number in excess of a million birds per flock, and the full number of breeding pairs across North and Central America may exceed 250 million in peak years. It also ranks among the best-studied wild bird species in the world. The red-winged blackbird is sexually dimorphic; the male is all black with a red shoulder and yellow wing bar, while the female is a nondescript dark brown. Seeds and insects make up the bulk of the red-winged blackbird's diet.

== Taxonomy ==
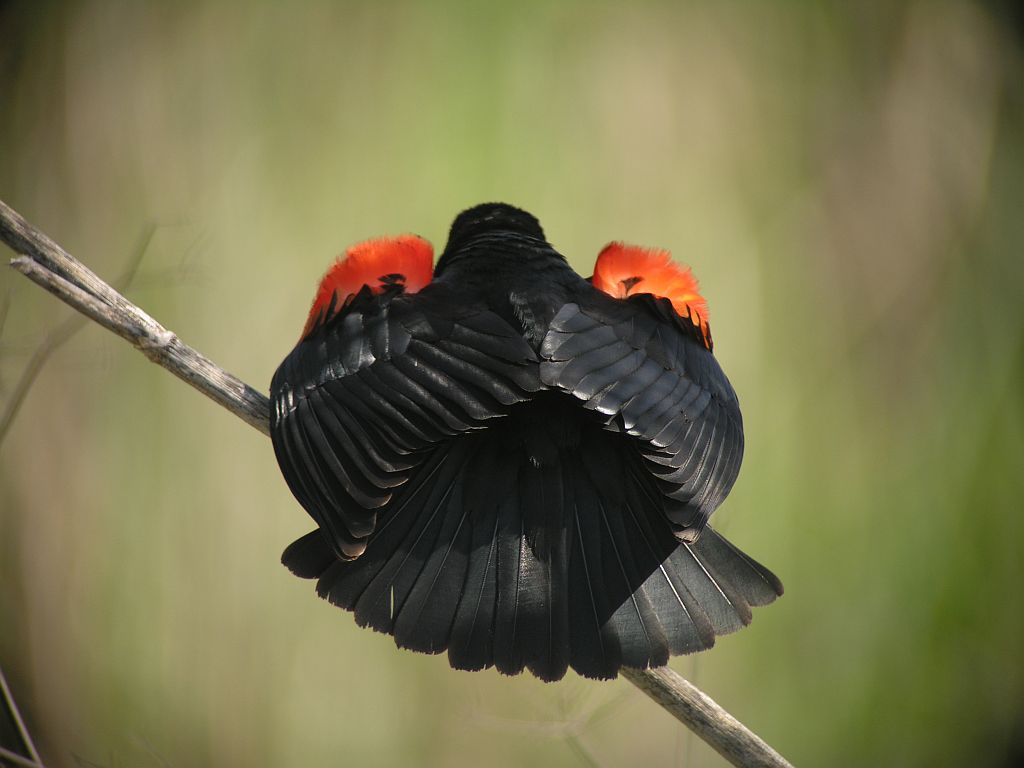
Male seen from behind, showing the absence of the typical yellow bands below the red spots

The red-winged blackbird is one of five species in the genus Agelaius and is included in the family Icteridae, which is made up of passerine birds found in North and South America.

The red-winged blackbird was formally described as Oriolus phoeniceus by Carl Linnaeus in 1766 in the 12th edition of his Systema Naturae, but was later moved with the other American blackbirds to the genus Agelaius by Louis Pierre Vieillot in 1816. Linnaeus specified the type location as "America" but this was restricted to Charleston, South Carolina in 1928.

The red-winged blackbird is a sister species to the red-shouldered blackbird (A. assimilis) that is endemic to Cuba. These two species are together sister to the tricolored blackbird (A. tricolor) that is found on the Pacific coast region of the California and upper Baja California in Mexico.

=== Etymology ===
The genus name is derived from Ancient Greek agelaios, meaning "gregarious". The specific epithet, phoeniceus, is Latin meaning "crimson" or "red".

=== Subspecies ===
Depending on the authority, between 20 and 24 subspecies are recognised; most are quite similar in appearance. Two isolated populations of bicolored blackbirds, though, are quite distinctive: A. p. californicus of California and A. p. gubernator of central Mexico. The taxonomy and relationships between these two populations and with red-winged blackbirds is still unclear. Despite the similarities in most forms of the red-winged blackbird, in the subspecies of Mexican Plateau, A. p. gubernator, the female's veining is greatly reduced and restricted to the throat; the rest of the plumage is very dark brown, and also in a different family from the European redwing and the Old World common blackbird, which are thrushes (Turdidae).

In the California subspecies, A. p. californicus and A. p. mailliardorum, the veining of the female specimens also covers a smaller surface and the plumage is dark brown, although not in the A. p. gubernator grade; and also its superciliary list is absent or poorly developed. The male subspecies A. p. mailliardorum, californicus, aciculatus, neutralis, and gubernator lack the yellow band on the wing that is present in most male members of the other subspecies. The red-shouldered blackbird was formerly considered as a subspecies of red-winged blackbird. They were split by the American Ornithologists' Union in 1997.

Listed below are the red-winged blackbird subspecies and groups of subspecies recognized as of January 2014 with their respective distribution areas and the location of their wintering quarters:

- Group phoeniceus:
  - A. p. arctolegus – from southeastern Alaska and Yukon to the north-central United States; migrates to the south-central United States.
  - A. p. fortis – from Montana to southeastern New Mexico (east of the Rocky Mountains); migrates to Texas.
  - A. p. nevadensis – from southeastern British Columbia to Idaho, southeastern California, and southern Nevada; migrates to southern Arizona.
  - A. p. caurinus – from the southwest coast of British Columbia to northwest California; migrates to central California.
  - A. p. aciculatus – mountains of central-southern California (central-eastern Kern County).
  - A. p. neutralis – from the coast of southern California (San Luis Obispo County) to the northwest of Baja California.
  - A. p. sonoriensis – from southeastern California to northeast Baja California, southern Nevada, central Arizona, and northwest Mexico.
  - A. p. nyaritensis – coastal plains of southwestern Mexico (Nayarit).
  - A. p. grinnelli – Pacific Slope from western Guatemala to northwest Costa Rica (Guanacaste).
  - A. p. phoeniceus – from southeastern Canada to Texas and the southeastern United States.
  - A. p. littoralis – Gulf Coast from Southeast Texas to Northwest Florida.
  - A. p. mearnsi – extreme southeast Georgia and northern Florida.
  - A. p. floridanus – South Florida (Everglades to Key West).
  - A. p. megapotamus – from central Texas and the lower Rio Bravo valley to eastern Mexico (northern Veracruz).
  - A. p. richmondi – Caribbean slope from Mexico (southern Veracruz) to Belize and northern Guatemala.
  - A. p. pallidulus – southeast Mexico (north of the Yucatán Peninsula).
  - A. p. nelsoni – south-central Mexico (from Morelos and the adjacent Guerrero west of Puebla and Chiapas).
  - A. p. matudae – tropical southeast Mexico (not always recognised).
  - A. p. arthuralleni – northern Guatemala.
  - A. p. brevirostris – Caribbean slope of Honduras and southeastern Nicaragua (sometimes included in richmondi).
  - A. p. bryanti – northwest Bahamas.
- Group californicus/ mailliardorum:
  - A. p. mailliardorum – Central California Coast.
  - A. p. californicus – Central Valley of California.
- Group gubernator:
  - A. p. gubernator – Mexican Plateau (Durango to Zacatecas, Mexico and Tlaxcala).

== Description ==
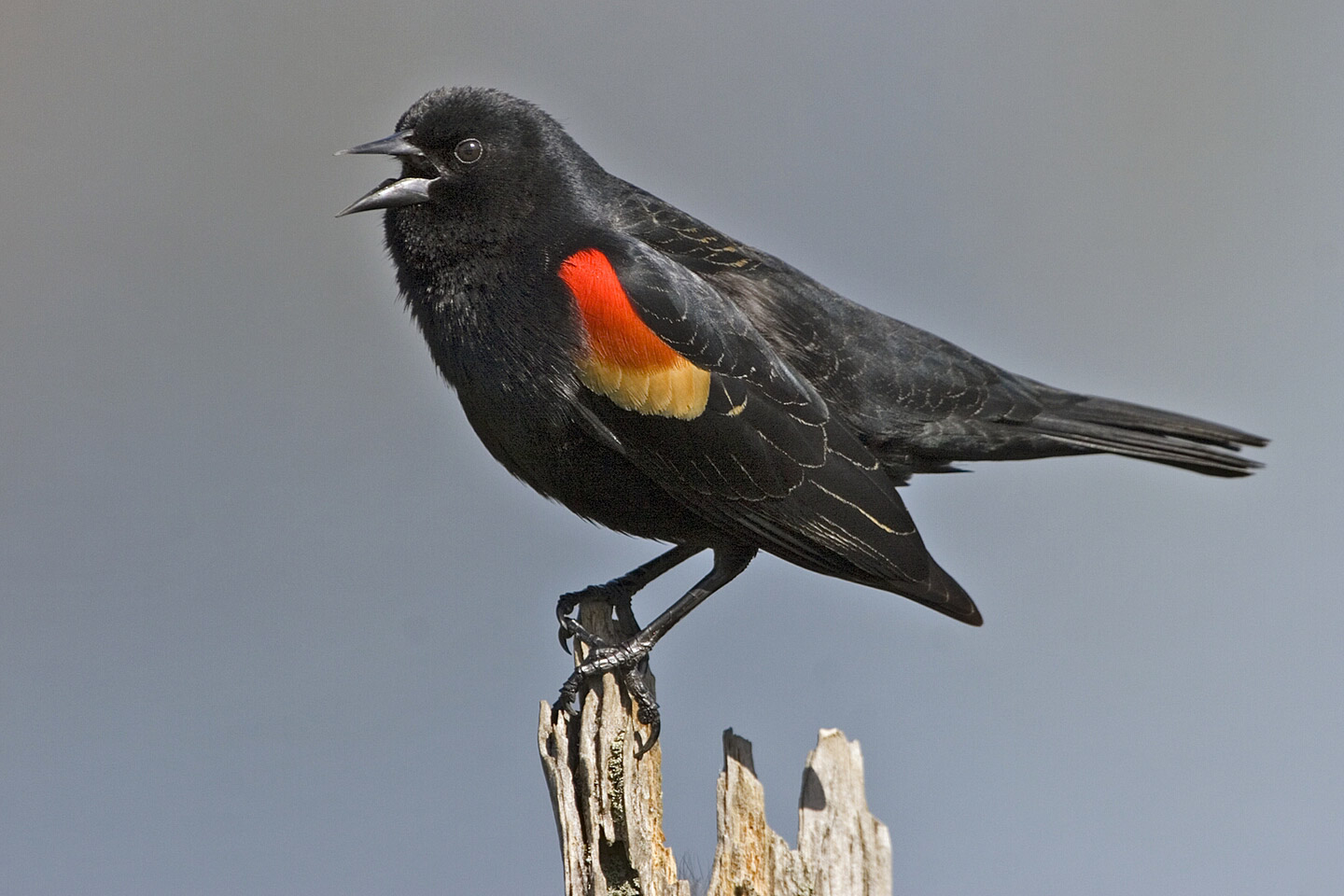
Male displaying his characteristic predominantly black plumage with the red spot on the wing bordered by the yellow band

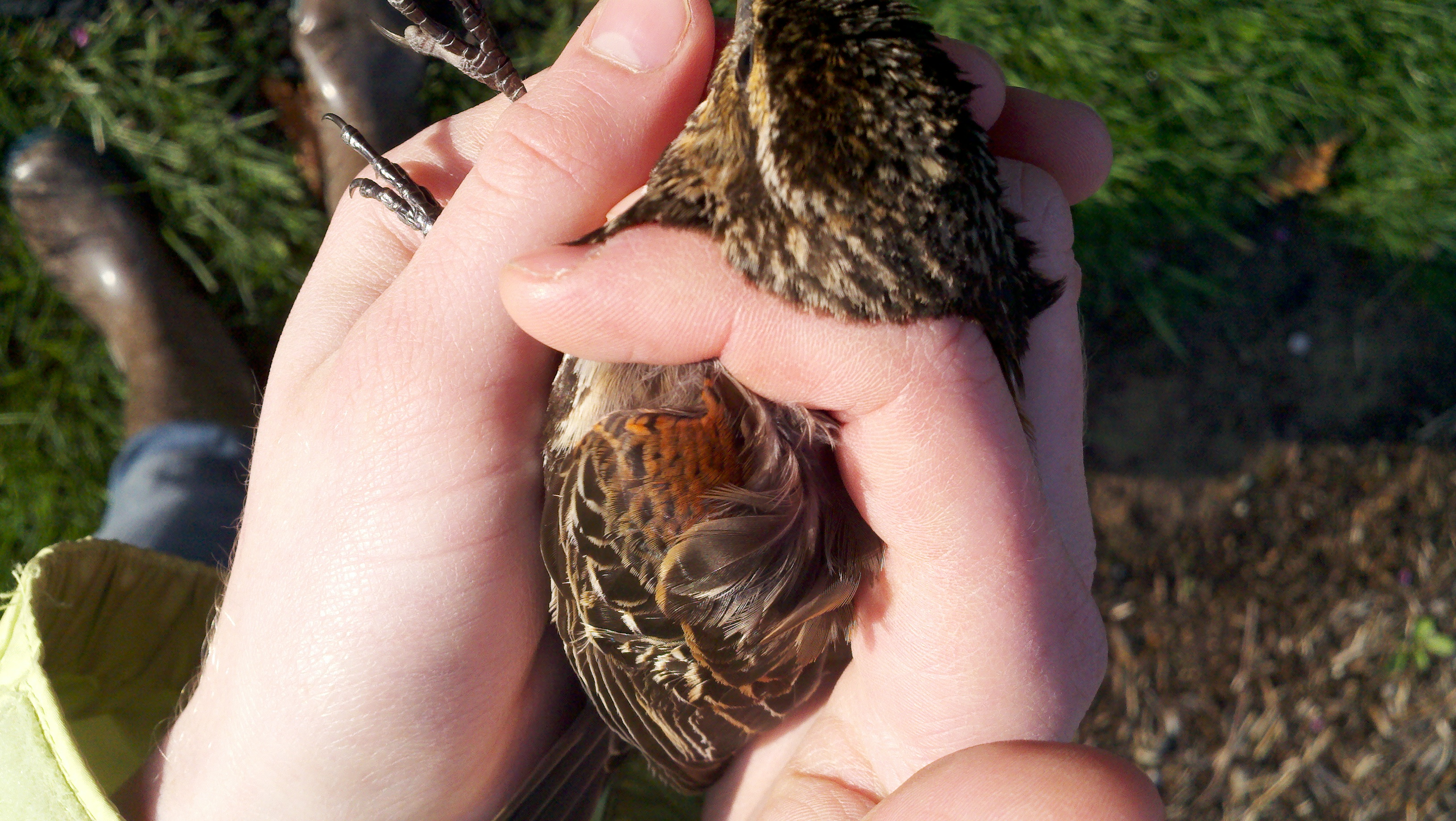
The golden coloration on the wing of the female red-winged blackbird

The common name for the red-winged blackbird is taken from the mainly black adult male's distinctive red shoulder patches, or epaulets, which are visible when the bird is flying or displaying. At rest, the male also shows a pale yellow wingbar. The spots of males less than one year old, generally subordinate, are smaller and more orange than those of adults. The female is blackish-brown and paler below. The female is smaller than the male, at 17–18 cm (6.7–7.1 in) long and weighing 41.5 g (1.46 oz), against his length of 22–24 cm (8.7–9.4 in) and weight of 64 g (2.3 oz). The smallest females may weigh as little as 29 g (1.0 oz) whereas the largest males can weigh up to 82 g (2.9 oz). Each wing can range from 8.1–14.4 cm (3.2–5.7 in), the tail measures 6.1–10.9 cm (2.4–4.3 in), the culmen measures 1.3–3.2 cm (0.51–1.26 in) and the tarsus measures 2.1 cm (0.83 in). The upper parts of the female are brown, while the lower parts are covered by an intense white and dark veining; also presents a whitish superciliary list.

According to Crawford (1977), females exhibit a salmon-pink stain on the shoulders and a light pink color on the face and below this when they are a year old, while older females show a stain usually more crimson on the shoulders and a darker pink hue on and under the face. Observations in females in captivity indicate that small amounts of yellow pigment are present on the shoulders of these after leaving the nest, that the concentration of the pigment increases with the first winter plumage after the change of the feathers and that the passage from yellow to orange generally takes place in the second summer with the acquisition of the second winter plumage, after which no further changes in feather color occur. The colored area on the wing increases in surface with the age of the female, and varies in intensity from brown to a bright red-orange similar to that of the males in their first year.

Young birds resemble the female, but are paler below and have buff feather fringes. Both sexes have a sharply pointed bill. The tail is of medium length and is rounded. The eyes, bill, and feet are all black. Unlike most North American passerines which develop their adult plumage in their first year of life so that the one-year-old and the oldest individual are indistinguishable in the breeding season, the red-winged blackbird does not. It acquires its adult plumage only after the breeding season of the year following its birth when it is between thirteen and fifteen months of age. Young males go through a transition stage in which the wing spots have an orange coloration before acquiring the most intense tone typical of adults.

The male measures between 22 and 24 cm (8.7 and 9.4 in) in length, while the female measures 17 or 18 cm (6.7 or 7.1 in). Its wingspan is between 31 and 40 cm (12 and 16 in) approximately. Both the peak male and the legs, the claws and the eyes are black; in the female beak is dark brown and clear in the upper half at the bottom, and the tail is medium in length and rounded. As in other species polygyny exists, the red-winged blackbird exhibit considerable sexual dimorphism both in plumage and size, males weighing between 65 and 80 g (2.3 and 2.8 oz) the females about 35 g (1.2 oz). Males are 50% heavier than females, 20% larger in its linear dimensions, and 20% larger compared to the length of their wings. The trend towards greater dimorphism in the size of non-monogamous ichterid species indicates that the larger size of males has evolved due to sexual selection.

The male is unmistakable except in the far west of the US, where the tricolored blackbird occurs. Males of that species have a darker red epaulet edged with white, not yellow. Females of tricolored, bicolored, red-shouldered and red-winged blackbirds can be difficult to identify in areas where more than one form occurs. In flight, when the field marks are not easily seen, the red-winged blackbird can be distinguished from less closely related icterids such as common grackle and brown-headed cowbird by its different silhouette and undulating flight.

=== Staining of red spots and yellow bands ===
Two keto-carotenoids – carotenoid with a ketone group – reds synthesized by the birds themselves – namely astaxanthin and canthaxanthin – are responsible for the bright red color of the wing spots, but two yellow dietary precursor pigments – lutein and zeaxanthin – are also present in moderately high concentrations in red feathers. Astaxanthin is the carotenoid more abundant (35% of the total), followed by lutein (28%), canthaxanthin (23%) and zeaxanthin (12%). Such a balanced combination of dietary precursors and metabolic derivatives in colored feathers is quite unusual, not only within a species as a whole but also in individuals and particular feathers.

After removing the carotenoids in an experiment, the red feathers acquired a deep brown coloration. This is because the feather barbles of the colored spot contain melanin pigments – mainly eumelanin, which was equivalent to 83% of all melanins, but also pheomelanin at a concentration approximately equal to that of carotenoids, which seems to be a rare trait for carotenoid-based ornamental plumage. On the other hand, the feathers of the yellow stripes of the males are devoid of carotenoids – except occasionally when they appear tinged with a pink coloration derived from small amounts of said pigments – and present high concentrations of pheomelanin – 82% of all melanins. Melanin concentrations in the yellow band are even higher than in the red spot.

=== Role of wing spots ===
These markings are vital in the defense of the territory. Males with larger spots are more effective at chasing away their non-territorial rivals and are more successful in contests within aviaries. When the red shoulder patches were dyed black as part of an experiment, 64% of males lost their territories, while only 8% of control subjects did. However, males whose wings had been dyed before they had mated could still attract females and successfully reproduce. In the red-winged blackbird, the spots on the wings are a sign of threat among males and have an unimportant role, if any, in intersex encounters. Therefore, the spots are likely to have evolved in response to pressures linked to intrasexual selection. Additionally, neither the size nor the coloration of the same are linked to the reproductive success of the males with those females that are not their mates, that is, those with which they eventually mate. It has been suggested that also in the case of females, the best explanation for the evolution of a variable coloration in the shoulder spots is that their intensity indicates their physical condition in aggressive encounters between them.

The fact that female red-winged blackbirds do not appear to consistently use variability in the size and color of male wing spots when choosing a mate runs counter to the classic role of carotenoid pigmentation ornamental feathers, mostly used in the attraction of a couple. In turn, its use as a sign of aggressiveness and social status against rival males is not a common trait in carotenoid ornaments. On the other hand, ornaments with a preponderance of melanin do tend to have an important role as an indicator of status in avian populations, so the spots of red-winged blackbirds seem to work more as melanin ornaments than as carotenoids.

=== Vocalizations ===
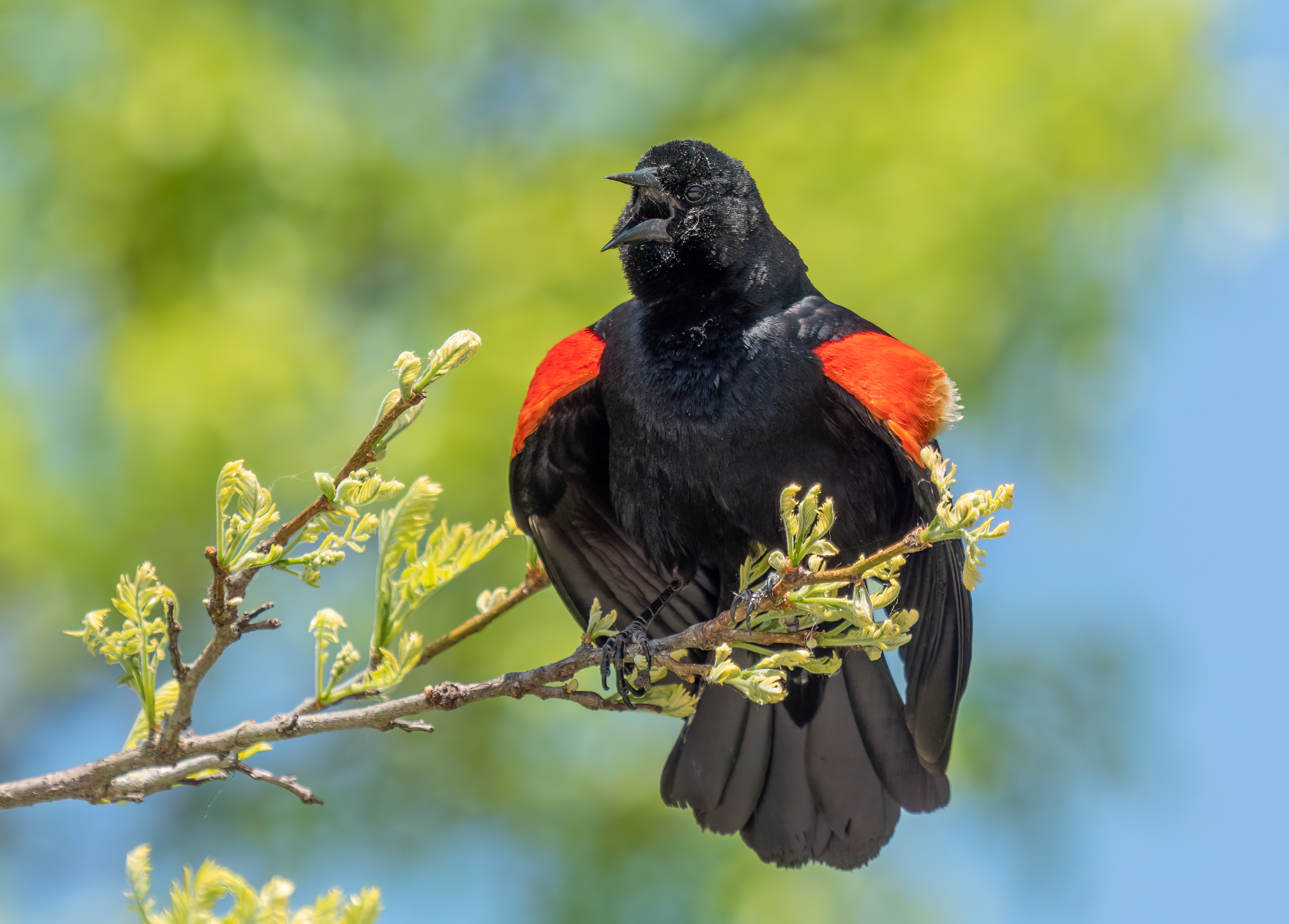
Male red-winged blackbird singing

Vocalizing

Cong-a-lee! call
One of several calls given by a male

Red-winged blackbird

The calls of the red-winged blackbird are a throaty check and a high slurred whistle, terrr-eeee. The male's song, accompanied by a display of his red shoulder patches, is a scratchy oak-a-lee, except that in many western birds, including bicolored blackbirds, it is ooPREEEEEom. The female also sings, typically a scolding chatter chit chit chit chit chit chit cheer teer teer teerr.

== Feather molt ==
The most critical period of feather molting runs from late August to early September. When viewed in flight, they have a misaligned or "moth-eaten" appearance and generally slower and more laborious travel. Their mobility is reduced due to the lack of several remiges or rectrices or these are not entirely renewed. Most of the red-winged blackbirds have moved almost entirely by October. By then, some birds have not completed the molt of the feathers of the capital region and the helmsmen of the center of the tail and the internal secondary sprouts have only partially emerged from the pod. Virtually all individuals have completed their molts by mid-October.

Birds do not begin their migration to wintering quarters until the two outer primary sprouts and the two inner or central rectrices have completed at least two-thirds of their development. Therefore, there is a correlation between molting, particularly replacement of the remiges and rectrices, and fall migration in red-winged blackbirds.

=== Succession of plumages and molts ===
- Juvenile plumage: in both males and females, juvenile plumage is similar in color and pattern to that of the adult female, except for the yellow coloration of the lower body and the sides of the head. The shoulder spots appear mottled and are brown and yellow or brown and beige. Other sources describe the juvenile plumage of the male as follows: above, including the sides of the head, the wings, the tail and the lesser coverts – the feathers of the "shoulders" – dull brownish black – no red at this stage – with beige-bordered feathers, paler and narrower in primaries, rectrices, head, and deeper in the scapulars and secondaries; below, pinkish beige, ochre above chin, densely veined – except chin – with brownish black stripes; undefined ochre-beige supercilious list. The female is described as more brown above with less beige below, with a closely veined chin.
- First pre-basic molt (or post-juvenile molt): Generally begins 45–60 days after individuals have left the nest. The molt begins in August and the time at which it begins varies between early and late clutches. This is a complete molt, except for the retention in some individuals of a few down feathers under the wing.
- Appearance in autumn and winter of the first basic plumage (also called the first winter plumage or immature plumage): in the male, it is black, with the feathers of the upper part bordered with brown or beige and those of the lower part bordered with beige or white. The bird then has a mottled appearance. The shoulder spot is generally orange with black speckles, especially on the yellow stripe. Some immature males have a reddish patch like adults, but with black specks on the yellow band. Others have a blackish spot on the shoulder. Other sources describe the male's first winter plumage as follows: all plumage, including wings and tail, greenish-black, much of it with beige and rust edges, paler underneath and faint or absent in primaries and rectrices; minor wing covers – "shoulders" – orpiment-dull orange, each feather with black subterminal bars or spots; medium beige, deep ocher coverts, generally mottled with black in subterminal areas, mainly in the beards of the inner part of the feathers; generally black spines.

Females are dark above with feathers bordered with beige or rust. The lower part shows black and white streaks, but with more beige on the chest and sometimes on the flanks than in the reproductive plumage. The medium and secondary major cover feathers are noticeably bordered with beige. They generally lack the pink coloration on the chin and throat – which may be beige, yellow, or light salmon – and the crimson wing patch – which may be rust, orange, or gray – typical of second winter plumage.

- Appearance in spring and summer of the first basic plumage (also known as the first breeding plumage or sub-adult plumage): the males, which normally are not yet defending a territory, present a dull black coloration acquired by the wear of the edges of the feathers. The stain alar may be more noticeable than in the first winter plumage due to wear subterminal blacklists, which generally only remain in the form of small black spots. Mottled wing spots are characteristic of young individuals and the extent of orange is highly variable. Females, which are usually already breeding, exhibit plumage similar to the first winter plumage, but darker above due to wear on beige edges or rust on feathers. The chest is less beige, and has a black and white veining.
- Second and subsequent prebasic molts (or postnuptial molts): the second prebasic molt takes place approximately one year after the first. Postnuptial molts constitute complete molts, except for the occasional retention of a few down feathers under the wing.
- Appearance in autumn and winter of the second and subsequent basic plumages (also called adult winter plumage or second winter plumage): the male no longer exhibits the mottled appearance characteristic of the autumn and winter appearance of the first basic plumage. The lower part is almost immaculate and similar to that of the reproductive plumage. The head and back feathers and the secondary covers are bordered with brown and beige. The wing blot becomes bright scarlet-vermilion, while deep ocher beige coloration appears on the medium coats. Other sources describe the adult winter plumage of the male as follows: glossy greenish black; feathers of the head, back, major wing covers and tertiary more or less bordered, depending on the individual, beige and rust; below, paler or absent edges. The female's plumage is similar to the autumn and winter appearance of the first basic plumage, except that the wing spot is generally crimson and the chin and throat pink.
- Aspect in summer and spring of the second and subsequent basic plumages (or adult bridal plumage): it is acquired through the wear of the feathers. is similar to the appearance in the spring and summer of the first basic plumage, but the alar spots of both sexes have a more intense color and chin and throat of the female. The beige and brown edges of the male feathers disappear.

Despite the fact that the brown or white tips on the feathers of the males are larger just after the molt and that they wear out throughout the year, the individuals vary considerably regarding the size of these non-black tips on the feathers in spring.

=== Wing feathers ===
Wing feathers

Complete replacement of wing feathers takes about eight weeks. However, birds in their first year frequently retain some of the under-wing coverts and juvenile tertiary remiges after post-juvenile moulting. Out of 70 immature males examined during the last week of October, 70% retained older lower primary blankets. In most cases where partial replacement of the covert feathers occurs, it is the proximal coverts that the bird retains.

=== Remiges ===
Primary remiges are one of the first feathers to molt. The molt of these feathers proceeds regularly from the innermost primary – primary I – to the outermost – primary IX. By October 1, most birds have either acquired the three new external primaries – VII, VIII, and IX – or they are at some advanced stage of development. The average dates for completion of the development of the new primary springs are: August 15 for primary I; September 1, primary II-IV; September 15, primary V and VI; and October 1, primaries VII-IX.

The molting of the secondary remiges begins with the most external – secondary I – and proceeds inward to secondary VI. The secondary I sheath appears around the same time that all the secondary covers have been replaced and rarely before mid-August. These feathers are not completely renewed until the beginning of October.

The molt of the tertiary remiges begins more or less at the same time as that of the secondary ones. The middle tertiary falls first, followed by the internal tertiary. Both feathers are often well developed again before the outer tertiary leaves the sheath.

=== Covert feathers and alula ===
The major primary blankets are changed along with their respective primary springs. Unlike the major primary coats, the major secondary coats molt earlier than the secondary spruces. The molting of these feathers is rapid, with several of them at the same stage of development simultaneously. The progression of the molt in these feathers is from the outside to the inside, as in the secondary remiges. Most birds has completed the change of the secondary coverts to August 15, more or less at the time is appreciable only secondary sheath remige I.

The molting of the lesser coverts begins early, often being the first feathers to fall. The onset of molting in male juveniles is particularly noticeable because it involves the replacement of the minor covers and results in the appearance of the reddish or orange wing spot. The new wing spot contrasts sharply with the yellowish-brown juvenile plumage in this area of the wing. The move of the minor blankets has generally been completed by September 1.

Alula feathers complete their development at about the same time as the last three primary sprouts. The marginal covers on the upper or outer surface of the forearm, located below the alula, shed at approximately the same time that the primary remix VI is being replaced.

The first feathers under the wing to molt are the marginal coverts, under the forearm. The shedding of these feathers begins at about the same time that the primary remix IV falls and is followed by that of the lower middle primary and lower middle secondary coats. The progression of the molting of the lower middle secondary blankets is from the outside to the inside, while that of the lower middle primary mats seems to be irregular or almost simultaneous. The medial lower coverts molt before the primary remiges VIII and IX. The major lower primary coverts and major lower secondary coverts molt last. The progression of the molting of these last feathers is the same as in the primary and secondary sprouts, that is, from the inside out and from the outside in, respectively.

=== Flow and capital pens ===
The caudal feathers comprise the rudder or rectrix feathers and the upper and lower tail coverts. The tail coverts begin to shed before the rectrices. Generally, the upper tail covers begin to shed first. Certain birds lose some rectrices by the end of the third week of August. The helmsmen in the center of the queue are the last rectrices to be renovated.

Molting in the capital region involves changing the feathers of the pileus and the sides of the head. It is one of the last parts of the body to begin feather replacement, but the renewal of most of the capital feathers is complete before that of the secondary feathers, tail feathers, and under-wing feathers. The beginning of the molt in this region coincides with the beginning of the development of the primary remige V or VI. Some individuals have already started replacing the capital feathers by mid-August. The molt begins at the pileus and the last areas of the capital region to complete it are the eye strip and the cheeks (malar region).

=== Other pens ===
In some birds, the first signs of molt in the ventral feathers appear during the last days of July, when the feathers of the anterior portion of the laterals begin to fall. From there, the molt progresses backward along the sides and forward toward the throat and chin. The last ventral feathers to be replaced are those towards the center of the abdomen. The molt of the dorsal feathers begins around the first week of August. It begins at the bladder, progresses to the upper back, and then to the cervical region.

The earliest evidence of molting in the humeral plumes corresponds to the last days of July. The molt comes from the anterior region backwards. The change of the femoral feathers begins later than that of the humeral ones. However, the progression is similar. Replacement of feather feathers rarely begins before August 15. The progression is generally from the proximal end of the tibia to the tarsometatarsal region.

== Distribution and habitat ==
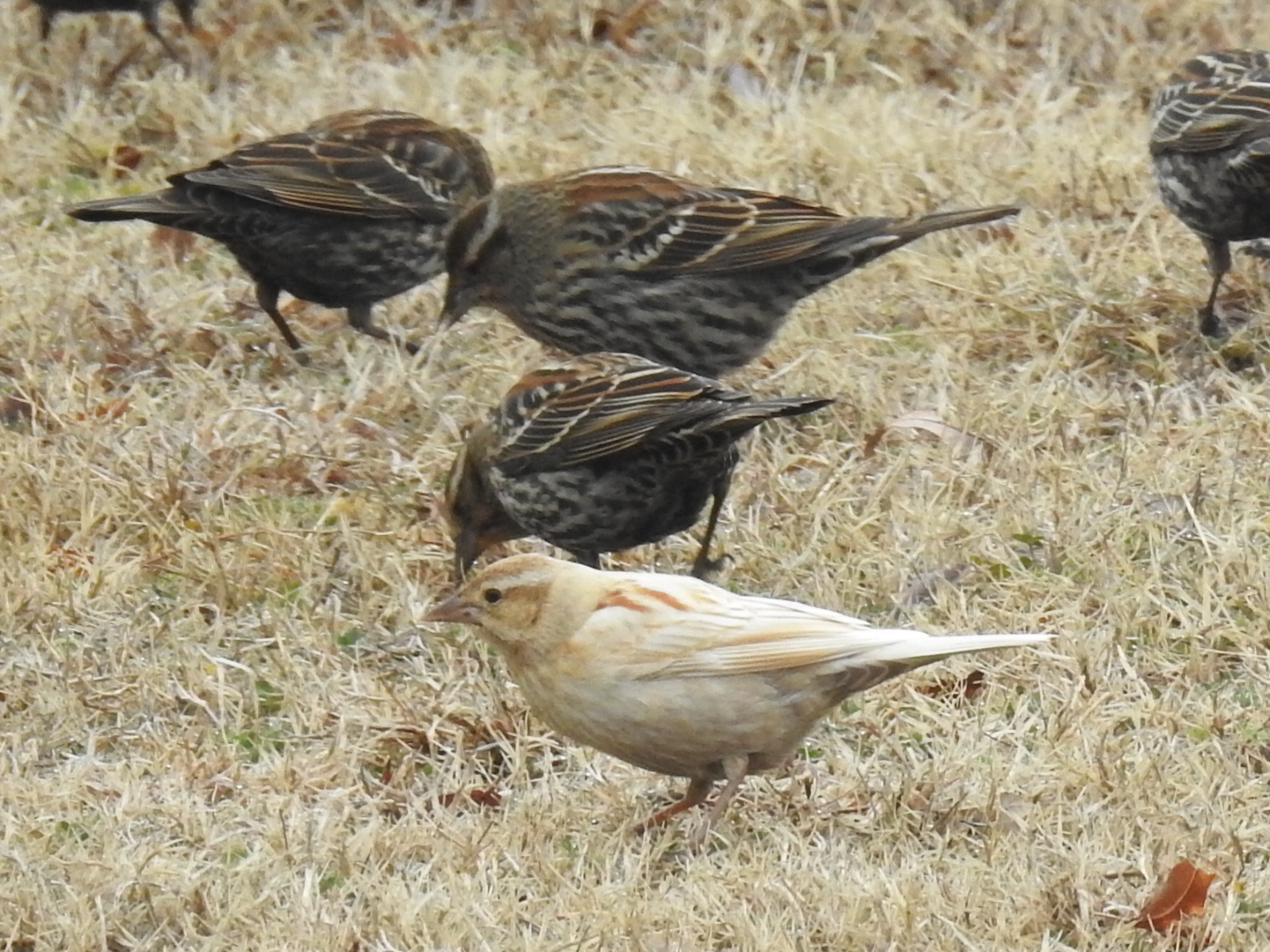
Leucistic female, in Texas

The red-winged blackbird is widely spread throughout North America, except in the arid desert, high mountain ranges, and arctic or dense afforestation regions. It breeds from central-eastern Alaska and Yukon in the northwest, and Newfoundland in the northeast, to northern Costa Rica in the south, and from the Atlantic to the Pacific. Northern populations migrate to the southern United States, but those that breed there, in Mexico, and in Central America are sedentary. Red-winged blackbirds in the northern reaches of the range are migratory, spending winters in the southern United States and Central America. Migration begins in September or October, but occasionally as early as August. In western and Central America, populations are generally non-migratory.

The red-winged blackbird inhabits open grassy areas. It generally prefers wetlands and inhabits both freshwater and saltwater marshes, particularly if cattail is present. It is also found in dry upland areas, where it inhabits meadows, prairies, and old fields. In a large part of its distribution area, it constitutes the most abundant passerine bird in the swamps in which it nests. It is also present in areas without much water, where it inhabits open fields – often agricultural areas – and sparse deciduous forests.

In the winter of 1975–1976, near Milan in western Tennessee, red-winged blackbirds were observed resting in a mixed roost that came to house 11 million individuals in January and early February in a plantation of 4.5 hectares of yellow pine (Pinus taeda) with little undergrowth. They were seen in soybean fields during the day, being that these constituted only 21% of the habitat in the area and that the other bird species present in the roost were not commonly observed in these fields; they were also common in cornfields. The presences of the bird in feedlots increased as winter progressed, but, accounting for less than 5% of the icterids and starlings recorded in both feedlots of cows and pigs, they were much rarer there than the brown-headed cowbird, common grackle and common starling.

=== Preferences by habitat types during the breeding season ===
During the breeding season, the density of breeding adults is much higher in swamps than in highland fields. Although the highest concentrations of nesting red-winged blackbird are found in swamps, most of them nest in upland habitats since they are much more abundant. In a study conducted in the Wood County, Ohio between 1964 and 1968, the density of territorial males in wetland habitat was found to be 2.89 times those in upland habitat. But, because of the small amount of wetland habitat, the total estimated upland population of territorial males was 2.14 times the wetland population. Alfalfa (Medicago sativa) and other legume crops (hay) were the principal habitat for breeding redwings in the county. Despite the marked preference for wetland habitats, the greater population in uplands reflects wetlands' scarcity.

=== Vegetation type preferences during the breeding season ===
In that same study, reproductive individuals in upland habitats demonstrated a slight preference for old and new grasses such as Phleum pratense, Dactylis glomerata, Poa spp., Festuca spp., and Bromus spp. in the early part of the breeding season and new non-graminoid herbaceous plants in the mid and late season. In wetlands, they consistently preferred old and new broadleaf monocotyledons, primarily Carex spp., broadleaf, and Typha spp., and consistently rejected old and new narrow-leaved monocots, primarily narrow-leaved Phalaris arundinacea and Calamagrostis canadensis, and non-graminoid herbaceous plants. Red-winged blackbirds breeding in the highlands favored older tall vegetation only in the early part of the breeding season on April to May, and higher new vegetation and dense vegetation throughout the breeding season. For their part, those who settled in wetlands seemed to have a slight predilection for taller old vegetation. During the breeding season, this species is attracted to tall vegetation that restricts visibility.

Early season preferences for old grassland in the highlands and old broadleaf monocotyledons in wetlands point to the importance of upright residual vegetation. Highland grasses and broadleaf monocots in wetlands stand partially vertically and are easily visible in early spring, unlike clovers, narrow-leaved monocotyledons in wetlands and most non-graminoid herbaceous plants. Old alfalfa plants are also partially upright in early spring, but they are not as consistently chosen a species as old grasses. The start of the territorial activity is earlier when the amount of residual vegetation is large. Vegetation structural strength also appears to be important for nesting as females tend to broadleaf monocotyledons in wetlands throughout the breeding season and new non-graminoid herbaceous plants in the mid to late season.

In southwestern Michigan, the density of cattail stems in different ponds was positively related to the concentration of reproductive adults. However, other studies detected a predilection for more scattered vegetation. One found that red-winged blackbirds avoided the marsh wren (Pantaneros chivirenes), a predator common in nests of this species, reproducing among more dispersed vegetation, which was more easily defended from the chivirines; conversely, the chivirines seemed to prefer the denser vegetation, where they were more likely to avoid the aggressiveness of the red-winged blackbird. These differences in habitat selection between one species and another resulted in spatial segregation of their breeding areas. On the other hand, red-winged blackbirds tend to opt for small lots of vegetation and plants with thick stems.

== Behavior ==
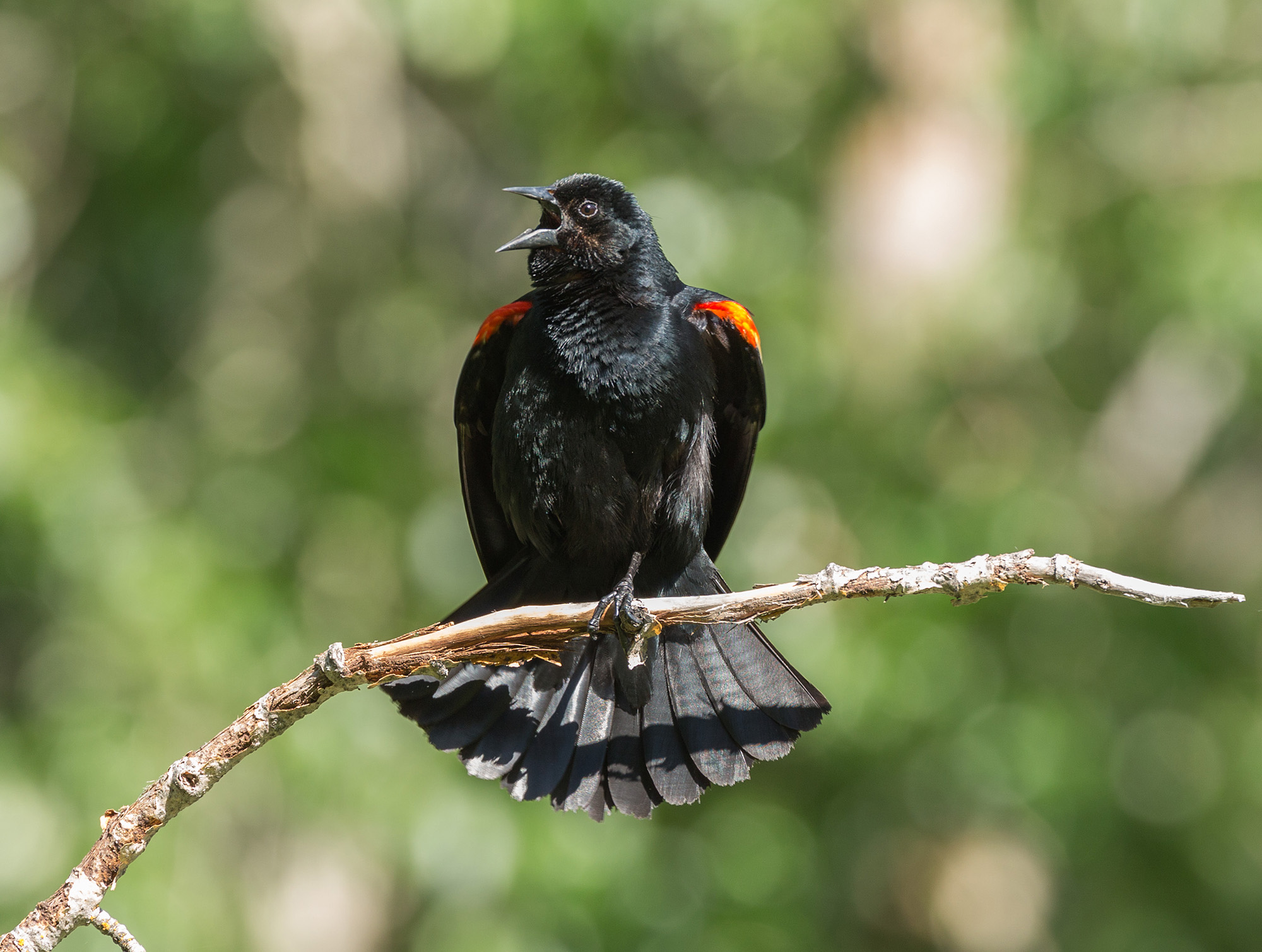
The "perched display", with wings held away from the body, is an agonistic behavior of the red-winged blackbird.

The red-winged blackbird is territorial, polygynous, gregarious and a short-distance migratory bird. Its way of flying is characteristic, with rapid wing flaps punctuated by brief periods of gliding flight. The behavior of males makes their presence easily perceived: they perch in high places such as trees, bushes, fences, and telephone lines. Females tend to stay low, prowling through the vegetation and building their nests. They can be found in home gardens, particularly during their migration, if seeds have been scattered on the ground. The forest curtains serve as a resting place during the day.

For several weeks after their first appearance in early spring, red-winged blackbirds are generally seen in flocks made up entirely of males. During those days, they are seldom seen at their breeding sites, except early morning and late afternoon. In most of the remaining hours of the day, they frequent open and often elevated agricultural land, where they feed mainly on grain stubble and grassy fields. When disturbed while eating, they fly to the nearest deciduous trees and immediately after landing they begin to sing.

=== Diet ===
The red-winged blackbird is omnivorous. It feeds primarily on plant materials, including seeds from weeds and waste grain such as corn and rice, but about a quarter of its diet consists of insects and other small animals, and considerably more so during breeding season. It prefers insects, such as dragonflies, damselflies, butterflies, moths, and flies, but also consumes snails, frogs, eggs, carrion, worms, spiders and mollusks. The red-winged blackbird forages for insects by picking them from plants, or by catching them in flight. Sometimes insects are obtained by exploring the bases of aquatic plants with their small beaks, opening holes to reach the insects hidden inside.

Aquatic insects, particularly emerging odonates, are of great importance in the diet of red-winged blackbirds that breed in swamps. These birds typically capture the odonates when the larvae climb up the stem of a plant from the water, get rid of their exuviae, and cling to the vegetation while their exoskeletons harden. The years of emergence of periodical cicadas provide an overabundant amount of food. According to Edward Howe Forbush, when red-winged blackbirds arrive north in the spring, they feed in the fields and meadows. Then, they follow the plows, collecting larvae, earthworms and caterpillars left exposed, and in case there is a plague of Paleacrita vernata caterpillars in a fruit orchard, these birds will fly a kilometer to get them for their chicks.

In season, red-winged blackbirds eat blueberries, blackberries, and other fruits. These birds can be lured to backyard bird feeders by bread and seed mixtures and suet. In late summer and in autumn, the red-winged blackbird will feed in open fields, mixed with grackles, cowbirds, and starlings in flocks which can number in the thousands. It feeds on corn while it is maturing; once the grain has hardened it is relatively safe from this bird, since its beak and digestive system are not adapted for the consumption of hard and whole corn grains, unlike the Common grackle, which has a longer and stronger beak. Studies of the stomachs of individuals of both sexes reveal that males consume higher proportions of crop grains, while females ingest a relatively larger amount of herb seeds and animal matter. In the winter of 1975–1976, near Milan, western Tennessee, corn and herb seeds were the main foods consumed by red-winged blackbird. Herbs whose seeds were commonly consumed were Sorghum halepense, Xanthium strumarium, Digitaria ischaemum, Sporobolus spp., Polygonum spp. and Amaranthus spp.

=== Breeding ===
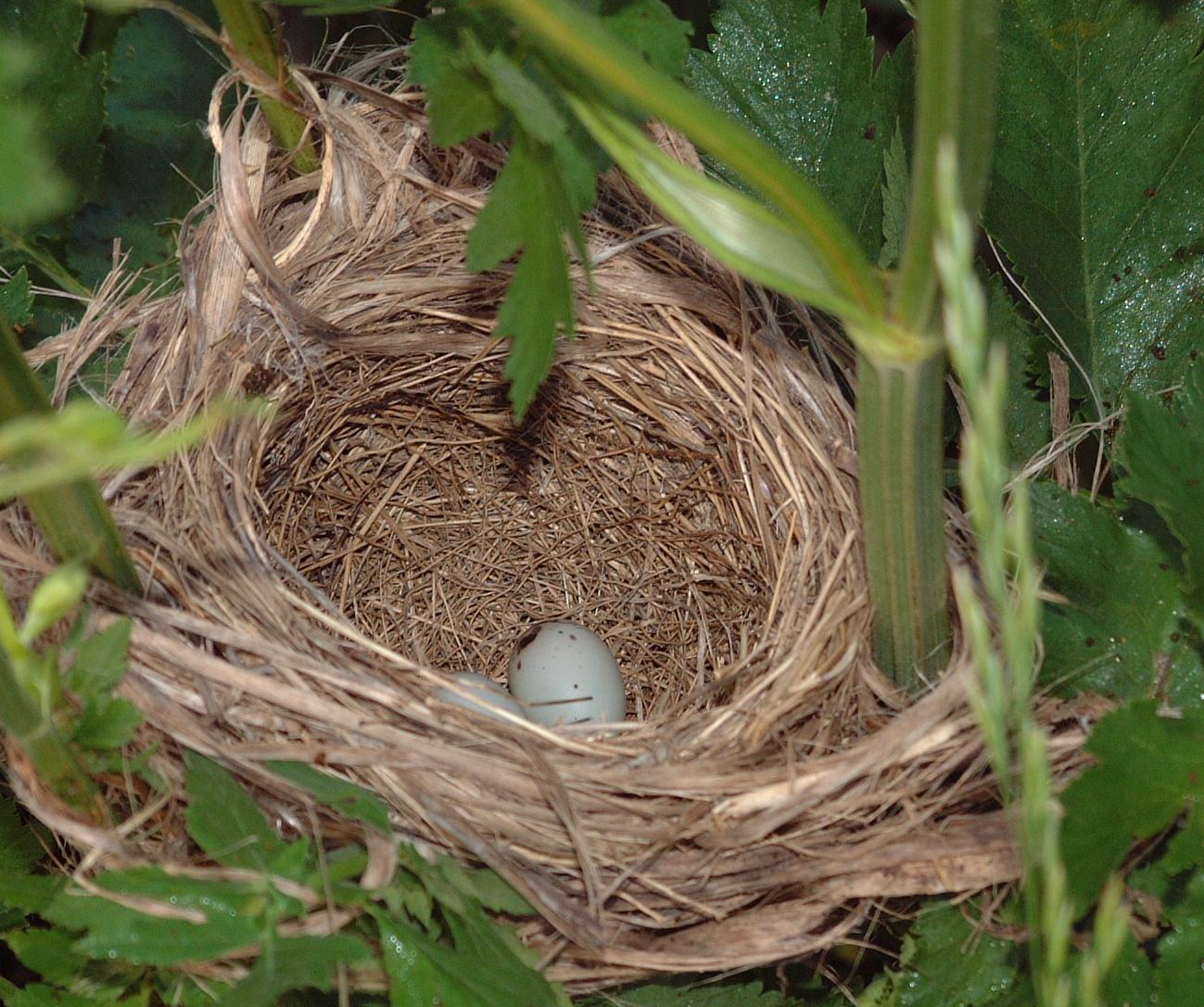
Nest with eggs

The red-winged blackbird nests in loose colonies. The nest is built in cattails, rushes, grasses, sedge, or alder or willow bushes. The nest is constructed entirely by the female over the course of three to six days. It is a basket of grasses, sedge, and mosses, lined with mud, and bound to surrounding grasses or branches. It is located 7.6 cm (3.0 in) to 4.3 m (14 ft) above water.

A clutch consists of three or four, rarely five, eggs. Eggs are oval, smooth and slightly glossy, and measure 24.8 mm × 17.55 mm (0.976 in × 0.691 in). They are pale bluish green, marked with brown, purple, and/or black, with most markings around the larger end of the egg. These are incubated by the female alone, and hatch in 11 to 12 days. Red-winged blackbirds are hatched blind and naked, but are ready to leave the nest 11 to 14 days after hatching.

Red-winged blackbirds are polygynous, with territorial males defending up to 10 females. However, females frequently copulate with males other than their social mate and often lay clutches of mixed paternity. Pairs raise two or three clutches per season, in a new nest for each clutch.

The reproductive season of the red-winged blackbird extends approximately from the end of April to the end of July. On the other hand, in different states has been estimated that the period in which the active nests contained eggs lay between beginning in late April and early late August; and in northern Louisiana nests were found to harbor chicks from late April to late July. The peak of the nesting season (the time with the highest number of active nests) has been recorded between the first half of May and the beginning of June in different places. A study in eastern Ontario found that although red-winged blackbirds began nesting earlier in years with warm springs, associated with low winter values in the North Atlantic Oscillation Index, egg laying dates remained unchanged. Male testosterone levels peak in the early part of the breeding season, but remain high throughout the season. Females reproduce for up to ten years.

Many aspects of territorialism (for example, the number of male songs and displays, and the number of intrusions into foreign territories) peak before mating. After this, the frequency of many of the territorial behaviors decreases and the males are mainly concerned with defending the females, eggs, and chicks against predation. Experiments in the systematic removal of birds from their territories suggest that the extra population of males that is present in swamps before copulations disappears after copulation.

Predation of eggs and nestlings is quite common. Nest predators include snakes, mink, raccoons, and other birds, even as small as marsh wrens. The red-winged blackbird is occasionally a victim of brood parasites, particularly brown-headed cowbirds. Since nest predation is common, several adaptations have evolved in this species. Group nesting is one such trait which reduces the risk of individual predation by increasing the number of alert parents. Nesting over water reduces the likelihood of predation, as do alarm calls. Nests, in particular, offer a strategic advantage over predators in that they are often well concealed in thick, waterside reeds and positioned at a height of one to two meters. Males often act as sentinels, employing a variety of calls to denote the kind and severity of danger. Mobbing, especially by males, is also used to scare off unwanted predators, although mobbing often targets large animals and man-made devices by mistake. The brownish coloration of the female may also serve as an anti-predator trait in that it may provide camouflage for her and her nest while she is incubating.

=== Predators and parasites ===
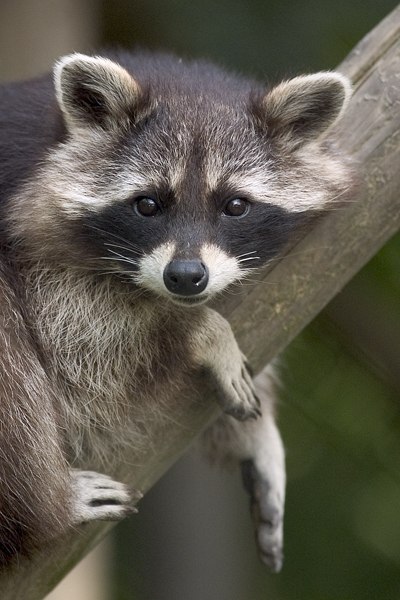
The raccoon is one of the known predators of the red-winged blackbird.

Predators of red-winged blackbirds include such species as raccoons, American mink, long-tailed weasels, black-billed magpies, common grackles, owls, red-tailed hawks, short-tailed hawks, and snakes (such as the northern water snake and the plains garter snake). Ravens and grazers such as marsh wrens feed on eggs (and even small chicks), if the nest is left unattended, destroying the eggs, occasionally drinking from them, and pecking the nestlings to death.

The relative importance of different nest predators varies by geographic region: the top predators in different regions include the marsh wren in British Columbia, the magpies in Washington, and the raccoons in Ontario. The incidence of avian predation in red-winged blackbird nests is higher in western populations than in eastern populations.

Due to high predation rates, especially of eggs and chicks, the red-winged blackbird has developed various adaptations to protect its nests. One of them consists of nesting in groups, which reduces the danger since there is a greater number of alert parents. Nesting over water also lowers the chances of an attack. Nests in particular offer a strategic advantage as they are often hidden among dense riparian reeds, at a height of one or two meters. males often act as sentinels, using a repertoire of calls. Males in particular hunt down potential predators to scare them away, even when dealing with much larger animals. Aggressiveness of the red-winged blackbird towards the marsh wren, which also nests in swamps, causes a partial interspecies territorialism. On the other hand, nocturnal predators such as raccoons and American mink are not attacked by adults. Coloration of the female could serve to camouflage it, protecting it and its nest when it is incubated.

The red-winged blackbird can accommodate ectoparasites such as various Phthiraptera, the Ischnocera Philopterus agelaii and Brueelia ornatissima, and hematophagous mites, like Ornithonyssus sylviarum, and endoparasites like Haemoproteus quiscalus, Leucocytozoon icteris, Plasmodium vaughani, nematodes, flukes and tapeworms.

=== Territorial ===
Agitated male

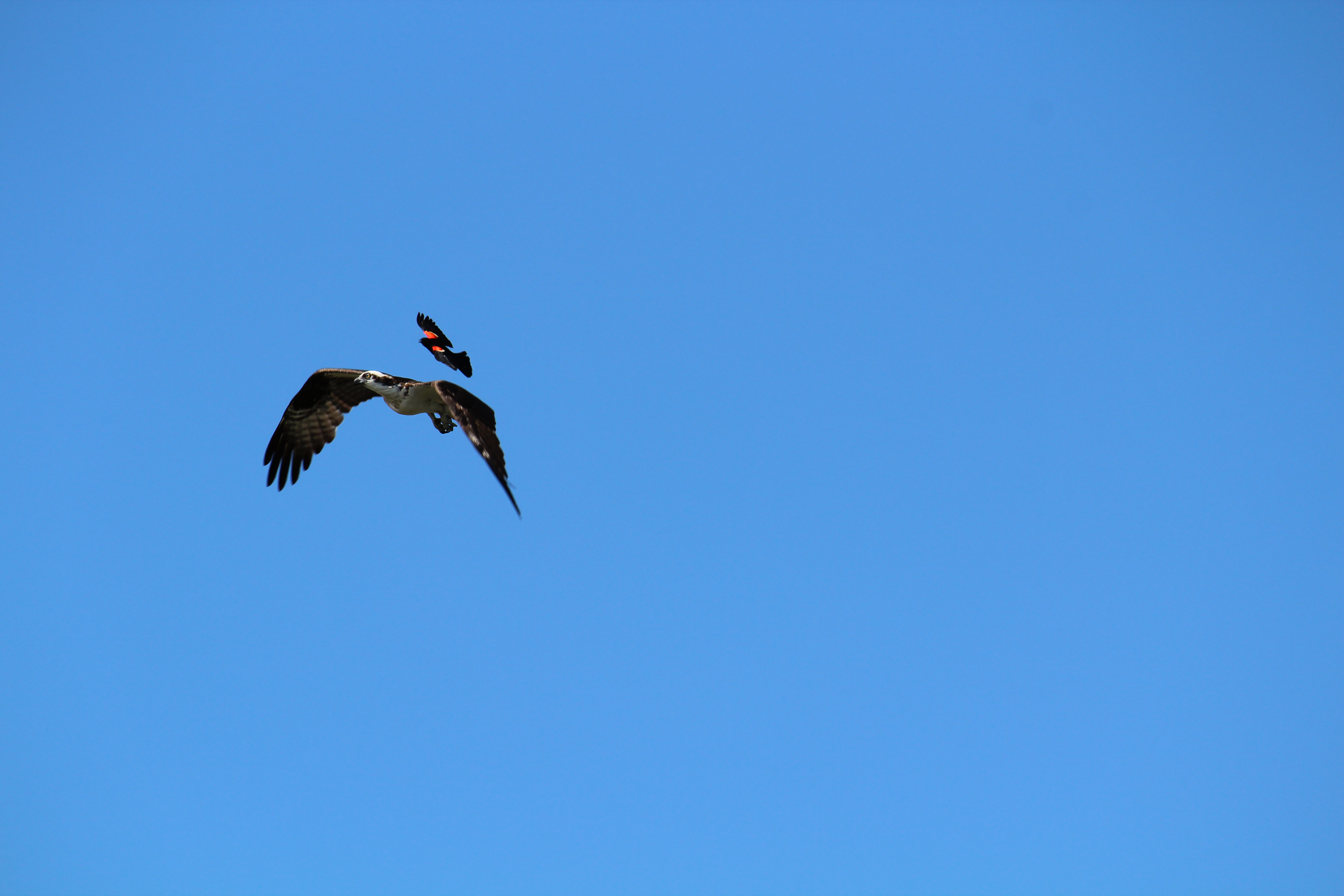
Male red-winged blackbird mobbing an osprey

The red-winged blackbird aggressively defends its territory from other animals, and will attack much larger birds. During breeding season, males will swoop at humans who encroach upon their nesting territory. Male red-winged blackbirds also exhibit important territorial behaviors, most of which provides them with the necessary fidelity for many years to come. A few important factors for male red-winged blackbirds' adherence to territories include food, hiding spaces from predators, types of neighbors, and reactions towards predators. Additionally, a study was done on site fidelity and movement patterns by Les D. Beletsky and Gordon H. Orians in 1987 which explained much of the males' territorial behaviors once migrated and settled onto a territory of their own.

Sufficient evidence had shown that males are committed to staying in their territory over a long period of time and are not more likely to change territories at a younger age due to limited experience of knowledge for success. Studies also showed that most of the males that were first-time movers to a new territory were between two and three years old. The majority of males that moved were young and inexperienced. Later on they had moved towards more available territories. If males had chosen to leave their territory for reproductive success, as an example, they would do so within a short distance. Males who moved shorter distances were more successful in reproducing than those who moved longer distances. Further studies showed that when males moved further away from their territories there was a decrease in probability of successfully fledging.

The maximum longevity of the red-winged blackbird in the wild is 15.8 years.

=== Migration ===
Red-winged blackbirds that breed in the northern part of their range (i.e., Canada and border states in the United States) migrate south for the winter. However, populations near the Pacific and Gulf coasts of North America and those of Middle America are year-round resident. Red-winged blackbirds live in both the northern US and Canada, ranging from Yucatan Peninsula in the south to southern Alaska. These extensions account for the majority of the continent stretching from California's Pacific coast and Canada to the eastern seaboard. Much of the populations within Middle America are non-migratory. During the fall, populations begin migrating towards the southern US. Movement of red-winged blackbirds can begin as early as August through October. Spring migration begins anywhere between mid-February to mid-May. Numerous birds from northern parts of the US, particularly the Great lakes, migrate nearly 1,200 km (750 mi) between their breeding season and winter Winter territorial areas differ based on geographic location.

Other populations that migrate year-round include those located in Middle America or in the western US and Gulf Coast. Females typically migrate longer distances than males. These female populations located near the Great Lakes migrate nearly 230 km (140 mi) farther. Yearly traveled females also migrate further than adult males, while also moving roughly the same distance as other adult females. Red-winged blackbirds migrate primarily during daytime. In general, males' migration flocks arrive prior to females in the spring and after females in the fall.

== Ecological and economic impact ==
According to the American ornithologist Arthur Cleveland Bent, in the northern regions of its range the eastern red-winged blackbird is almost completely beneficial from an economic perspective and there are comparatively few complaints of severe crop damage. Their diet consists almost entirely of insects, very few of which are useful species, and herb seeds. However, it causes certain damages to the grains that germinate in spring and to sweet corn in summer, while the grains are still soft, tearing the foliaceous covering of the ears and ruining them from a commercial point of view. It also attacks other grains in a limited way, but most of what it consumes is waste left in the ground.

In the Midwest, where these birds are much more abundant and where cereals are grown more extensively than in the North, red-winged blackbirds and other ichterids, in late summer and fall, do great damage to grain fields, both while they are maturing as when they are harvested. However, it has been claimed that even there are beneficial because the larvae removed from corncobs and beet plants can counteract pests of caterpillars. In the southern states, they seriously harm rice by plucking seedlings in spring and eating the still-soft grains as they mature, being in this sense almost as harmful as the Bobolink. On the other hand, they are of some use in consuming weed seeds that would otherwise devalue the product.

Being one of the most numerous birds on the continent, it plays an important role in the dispersal of other species. Since red-winged blackbirds gather and rest in such large numbers, the survival of certain species that join their flocks is likely to be affected by their company. They can also be an important source of food for animals such as raccoons and mink. Likewise, populations that nest and rest in swamps could cushion the effect of predation on duck species and other animals. In summary, these birds are so numerous and active that their mere presence and natural behavior is enough to influence the environment in a visible way.

=== Positives: weed control and harmful insects ===
Through the control of insect populations through predation and unwanted herbs with the consumption of their seeds, they allow the growth of larger plants and crops. They also eat on Anthonomus grandis and Hypera postica, two species of weevils affecting cotton and alfalfa respectively, as well as harmful caterpillars of the European gypsy moth (Lymantria dispar) and of the genus Malacosoma. In some areas of the southern United States, the seeds of the common plumber (Xanthium strumarium), a weed detrimental to soybeans and cotton, seems to be an important food source for the species.

Beal (1900) stated: In summarizing the economic status of the red-winged blackbird, the main aspect to consider is the small percentage that grains represent in their annual diet, which apparently contradicts complaints about its destructive habits. Judging by stomach contents, the red-winged blackbird is decidedly a useful bird. The service it provides through the elimination of harmful insects and herb seeds far outweighs the damage caused by its consumption of grains. The havoc it sometimes causes must be entirely attributed to its excessive abundance in certain places.

During the breeding season, the approximately 8 million red-winged blackbirds nesting in Ohio and their chicks probably consume more than 5.4 million kilograms (12,000,000 lb) of insects, an average of almost 53 kg/km^{2} (300 lb/sq mi). Many of these insects, such as the weevils (Hypera spp.), Come from alfalfa fields, pastures, oat fields and other crops. In cornfields, blackbirds often feed on corn worms (Helicoverpa zea) and beetles of the genus Diabrotica. In early spring, red-winged blackbirds consume corn borers (Ostrinia nubilalis) in fields with corn stubble. However, Bendell et al. (1981) found that the economic benefit of pest control, such as larvae of that lepidopteran, by the red-winged blackbird only compensated for 20% of the damage to crops caused by this bird.

=== Negative aspects: consumption of cultivated grains ===
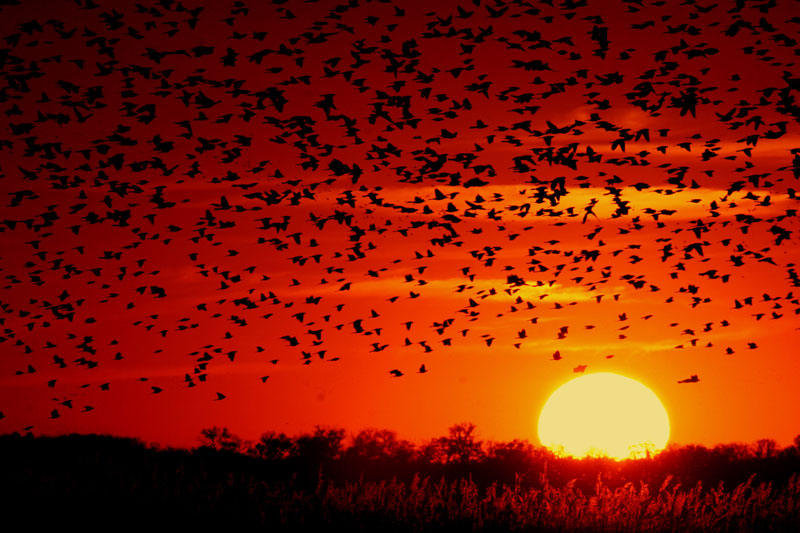
Flock flying in the twilight

Red-winged blackbirds can devastate farm fields. Despite consuming weed seeds, they are known to cause great damage to agriculture due to their habits of resting in massive groups. And their taste for agricultural products may also cause harm to corn, rice, sunflower, and sorghum. The red-winged blackbird is the largest species of Icterid in North America and the most damaging to crops. From 215 birds Neotropical migrants have been identified as causing, by a wide margin, the greatest economic loss. In North America, the damage to corn crops by this species has increased since the late 1960s to early 1980s, perhaps because of the increase in the area for grain production, and due to the reduction of small areas with stubble, hayfields and uncultivated land, which, in turn, accentuated the bird's dependence on corn to ensure its livelihood.

Apparently, the male does more damage to this grain than the female. In some areas of Ohio, corn can account for up to 75% of the diet of males and only 6% of that of females in August and September. In South Dakota, in the late summer, the gizzards of the males studied contained 29% corn, while in the case of the female that number was limited to 9%.

=== Situation in the Midwest ===
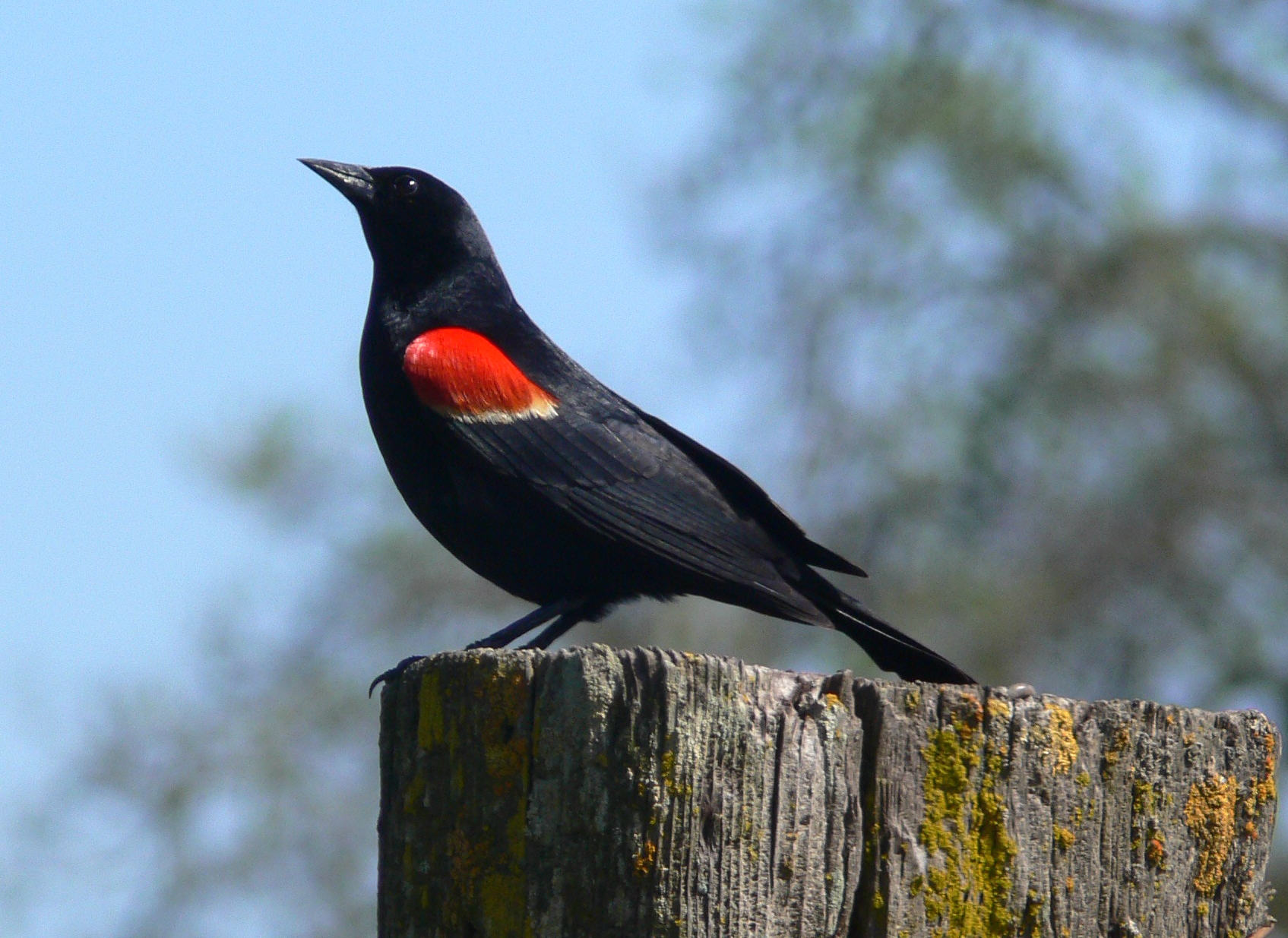
Male perched on a log

The red-winged blackbird is the dominant species in the large concentrations of blackbirds that feed on the fields of sunflower, corn and small grains maturing in late summer or early fall in the Dakotas. In the 1970s, losses to sunflower and corn crops caused by blackbirds in the Dakotas exceeded $3 million annually for each case. In the northern part of the Great Plains, an area known as the Prairie Pothole Region, red-winged blackbirds are very abundant in summer. They congregate in post-reproductive flocks that significantly harm crops, particularly sunflower plantations near their home sites. Most sunflower damage occurs between mid-August and early September, when the calorie content of immature seeds is low and birds must consume more of them to satiate themselves.

During this initial stage of predation on sunflower crops in which more than 75% of the total damage is caused, the red-winged blackbird represent 80% of the blackbirds observed in the fields of this seed. This period predates the massive migration of birds and most of them are of local origin. Most remain within 200 km (120 mi) of their native sites until the molting of their feathers is complete or nearly complete in late August or early September. Damage can be quite serious in the center and southeast of North Dakota and Northeast South Dakota, areas of high concentration of sunflower production and abundant wetlands that attract red-winged blackbird during the breeding season.

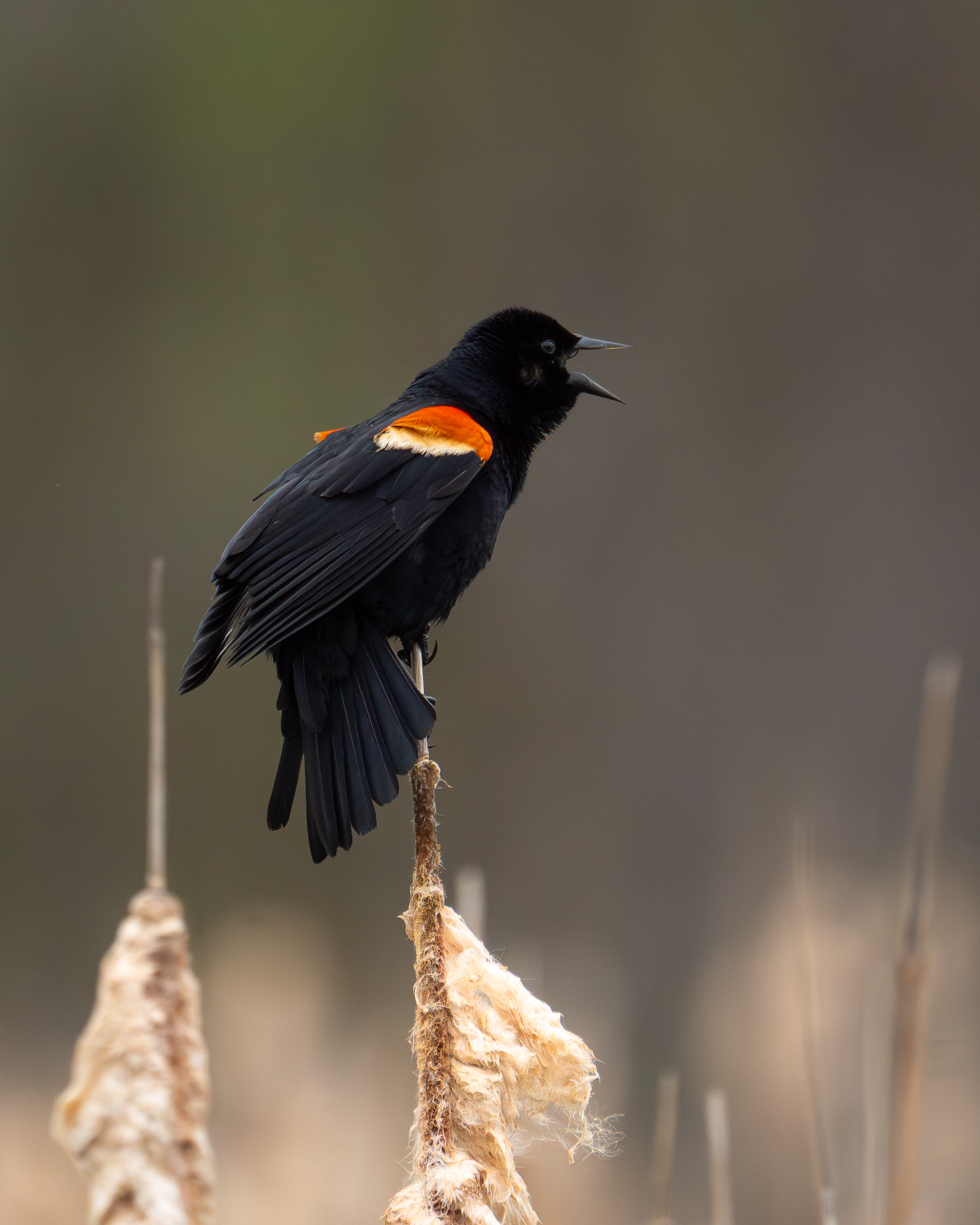
Male in Washtenaw County, Michigan

Investigations conducted between 1968 and 1979 revealed that blackbirds, notably the black-winged blackbird and the common grackle, annually destroyed less than 1% of corn crops in Ohio, amounting to a loss between 4 and 6 million dollars according to 1979 prices.

All Ohio counties experience some degree of predation on their maize crops from blackbirds, but those most affected are a few counties where marshes that roost them still abound. The counties of Ottawa, Sandusky and Lucas, on the waters of Sandusky Bay and Lake Erie, were the hardest hit. These three counties, among the 19 studied between 1968 and 1976, contained 62% of the fields in which the losses exceeded 5% and 77% of those in which they exceeded 10%. Other counties with extensive localized damage were Erie, Ashtabula also located on the coasts of the mentioned water courses and Hamilton. Almost all the plantations with damages greater than 5% were within 8 km (5.0 mi) of some important roosting of blackbirds. In the 1968–1976 period, in northeast Sandusky County and northwest Ottawa, where large roosts of up to a million birds were discovered in late summer and fall, average losses exceeded 9% in fields 3 to 5 km (1.9 to 3.1 mi) from the roosts, but they were less than 5% at 8 km (5.0 mi) and less than 2% at 16 km (9.9 mi). In southwestern Ontario, in the summer of 1964, it was found that the greatest damage to the cornfields by red-winged blackbird also occurred near roosts in swamps.

== Pest control ==
Brown-headed cowbirds and red-winged blackbirds in Cayuga Lake Basin, New York, US

The two main options that farmers can choose from to avoid the presence of birds once corn has entered the milky stage of its maturation process are the use of the chemical 4-aminopyridine and the implementation of mechanical devices to frighten birds away. The time chosen to take measures to disperse the blackbirds is of great importance since once the birds have chosen a field to feed there they are likely to return for several days. The longer they are allowed to feed unmolested, the more difficult it will become to scare them away. Also, most of the damage is inflicted in just a few days, when the pimples are soft; consequently, control techniques will not be very useful if applied after this period.

=== Pest control history ===
As early as 1667, Massachusetts Bay settlers had enacted laws to try to reduce blackbird populations and mitigate damage to corn. According to Henry David Thoreau, a law provided that each single man in a town must kill six of those birds and, as a punishment for not doing so, he could not marry until he had complied with the aforementioned design. Obviously, since blackbirds reproduce at a much higher speed than humans marry, this control strategy was a failure. Pioneers traveling west to the Great Lakes region faced similar problems. By 1749, blackbirds were so abundant around western Lake Erie that people took turns watching over the maturing grain crops.

At the beginning of the 20th century, in some places, when the reeds dried up, these circumstances were used to kill these birds in the following way. A crew approached a roost in silence, hidden in the darkness of the night, and simultaneously lit the reeds at various points, which were quickly enveloped by a single great flame. This caused a huge tumult among the red-winged blackbird, which, lit by fire, were shot down in large numbers as they hovered in midair and screamed all over the place. Sometimes straw was used for the same purpose, which was previously scattered near reeds and alder bushes (Alnus spp.) in which they gathered to rest, the burning of which caused great consternation among the birds. The gang returned the next day to collect the hunted prey.

Arthur Cleveland Bent says that, before it was banned the sale of prey hunting in the market, red-winged blackbirds were massacred in large numbers in autumn and sold in markets. When they had put on weight on a diet of grains or rice, their small bodies were served as delicious snacks on the gourmet tables. Few could distinguish them from bobolinks (Dolichonyx oryzivorus).

In 1926, when the US Biological Survey – predecessor of the United States Fish and Wildlife Service carried out its first compilation of roosts of undesirable ichterids, it was recorded in Ohio, with its large populations of these birds and the fifth largest area allocated to the cultivation of corn among the American states, a number of complaints higher than in any other state. During the 1950s, bird control committees were organized in some counties to deal with the damage to maize caused by blackbirds and the Ohio Agricultural Experiment Station now the Ohio Agricultural Research and Development Center and the Department of Zoology and Entomology of the state university began investigating the problem.

=== Use of deadly traps and chemicals ===
Crop predation has led to the use of traps, poison and surfactants by farmers in an attempt to control populations of red-winged blackbirds; these last properties suppress waterproof feathers, making them extremely vulnerable to the cold, but their effectiveness depends on certain atmospheric conditions, namely low temperatures and rainfall. Programs in which baits were used poisoned to reduce icteride concentrations in late summer have been unsuccessful. While thousands of birds have occasionally died, the effect on large roosting-associated flocks that sometimes contain more than a million individuals is small; In addition, specimens of other species frequently die. The use of large lure traps, which often catch hundreds of birds per day, is also ineffective against these large flocks.

=== Use of 4-aminopyridine ===
4-Aminopyridine is applied to one in one hundred particles of ground corn used as bait. Generally, corn is thrown into the fields from planes that release a load of about 3.4 kg (7.5 lb) of bait per hectare on one third of the land. Because that amount of ground corn contains around 205,000 particles, approximately 2050 toxic particles are distributed per hectare treated. The ingestion of one or more of these particles by a blackbird causes erratic flight, calls for suffering and finally death; that behavior often leads the remaining birds in the flock to leave the field. The chemical DRC-1327, which has proven useful in mitigating damage to maturing corn, operates in the same way: when a bird ingests kernels from a partially hand-peeled cob to which the chemical has been applied with a sprayer manual, his erratic flight and his pre-death calls for suffering, which span a space of between five and fifteen minutes, chase away flocks from the fields.

The initial application of 4-aminopyridine should be carried out as soon as possible after the start of the milky stage of the grain ripening process. Two other booster applications five to seven days apart are generally recommended; Often just one is sufficient, but under conditions of prolonged bird activity more than three applications may be required at shorter intervals. In Brown County (Northeast South Dakota), in 1965, hand-spread 4-aminopyridine baits at intervals of about one week reduced projected red-winged blackbird loss by maturing corn crops by 85%. The distressing behavior exhibited by the individuals affected by the chemical produced a marked fear response in other members of the flocks and the fields were free of red-winged blackbirds even when the estimated directly affected proportion was less than 1%. It has even been suggested that the continued use of 4-aminopyridine over the years could cause a change in the pattern of migration to the south, as if birds were learning to avoid areas persistently treated with the chemical.

In another experiment in the same county, the number of blackbirds making use of the treated area fell dramatically over a period of five days after treatment had begun and remained low for the remainder of the season of damage to cornfields. The results of this method were largely limited to icterides. Although common pheasant were abundant, there was no evidence that any were affected, and mortality among other bird species was negligible.

The abundance of weeds should be considered as restricting the chances that birds will find bait particles scattered on the ground, so the use of this chemical must be accompanied by a weed control program. A less obvious problem is that of the insects that remove the bait. If Gryllus are detected in a field, ground corn is expected to disappear quickly. Crickets generally select untreated particles and leave the toxic ones behind; however, the rapid decrease in the total volume of ground corn on the ground decreases the attractiveness of ground-level feeding for blackbirds. Because cricket populations are difficult to control, more frequent applications or other bird control techniques may be desirable under these circumstances. A third problem is that of heavy rains, which cover the bait with soil or drag it into cracks in the ground. Likewise, a low population density of ichterides can reduce the effectiveness of its control with 4-aminopyridine.

=== Non-lethal methods ===
A variety of devices to repel them, including electronic noise-making systems, helium balloons tied in the fields, radio-controlled aircraft, and various types of scarecrows are occasionally used in cornfields. Methods such as scarecrows, pyrotechnics, and propane cannons, may help mitigate mild predation, but only work effectively if the duration of the damage period is less than that of the birds becoming accustomed to these methods. Red-winged blackbirds quickly become accustomed to them, particularly if the crop is a prime food source in an area with few alternative sources of livelihood. Although harvesting as early as possible after the corn has dried sufficiently can limit damage by northern grazing flocks, adjusting the harvest date does not help farmers reduce losses by red-winged blackbirds during the milky stage.

One approach that has been successful in controlling roosts in the highlands is dispersal of populations through habitat alteration or bird harassment. These procedures, carried out by biologists in cooperation with local citizens, have been successful in dispersing or displacing populations of up to one million individuals. Although this dispersion can sometimes move the problem from one place to another – especially when the area has been intensively cultivated with corn and alternative food sources are not abundant, it has often been effective in solving local problem situations.

Because oats and wheat grains in already harvested fields constitute an important food for blackbirds in late summer, the postponement of plowing the land with small grain stubble can lessen the pressure exerted by the predation of these birds on the maturing corn. The natural existence or planting of plants such as millet, sorghum (Sorghum spp.), Polygons (Polygonum spp.) And various grasses for example, mohas (Setaria spp.) that could be beneficial. As a general ecological principle, diversity in the types of habitats that can be maintained in regions of intense agricultural activity is related to a greater probability that the damages caused by pests are restricted to economically tolerable levels.

Studies in sweet corn fields indicate that blackbirds could often be initially attracted to maturing crops by insects. Flocks can wander the land cultivated for about a week consuming insects and weed seeds before attacking the corn. Diabrotica beetles may be especially attractive during this period. Thus the birds become habituated to feeding in the fields and quickly move from insects to corn when it enters the vulnerable milky stage. Experiments in which insect populations in sweet corn crops were treated with insecticides during the week before the grain entered the milky phase, they showed that fewer birds visited these fields and less damage was recorded to the corn in the subsequent vulnerability period than in nearby untreated land. It is probable that the abundance of weeds in cornfields also increases their attractiveness to ichterids and their control would lead to a decrease in the losses produced by these birds.

=== Chemical sterilization ===
An alternative way to reduce populations of red-winged blackbird, and therefore the damage they cause to crops, involves implementing a program that is intended to interfere with their ability to reproduce, for example, through the use of sterilizing chemicals. Due to the polygynous nature of the species, it has been suggested that such a program could become more effective if directed at males. However, the incidence of promiscuity would imply that chemical sterilization of a certain fraction of males from a local population would not result in a proportional decrease in fertile clutches.

The effects of this method would probably vary according to the type of habitat in which the treated males have established their territories. In general, there should be a higher proportion of fertile clutches in those densely populated habitats and with a greater number of renidifications (nest reconstructions). Renidifications are more common in swamps than in the highlands. In turn, individuals that reproduce in the highlands probably feed more often within their own territories than those that reproduce in swamps, which probably makes promiscuity difficult in the first type of habitat. Thus, chemical sterilization could be more effective among upland populations than among swamp populations.

Sterilizing chemicals may reduce the number of chicks produced by a successful nest. Since renidification clutches are significantly fewer in number than the original, even if a female that first mated with a sterile male then renidified and mated with a fertile male, perhaps she would produce fewer chicks than she would have had if her first clutch would have been fertile.

The number of fertile clutches in a male's territory may be limited through the sterilization of that male, but the degree to which that number decreases will depend on the disposition of the neighboring fertile territorial males and perhaps also on the number of fertile non-territorial males. in the population. Studies with artificial eggs suggest that incubation of sterile eggs would be prolonged, 98 since females normally incubate artificial eggs for around 20 days. An extended incubation of unviable eggs would result in fewer renidification attempts and, therefore, it decreased the opportunities to find a fertile mate for a female who originally mated with a sterile male.

== Relationship with humans ==
Farmers have been known to use pesticides – such as parathion – in attempts to control red-winged blackbird populations. In the United States, such efforts are illegal because no pesticide can be used on non-target organisms, or for any use not explicitly listed on the pesticide's label. However, the USDA has deliberately poisoned this species in the past: in 2009, the Animal and Plant Health Inspection Service reported poisoning over 950,000 red-winged blackbirds in Texas and Louisiana. This poisoning has been implicated as a potential cause of the decline of the rusty blackbird, a once abundant species that has declined 99% since the 1960s and has been recently listed as Threatened on the IUCN Red List.

In the Anishinaabe languages, an indigenous language group spoken throughout much of the bird's northeastern range, this bird's names are diverse. In the Oji-Cree language, the northernmost of the Anishinaabe languages, it is called jachakanoob, while the Ojibwe language spoken in Northwestern Ontario and into Manitoba ranging immediately south of the Oji-Cree's range, the bird is called jachakanoo (with the cognates cahcahkaniw (Swampy Cree), cahcahkaluw (coastal Southern East Cree), cahcahkayuw (inland Southern East Cree), cahcahkayow (Plains Cree); the northern Algonquian languages classify the red-winged blackbird as a type of a junco or grackle, deriving the bird's name from their word for "spotted" or "marked".

In the vast majority of the other Ojibwa language dialects, the bird is called memiskondinimaanganeshiinh, literally meaning "a bird with a very red damn-little shoulder-blade". However, in the Odawa language, an Anishinaabe language in southwestern Ontario and in Michigan, the bird is instead called either memeskoniinisi ("bird with a red [patch on its wing]") or memiskonigwiigaans ("[bird with a] wing of small and very red [patch]"). In Nsyilxcən the bird is known as ƛ̓kƛ̓aʕkək. In the Hoocąk language they are known as cooxją́ aporošucra, which describes the round red spot on its wing as well as identifying it as a blackbird.

In the Lakota language, another Indigenous language spoken throughout much of the bird's range, the bird is called wabloša ("wings of red"). Its songs are described in Lakota as tōke, mat'ā nī ("oh! that I might die"), nakun miyē ("...and me"), miš eyā ("me too!"), and cap'cehlī ("a beaver's running sore").

== Conservation status ==
It is a species of least-concern. Being one of the most populous and most widely distributed birds in North America, little has been done to protect it from the effects of habitat destruction and urbanization. It can survive in a wide range of environments, and many populations manage to overcome the loss of natural habitats. However, red-winged blackbirds thrive in wetland areas, and with the destruction of natural wetlands their population is likely to shrink. The species is protected under the Migratory Bird Treaty Act 1918, a formal treaty between the United States and Canada that was later expanded to include Mexico. This law gives them legal protection in the United States, but they can be killed "when they are found preying or about to prey on ornamental trees or trees planted for shade, crops, livestock or wildlife."

A study in Illinois indicated that red-winged blackbird populations doubled between 1908 and 1958. It had traditionally reproduced in wetlands, with Ohio primarily inhabiting swamps associated with lakes and rivers. During the 20th century, however, it adapted to man-made habitat changes and now often nests in hayfields, along roads and ditches, and elsewhere in the highlands.

Despite its successful adaptation to changes in practices related to land use, populations of red-winged blackbird have reduced the width of its range during the second half of the twentieth century, and changes in the abundance and adequacy of grasslands have been implicated in this. In Ohio, the red-winged blackbird was negatively affected between 1966 and 1996 by the decrease in hay production, the earlier harvest of hay and the increase in crops planted in furrows, a situation homologous to that suffered by other species of birds from less numerous grasslands. Although the negative effect of the increased efficiency and the diminishing diversity of modern agricultural practices on the populations of red-winged blackbird in this state may be perceived as a positive event by the producers of corn and sunflower, the agricultural practices that have precipitated the numerical decline of this species may have caused more severe repercussions for birds from less common grasslands, such as the upland sandpiper and the grasshopper sparrow.

In the late 1970s, Ohio hosted the highest density of blackbirds during the breeding season among all US states and Canadian provinces. However, between 1966 and 1996, the reproductive populations in this state showed a marked decrease. Decreasing the area under hay other than alfalfa between those same years was likely to reduce the availability of quality nesting habitats. Likewise, corn and soybeans do not provide adequate nesting habitat—despite the fact that corn attracts insects that red-winged blackbirds consume and is itself an energy source and that the two crops made up an average of 70% of the cultivated area in Ohio from 1966 to 1996. In turn, the large annual fluctuations in the area cultivated with hay, both from one year to the next and within the same year of a certain reproductive season. Similarly, in Ontario between 1974 and 1995, the average size of harems in a given year was positively related to hay production from the previous year, although the percentage variation in the size of harems from one season to the next the following was not linearly related to the annual percentage change in hay production; Hay production declined during this period and the size of the harems decreased from approximately three females per male to 1.6 females.

In addition in Ontario, a negative relationship was found between the North Atlantic Oscillation Index (NAO) in the six months prior to a certain reproductive season and the size of the harems. If winter mortality contributes to the decrease in the size of the harems, the annual variations in their size should be related to the annual changes in the rates of return of marked territorial males. Variations in the size of harems and male return rates per year were indeed found to be positively correlated. Although not as pronounced, the relationship between male return rates and winter NAO values was similar to that between changes in harem size and NAO.

On the other hand, in southwestern Quebec, red-winged blackbird populations doubled between 1966 and 1981, apparently in response to the development of maize production. The increased availability of residual grains in spring and summer. the reproductive season will probably play a fundamental role in the growth of this bird's population. Likewise, in the mid-1990s, the reproductive population of North Dakota which at least between 1994 and 2002 was at the forefront among all the American states and Canadian provinces in terms of population density of this species began to increase rapidly.

== Gallery ==
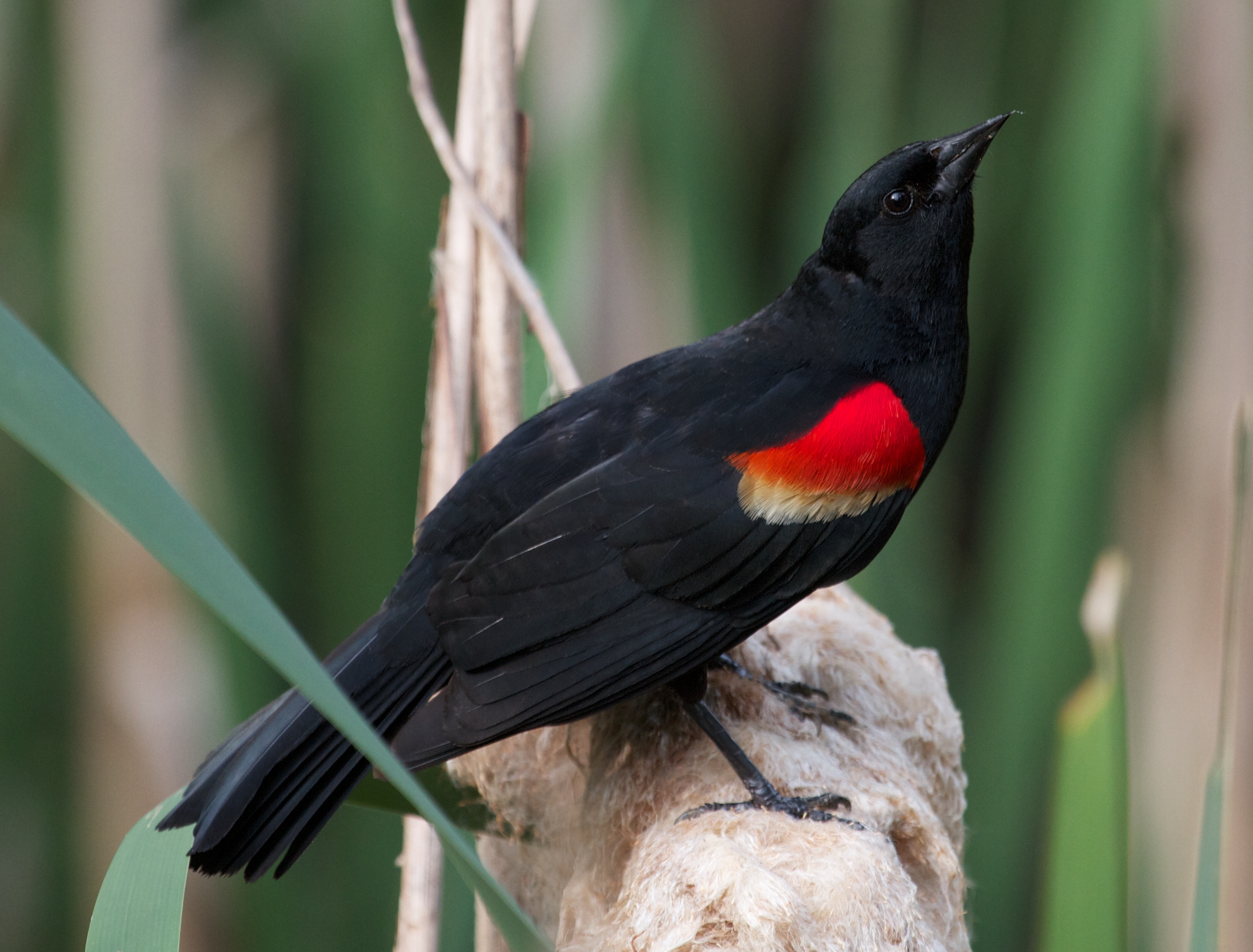
in McLean, Virginia

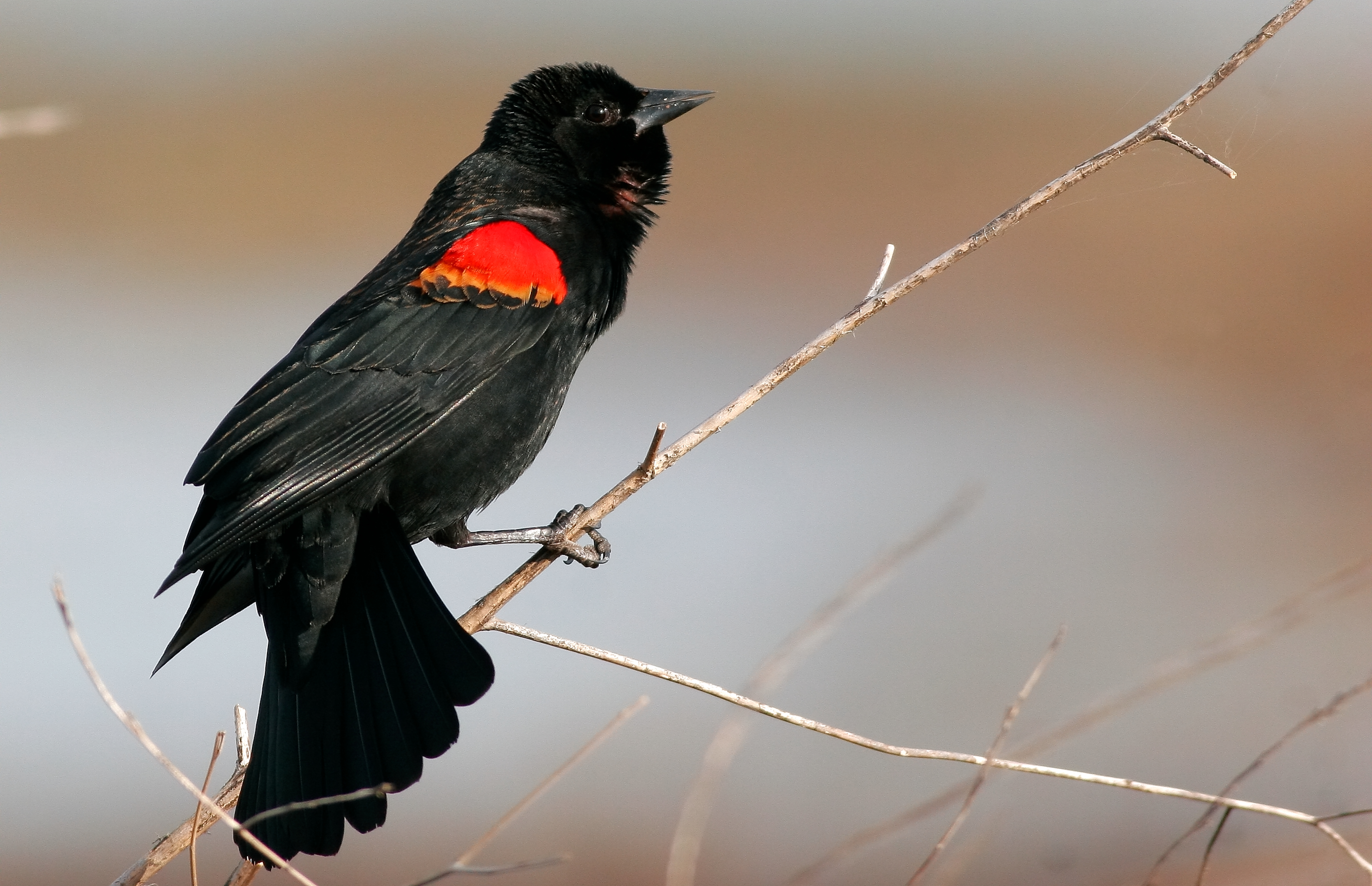
In Sacramento County. October 2016

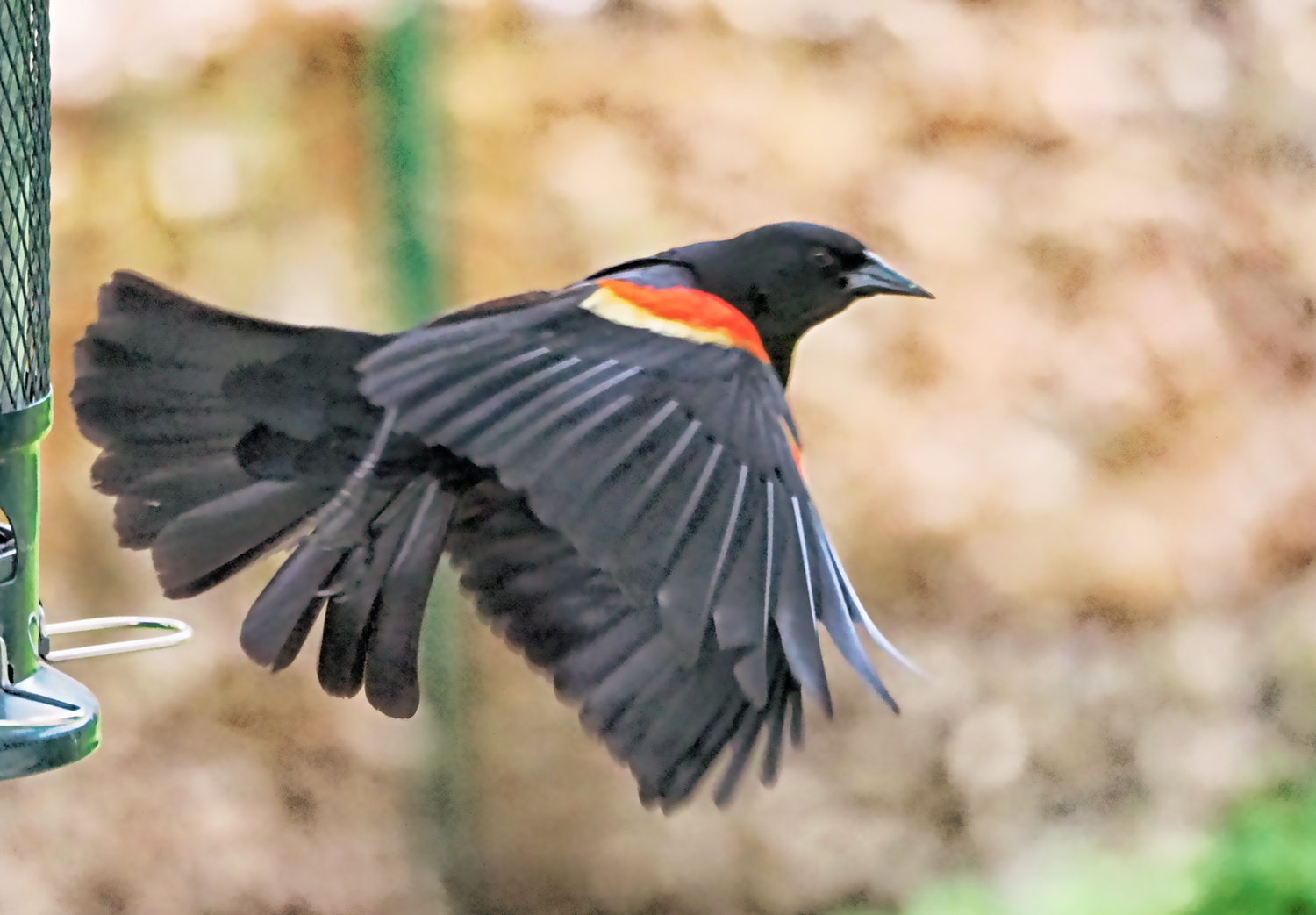
Leaving a feeder in suburban St. Louis, Missouri

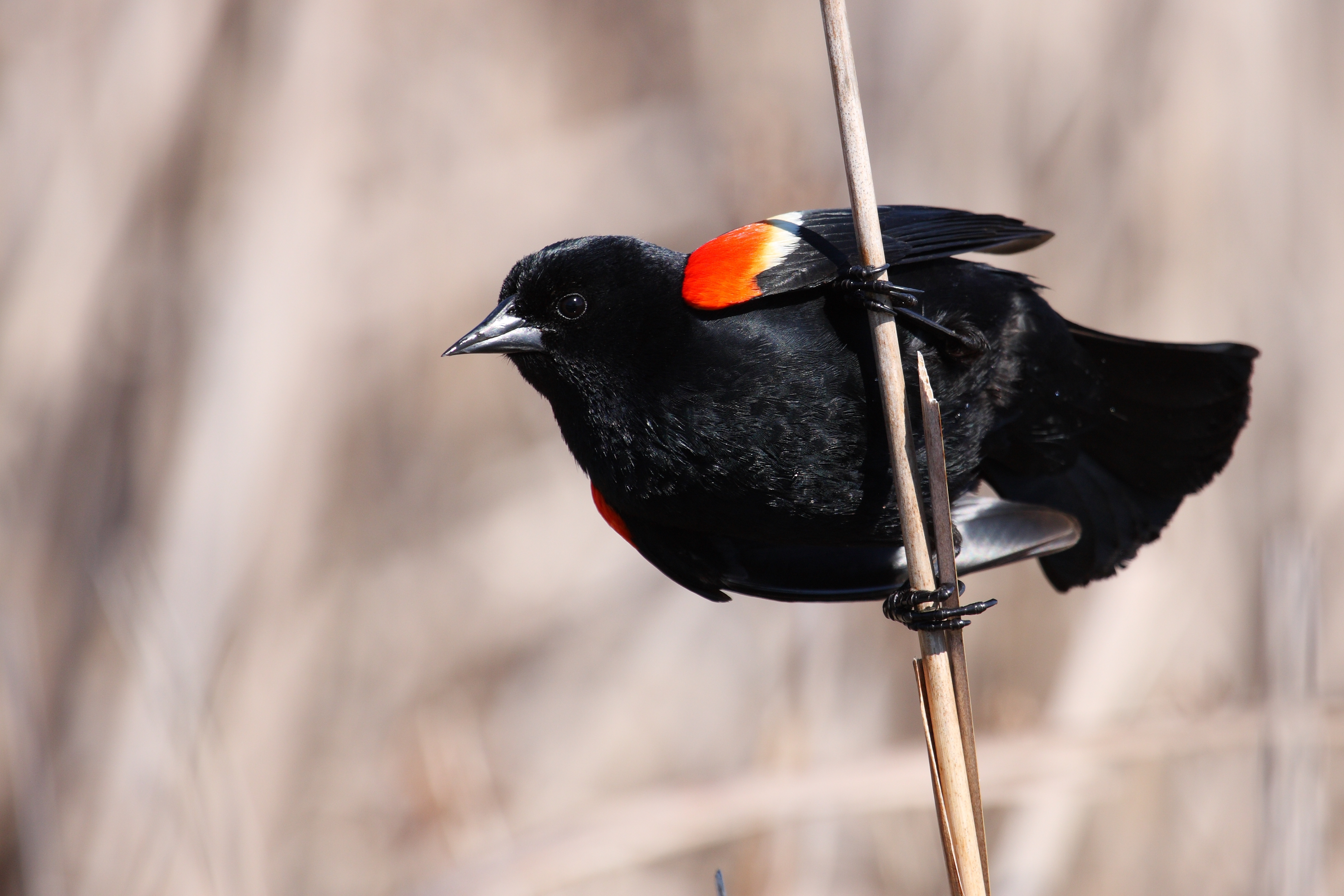
A red-winged blackbird clutching a rush in Point Pelee National Park

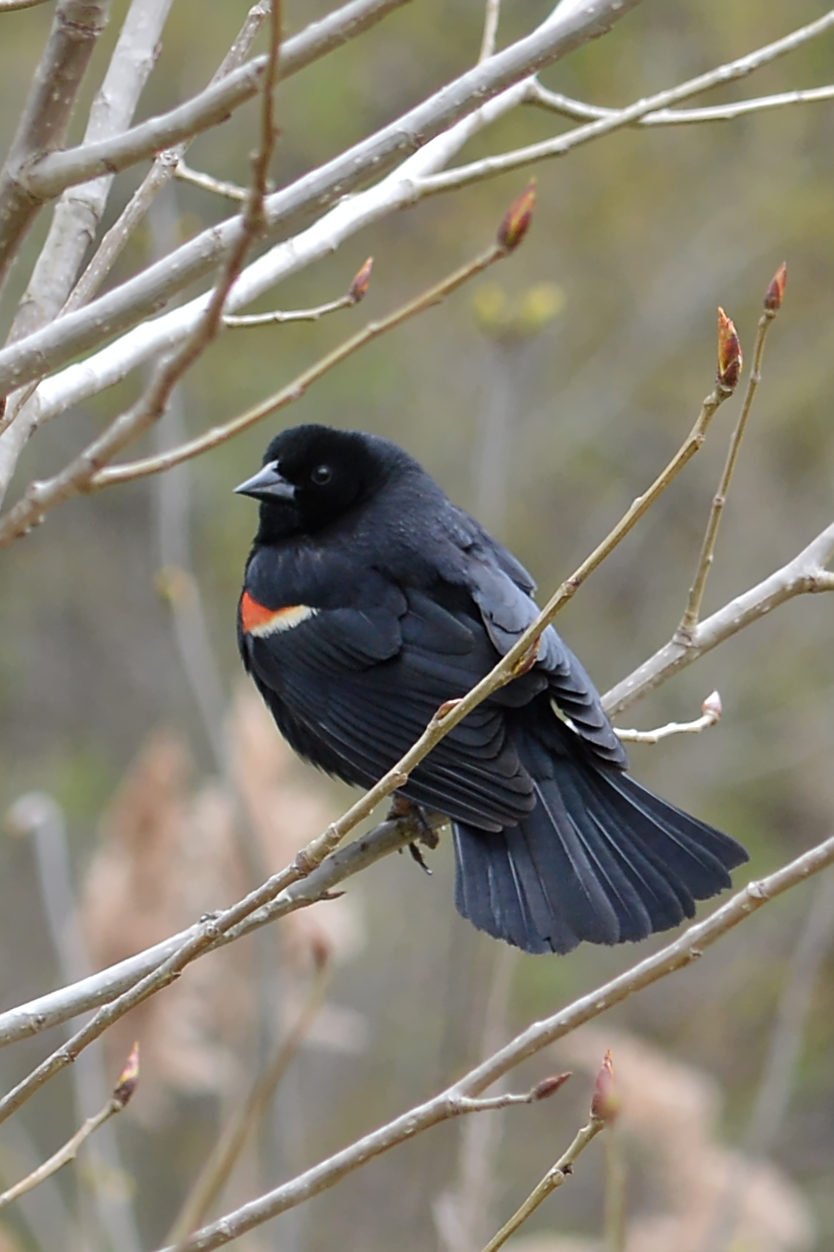
Red-winged blackbird in spring in Oakville, Ontario

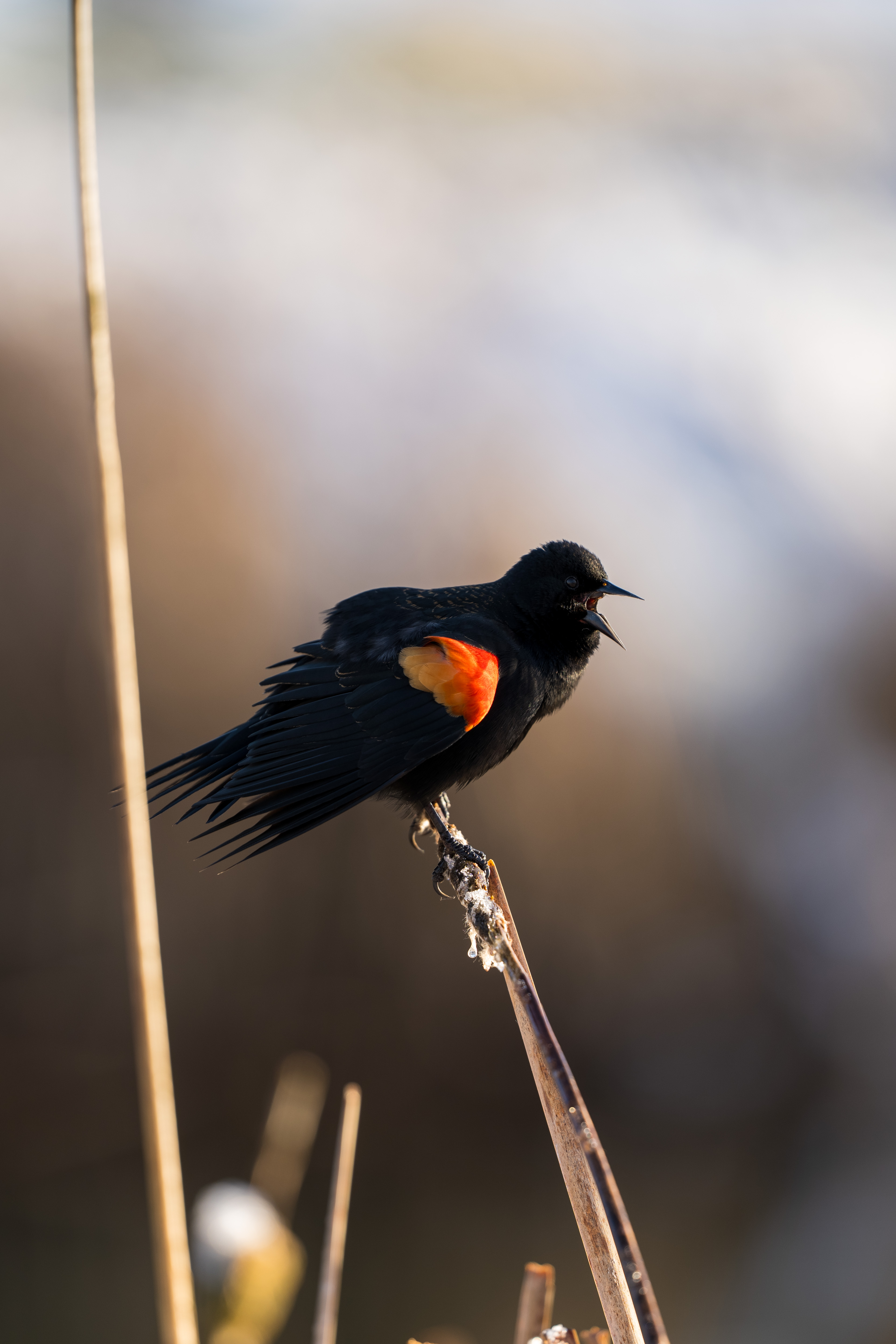
In Monroe, Washington

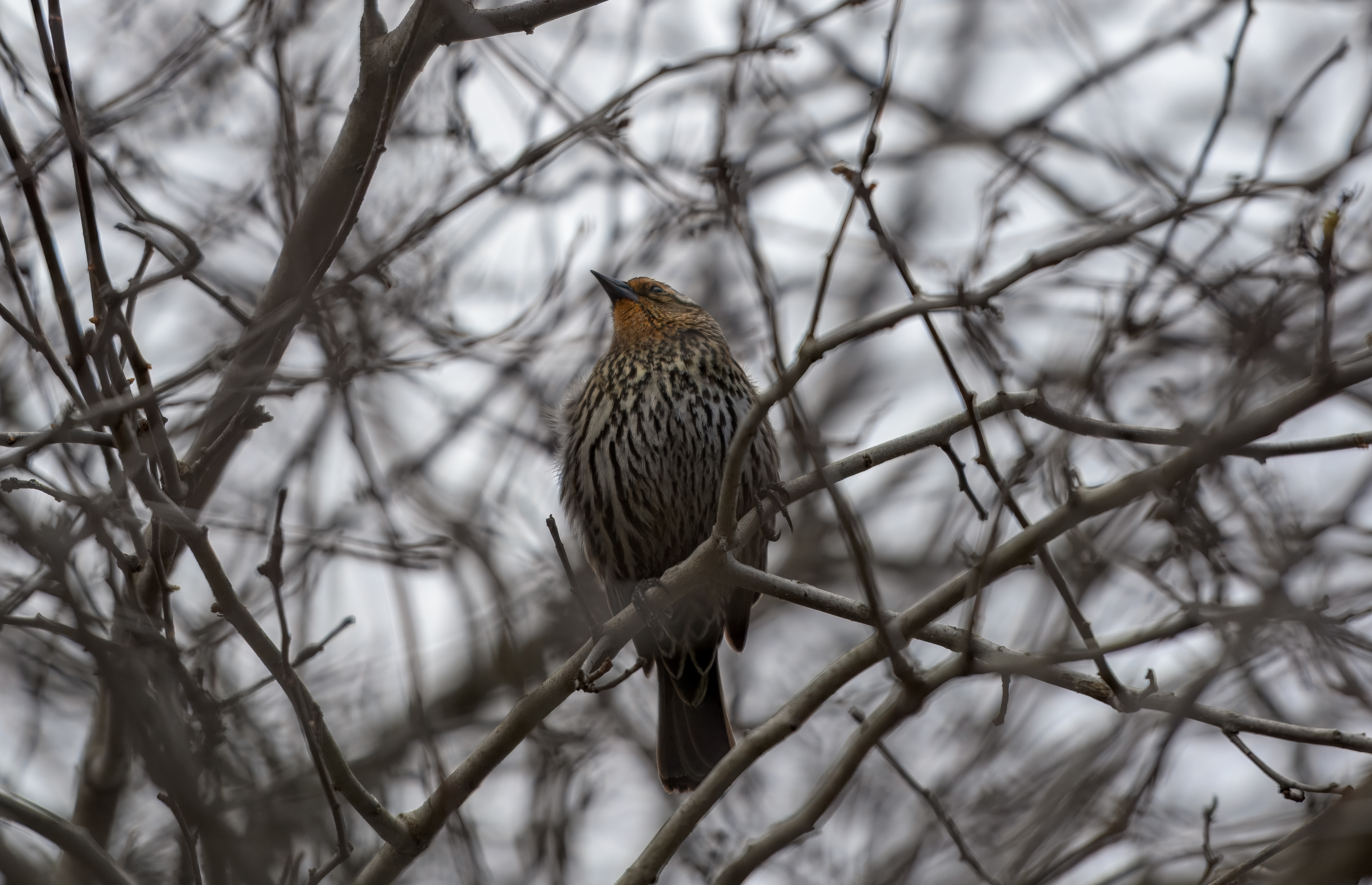
Female at Fletcher Wildlife Garden in Ottawa, Ontario

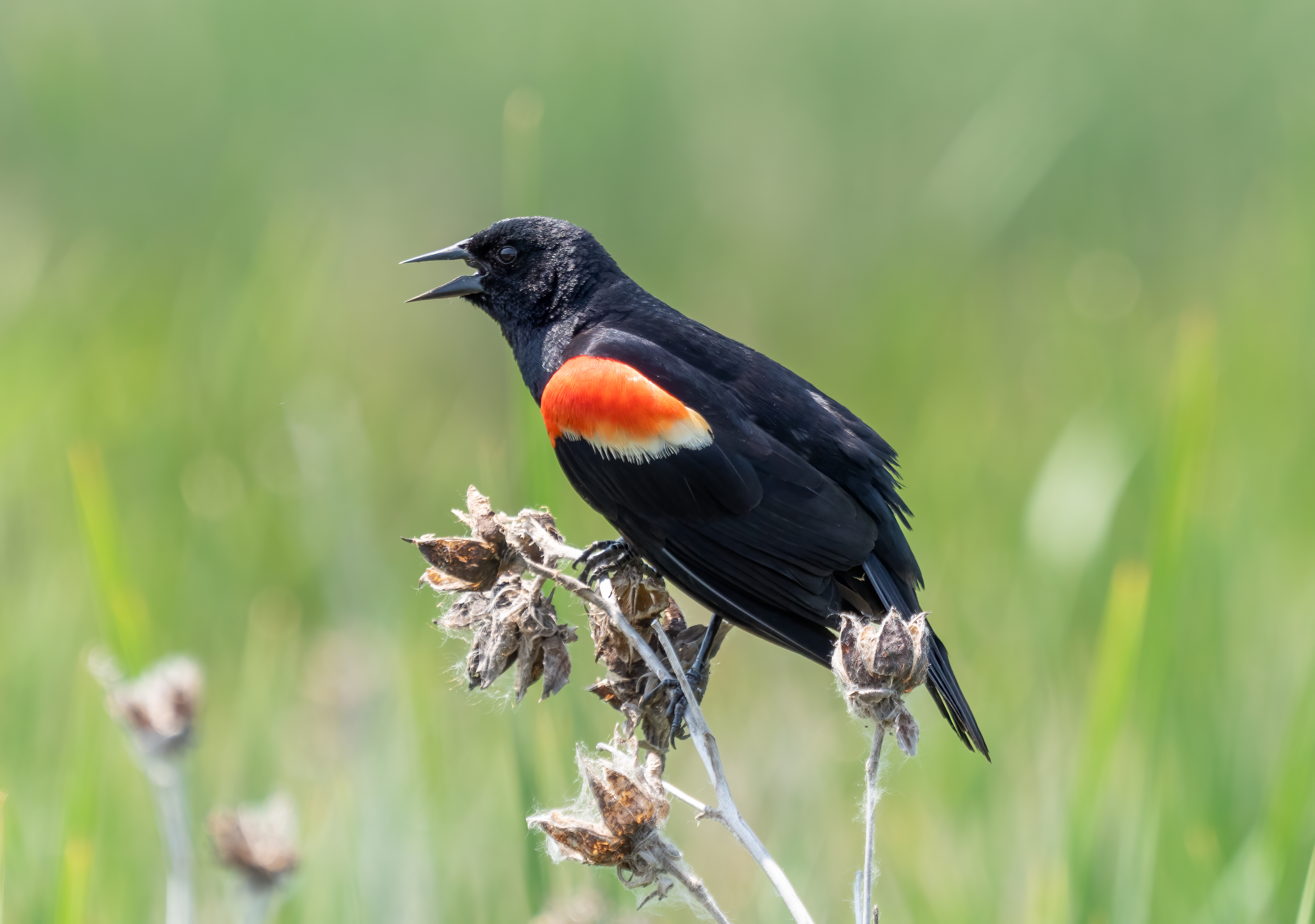
Singing in Montezuma National Wildlife Refuge, Seneca Falls, New York state
