= Richard E. Grant (paleontologist) =

American paleontologist

Richard E. Grant (1927–1994) was an American paleontologist.

== Biography ==
Grant was born in 1927. From 1972 until his death, he served as a Chairman, Curator, and a Senior Geologist in the Department of Paleobiology and National Museum of Natural History. He is most famous for studying Brachiopods of Permian period in 1979. He died in 1994.
