= Arthur Cleveland Bent =

American ornithologist

- Born: November 25, 1866
- Died: December 30, 1954 (aged 88)
- Resting place: Mount Pleasant Cemetery, Taunton, MA; 41.89415°N 71.10091°W
- Education: Harvard College
- Known for: Ornithology
- Parents: William Henry Bent; Harriet Fellowes Hendee
- Awards: John Burroughs Medal (1940); Daniel Giraud Elliot Medal (1949)

Arthur Cleveland Bent (November 25, 1866 – December 30, 1954) was an American ornithologist. He is notable for his encyclopedic 21-volume work, Life Histories of North American Birds, published 1919-1968 and completed posthumously.

Bent was brought up in Taunton, Massachusetts, where he became interested in birds as a child. He was later successful in business and traveled throughout North America, acquiring an extensive knowledge of its avifauna. From 1901 he was contributing papers to The Auk, the journal of the American Ornithologists' Union.

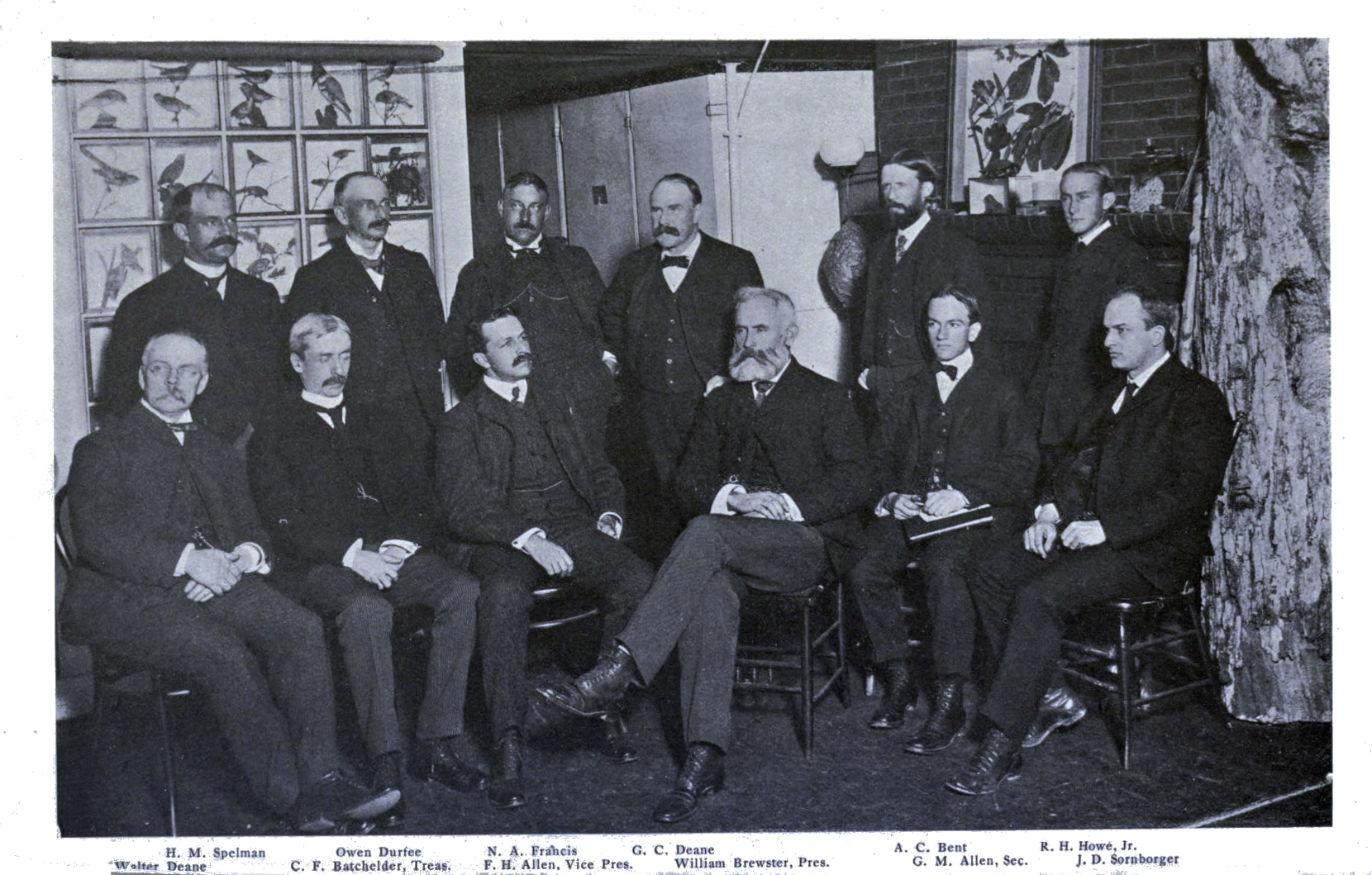
Bent with William Brewster and others of the Nuttall Club

Following a request from the Smithsonian Institution in 1910, Bent started work on the project that would dominate the rest of his life. Using his own experiences, the published literature, and contributions from hundreds of others, he put together what was at the time by far the most comprehensive repository of knowledge about the biology of the birds of North America. His accounts were published progressively in the United States National Museum Bulletin (NMB), and later republished by Dover.

In 1940 Bent was awarded the John Burroughs Medal for distinguished book-length nature writing. He was awarded the Daniel Giraud Elliot Medal from the National Academy of Sciences in 1949 .

== Life Histories – publication history ==
- 1919 - Life Histories of North American Diving Birds (NMB 107)
- 1921 - Life Histories of North American Gulls and Terns (NMB 113)
- 1922 - Life Histories of North American Petrels and Pelicans and Their Allies (NMB 121)
- 1923 - Life Histories of North American Wild Fowl (part 1) (NMB 126)
- 1925 - Life Histories of North American Wild Fowl (part 2) (NMB 130)
- 1926 - Life Histories of North American Marsh Birds (NMB 135)
- 1927 - Life Histories of North American Shore Birds (part 1) (NMB 142)
- 1929 - Life Histories of North American Shore Birds (part 2) (NMB 146)
- 1932 - Life Histories of North American Gallinaceous Birds (NMB 162)
- 1937 - Life Histories of North American Birds of Prey (part 1) (NMB 167)
- 1938 - Life Histories of North American Birds of Prey (part 2) (NMB 170)
- 1939 - Life Histories of North American Woodpeckers (NMB 174)
- 1940 - Life Histories of North American Cuckoos, Goatsuckers, Hummingbirds, and Their Allies (NMB 176)
- 1942 - Life Histories of North American Flycatchers, Larks, Swallows, and Their Allies (NMB 179)
- 1946 - Life Histories of North American Jays, Crows, and Titmice (NMB 191) (link requires registration)
- 1948 - Life Histories of North American Nuthatches, Wrens, Thrashers, and Their Allies (NMB 195)
- 1949 - Life Histories of North American Thrushes, Kinglets, and Their Allies (NMB 196)
- 1950 - Life Histories of North American Wagtails, Shrikes, Vireos, and Their Allies (NMB 197)
- 1953 - Life Histories of North American Wood Warblers (NMB 203)
- 1958 - Life Histories of North American Blackbirds, Orioles, Tanagers, and Allies (NMB 211)
- 1968 - Life Histories of North American Cardinals, Grosbeaks, Buntings, Towhees, Finches, Sparrows, and Allies (3 parts) (Arthur Cleveland Bent and Collaborators, compiled and edited by Oliver L. Austin Jr.) (NMB 237)
