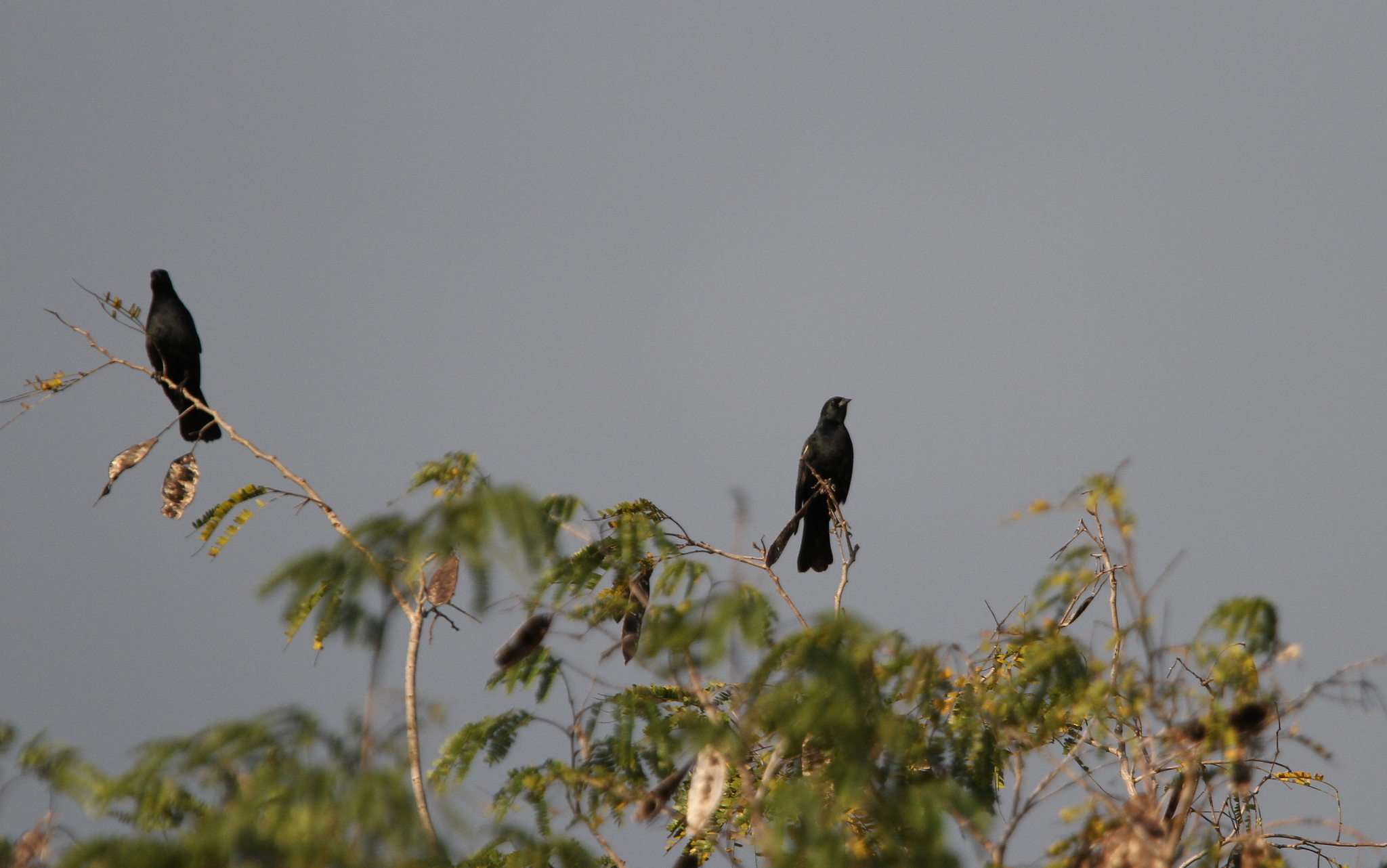

Conservation status
- Least Concern (IUCN 3.1)

Scientific classification
- Kingdom: Animalia
- Phylum: Chordata
- Class: Aves
- Order: Passeriformes
- Family: Icteridae
- Genus: Agelaius
- Species: A. assimilis

Binomial name
- Agelaius assimilis Lembeye, 1850
- Range of A. assimilis

= Red-shouldered blackbird =

Species of bird

The red-shouldered blackbird (Agelaius assimilis), known in Cuban Spanish as mayito de la ciénaga (swamp mayito) or sargento cubano (Cuban sergeant) and turpial de hombros rojos (red-shouldered troupial), is a species of passerine bird in the family Icteridae endemic to Cuba. It is similar to other species in the genus Agelaius, but recent research has established it as a separate species from the closely related red-winged blackbird (Agelaius phoeniceus).

The males are very similar to those of the red-winged blackbird (Agelaius phoeniceus), while the females are completely black, similar to the males but without the red and yellow stripes on the wings. In addition to having a different behavior, the sexual dimorphism in size and color of the plumage of the red-shouldered blackbird is less than that of the red-winged blackbird.

It is found only in the wetlands of the island of Cuba. Although its reduced range covers only 4,100 square kilometres (1,600 sq mi), it has been classified as species of least concern. In the absence of evidence of population decline or significant threats, their numbers are believed to be stable.

== Taxonomy and systematics ==
Red-shouldered blackbirds were previously considered a subspecies of red-winged blackbird (Agelaius phoeniceus). Differences in their behavior suggested to biologists that it could be a different species; This was confirmed through molecular techniques and it appears that the red-shouldered and red-winged blackbirds constitute the closest relative of each other.

The red-shouldered blackbird is one of the eleven species traditionally classified within the genus Agelaius and one of the five which continue to be considered part of it since the reclassification of the International Ornithological Congress of 2010. It belongs to the family of the icterids, which includes birds passeriness native to North America and South America.

The red-shouldered blackbird was described as a species, Agelaius assimilis, by Juan Gundlach in "Aves de la Isla de Cuba" by Lembeye (1850). Robert Ridgway (1902) also considered it an independent species based on two fundamental differences with respect to the blackbird: the plumage of the female red-shouldered blackbird was uniformly black, unlike any subspecies of red-winged blackbird, and the male was smaller than almost any form of that species. Carl Edward Hellmayr (1937), however, treated it as a subspecies of red-winged blackbird with the only explanation being that "A. p. assimilis is nothing more than a small breed of the American sergeant [red-winged blackbird] with a very dark female." Subsequent authors—such as Barbour (1943), Bond (1956), Blake (1968), Orians (1985), Sibley and Monroe (1990)—followed Hellmayr's taxonomy, although Mayr and Short (1970) considered 'assimilis' 'a sister species. Field work by Whittingham et al. (1992) showed that assimilis differed from phoeniceus populations in their social and vocal behavior. This new evidence, combined with the similarity between male and female plumage, led to the conclusion that this taxon deserves species status.

Although the red-winged blackbird exhibits large regional variations in size, the basic plumage pattern of the female, brown and intensely veined, is visible across a wide range, except in the subspecies, A. p. gubernator, were the veining of the female is greatly reduced and is restricted to the throat, while the rest of the plumage is very dark brown (but not black as in assimilis). In the Californian subspecies, A. p. californicus and A. p. mailliardorum, the veining of the female specimens also appears reduced and the plumage is dark brown, although not to the gobernator grade. Although not stated explicitly, the tendency of these populations to vary in female plumage in the direction of assimilis almost certainly influenced the decision of Hellmayr and other ornithologists to consider it the end point of variations in the plumage color of the female of A. phoeniceus.

The red-winged and red-shouldered blackbird are each other's closest relatives. The tricolored blackbird is believed to be an earlier offshoot species within the Agelaius genus.

There are two subspecies:

- A. a. assimilis – western Cuba.
- A. a. subniger – Isle of Youth. There is dispute concerning the status of this population as a subspecies.

== Description ==
The red-shouldered blackbird closely resembles the more numerous and widespread red-winged blackbird (Agelaius phoeniceus), but in contrast to phoeniceus, assimilis males and females are closer in relative size, the female is all-black instead of brown-streaked, and paired birds are monogamous. Males are about 22 centimetres (8.7 in) in length and weigh about 46 to 54 grams, while females are about 20 centimetres (7.9 in) in length and 36 to 43 grams. Like male phoeniceus, male red-shouldered blackbirds have prominent red epaulets on their wings, fringed with yellow. Immature male birds have dull epaulets, and immature females have a brownish color.

== Distribution and habitat ==
The red-shouldered blackbird is sedentary, entirely confined to a few marshy areas on western parts of Cuba and the Isla de la Juventud. The similar red-winged blackbird's range extends to western Cuba.

== Behavior ==
The red-shouldered blackbird breeds only in the swamps of western Cuba and Island of Youth. They spend the whole year in the swamps. They do not leave them to find food in areas far from their nests as do other North American icterids that reproduce in marsh habitats. Unlike the red-winged blackbird, male and female red-shouldered blackbirds feed their chicks with the same frequency. Like the tawny-shouldered blackbird (Agelaius humeralis) —another bird of the Caribbean with a restricted distribution area—and unlike Agelaius phoeniceus —which inhabits much of continental North America—, it is a species of habit non-migratory and exhibit monogamous behavior during the reproductive season, in contrast to the polygynous behavior of the red-winged blackbird.

Red-shouldered blackbirds have been observed singing and feeding in pairs during the pre-nesting period. Songs are most common in intersexual interactions before the birds are in their breeding territories. In contrast to the red-winged blackbird, the red-shouldered blackbird sings relatively little, and aggressive interactions are rare when on their breeding grounds. In this species, the songs of the male and female are similar and can occur both alone and in duets. This differs from most dueting species, in which each sex has its own songs. The song of the male and female red-shouldered blackbird resembles that of the male red-winged blackbird. When they sing in duet, the male is perched above the female in most cases, and the pair usually face each other.

Flocking behavior of assimils is similar to that of phoeniceus. Like phoeniceus, assimilis breeds in marshy areas, eating insects, seeds and fruits. Breeding season extends from April-May to August.

== Status ==
The IUCN has assessed the red-shouldered blackbird as being of Least Concern. It is common in specific areas of Cuba.
