= List of birds of Dry Tortugas National Park =

This is a comprehensive listing of the bird species recorded in Dry Tortugas National Park, which is in the U.S. state of Florida. This list is based on one published by the National Park Service (NPS) that as of February 2004 contained 281 species. Of them, 131 are occasionally observed, 11 are rarely observed, 23 are known or possible breeders, five have been introduced to North America, and one is extinct, all as defined below.

This list is presented in the taxonomic sequence of the Check-list of North and Middle American Birds, 7th edition through the 66th Supplement, published by the American Ornithological Society (AOS). Common and scientific names are also those of the Check-list, except that the common names of families are from the Clements taxonomy because the AOS list does not include them.

The NPS checklist notes the abundance of each species by season. These status codes have been used to annotate some species; those without a tag are typically observed at least 11 times in at least one season.

- (O) Occasionally observed - a species found one to five times in the season with the most records
- (R) Rarely observed - a species found six to 10 times in the season with the most records
- (B) Breeding - a species known to breed in the park
- (B?) Possibly breeding - a species whose breeding status is unknown
- (I) Introduced - a species that has been introduced to North America by the actions of humans, either directly or indirectly, and has become established in Florida
- (E) Extinct - a recent bird that no longer exists

== Ducks, geese, and waterfowl ==
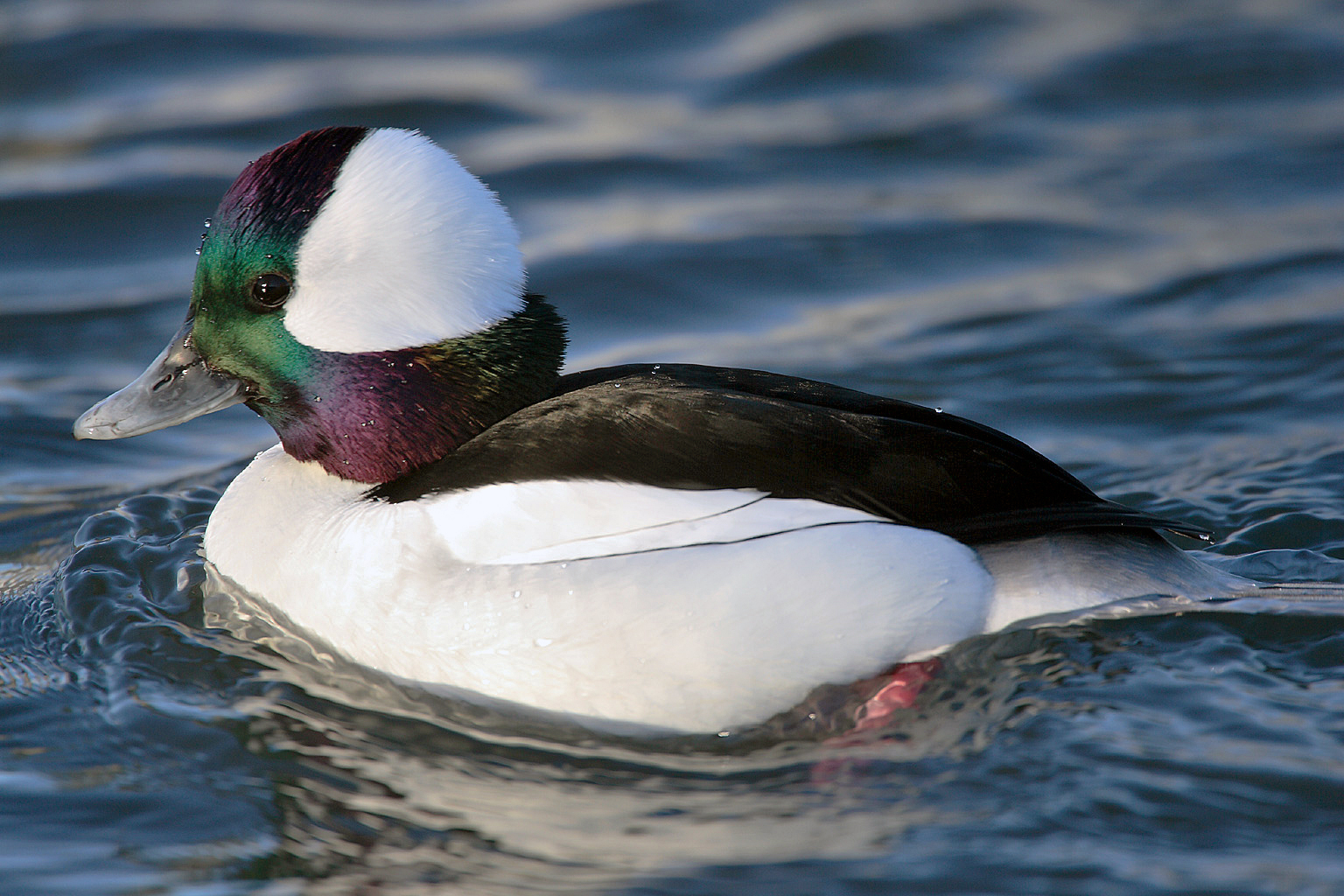
Bufflehead

Order: Anseriformes Family: Anatidae

The family Anatidae includes the ducks and most duck-like waterfowl, such as geese and swans. These birds are adapted to an aquatic existence with webbed feet, flattened bills, and feathers that are excellent at shedding water due to special oils.

- Fulvous whistling-duck, Dendrocygna bicolor (O)
- Snow goose, Anser caerulescens (O)
- Canada goose, Branta canadensis (O)
- Blue-winged teal, Spatula discors
- Northern shoveler, Spatula clypeata (O)
- Gadwall, Mareca strepera (O)
- Mallard, Anas platyrhynchos (O)
- Northern pintail, Anas acuta (O)
- Green-winged teal, Anas crecca (O)
- Ring-necked duck, Aythya collaris (O)
- Lesser scaup, Aythya affinis (O)
- Common eider, Somateria mollissima (O)
- Hooded merganser, Lophodytes cucullatus (O)
- Red-breasted merganser, Mergus serrator

== Flamingoes ==
Order: Phoenicopteriformes Family: Phoenicopteridae

Flamingoes are gregarious wading birds, usually 3 to 5 feet (0.9 to 1.5 m) tall, found in both the Western and Eastern Hemispheres. Flamingos filter-feed on shellfish and algae. Their oddly shaped beaks are adapted to separate mud and silt from the food they consume and, uniquely, are used upside-down.

- American flamingo, Phoenicopterus ruber (O)

== Grebes ==
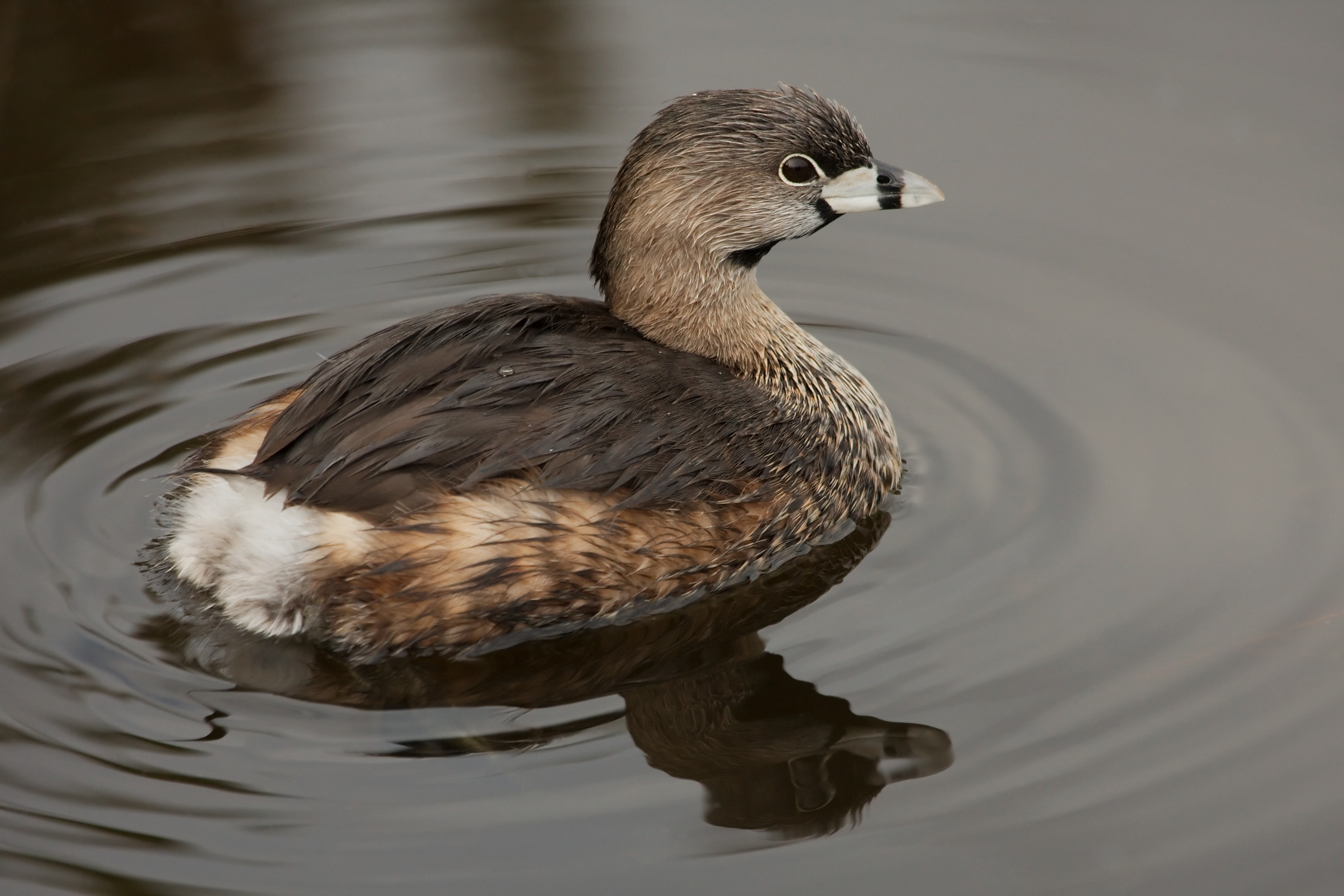
Pied-billed grebe

Order: Podicipediformes Family: Podicipedidae

Grebes are small to medium-large freshwater diving birds. They have lobed toes and are excellent swimmers and divers. However, they have their feet placed far back on the body, making them quite ungainly on land.

- Pied-billed grebe, Podilymbus podiceps (O)

== Pigeons and doves ==
Order: Columbiformes Family: Columbidae

Pigeons and doves are stout-bodied birds with short necks, and short slender bills with a fleshy cere.

- Common ground dove, Columbina passerina (O)
- Ruddy quail-dove, Geotrygon montana (O)
- White-tipped dove, Leptotila verreauxi (O)
- White-winged dove, Zenaida asiatica
- Zenaida dove, Zenaida aurita (O)
- Mourning dove, Zenaida macroura
- White-crowned pigeon, Patagioenas leucocephala (O)
- Eurasian collared-dove, Streptopelia decaocto (I) (O)
- Rock pigeon, Columba livia (I) (R)

== Cuckoos ==
Order: Cuculiformes Family: Cuculidae

The family Cuculidae includes cuckoos, roadrunners, and anis. These birds are of variable size with slender bodies, long tails, and strong legs.

- Yellow-billed cuckoo, Coccyzus americanus
- Mangrove cuckoo, Coccyzus minor (B?) (O)
- Black-billed cuckoo, Coccyzus erythropthalmus (R)
- Smooth-billed ani, Crotophaga ani (B?) (R)

== Nightjars and allies ==
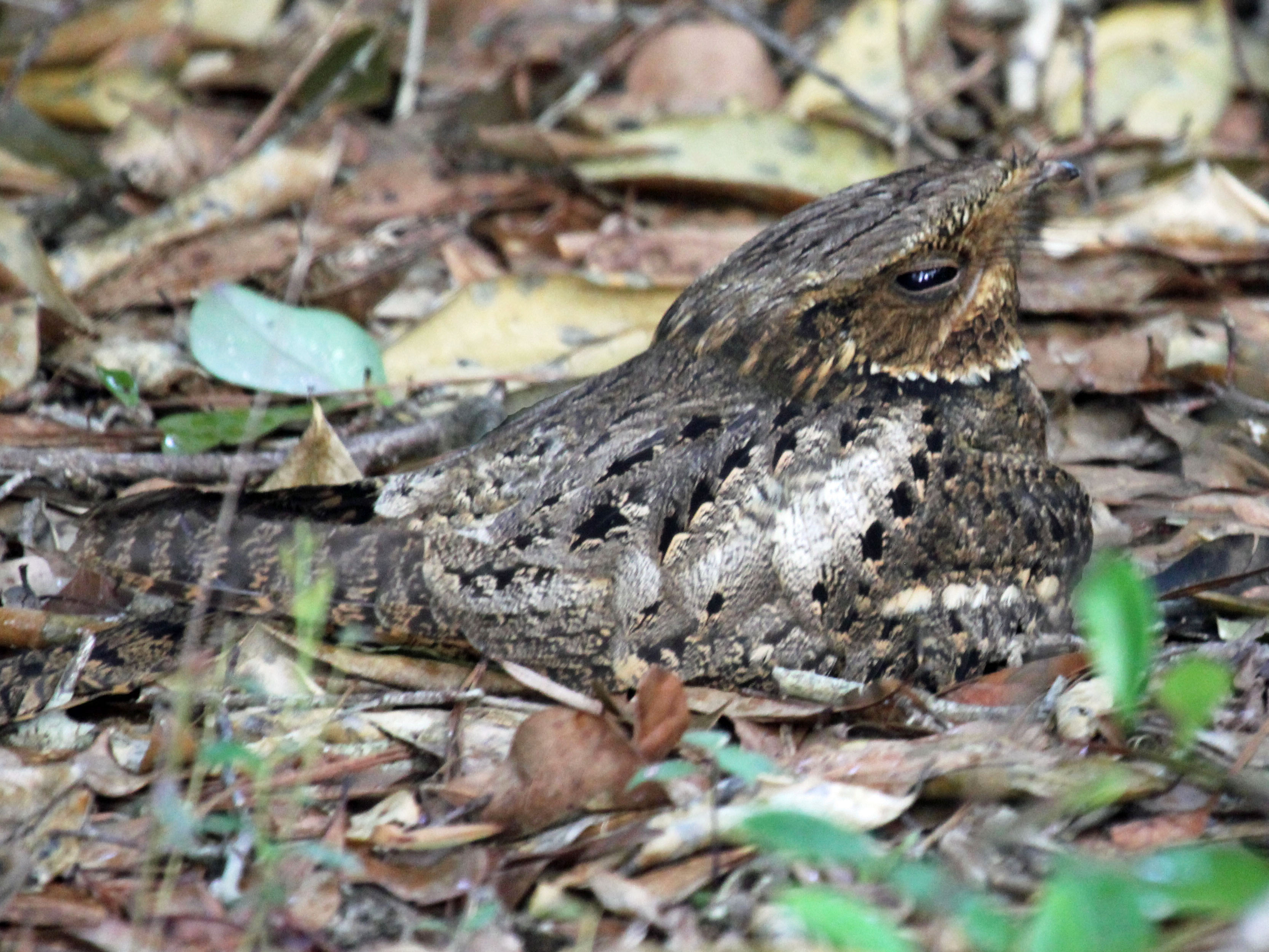
Chuck-will's-widow

Order: Caprimulgiformes Family: Caprimulgidae

Nightjars are medium-sized nocturnal birds that usually nest on the ground. They have long wings, short legs, and very short bills. Most have small feet, of little use for walking, and long pointed wings. Their soft plumage is cryptically colored to resemble bark or leaves.

- Lesser nighthawk, Chordeiles acutipennis (O)
- Common nighthawk, Chordeiles minor
- Antillean nighthawk, Chordeiles gundlachii (R)
- Chuck-will's-widow, Antrostomus carolinensis
- Eastern whip-poor-will, Antrostomus vociferus (O)

== Swifts ==
Order: Apodiformes Family: Apodidae

The swifts are small birds, spending most of their lives flying. They have very short legs and never settle voluntarily on the ground, perching instead only on vertical surfaces. Many swifts have very long swept-back wings which resemble a crescent or boomerang.

- Black swift, Cypseloides niger (One record in the NPS checklist; not on the official Florida Ornithological Society list)
- Chimney swift, Chaetura pelagica

== Hummingbirds ==
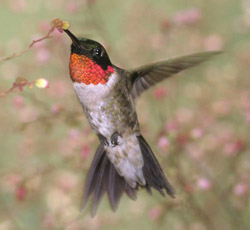
Ruby-throated hummingbird

Order: Apodiformes Family: Trochilidae

Hummingbirds are small birds capable of hovering in mid-air due to the rapid flapping of their wings. They are the only birds that can fly backwards.

- Ruby-throated hummingbird, Archilochus colubris
- Black-chinned hummingbird, Archilochus alexandri (O)

== Limpkin ==
Order: Gruiformes Family: Aramidae

The limpkin is an odd bird that looks like a large rail, but is skeletally closer to the cranes. It is found in marshes with some trees or scrub in the Caribbean, South America, and southern Florida.

- Limpkin, Aramus guarauna (O)

== Cranes ==
Order: Gruiformes Family: Gruidae

Cranes are large, tall birds with long legs and long necks. Unlike the similar-looking but un-related herons, cranes fly with necks extended. Most have elaborate and noisy courtship displays or "dances". When in a group, they may also "dance" for no particular reason, jumping up and down in an elegant manner, seemingly just for pleasure or to attract a mate.

- Sandhill crane, Antigone canadensis (O)

== Rails, gallinules, and coots ==
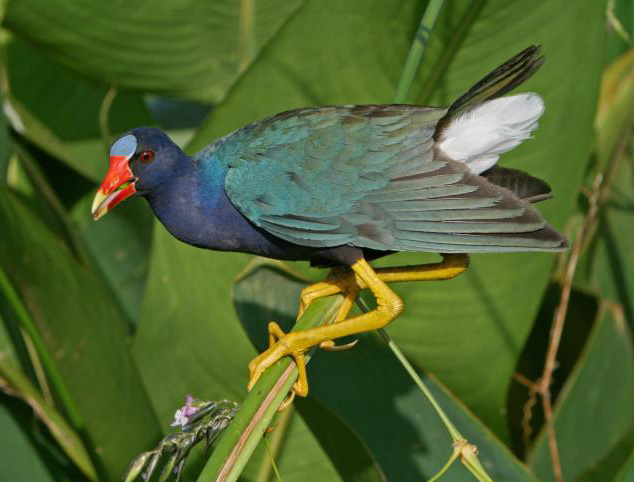
Purple gallinule

Order: Gruiformes Family: Rallidae

The Rallidae is a large family of small to medium-sized birds which includes the rails, crakes, coots, and gallinules. The most typical family members occupy dense vegetation in damp environments near lakes, swamps, or rivers. In general they are shy and secretive, making them difficult to observe. Most have strong legs with long toes, short rounded wings, and are weak fliers.

- Clapper rail, Rallus crepitans (O)
- King rail, Rallus elegans (O)
- Virginia rail, Rallus limicola (O)
- Sora, Porzana carolina
- Common gallinule, Gallinula galeata (B?) (O)
- American coot, Fulica americana (O)
- Purple gallinule, Porphyrio martinicus
- Black rail, Laterallus jamaicensis (O)

== Stilts and avocets ==
Order: Charadriiformes Family: Recurvirostridae

Recurvirostridae is a family of large wading birds which includes the avocets and stilts. The avocets have long legs and long up-curved bills. The stilts have extremely long legs and long, thin, straight bills.

- Black-necked stilt, Himantopus mexicanus
- American avocet, Recurvirostra americana (O)

== Oystercatchers ==
Order: Charadriiformes Family: Haematopodidae

The oystercatchers are large, conspicuous, and noisy plover-like birds, with strong bills used for smashing or prising open molluscs.

- American oystercatcher, Haematopus palliatus (O)

== Plovers and lapwings ==
Order: Charadriiformes Family: Charadriidae

The family Charadriidae includes the plovers, dotterels, and lapwings. They are small to medium-sized birds with compact bodies, short thick necks, and long, usually pointed, wings. They are generally found in open country, mostly in habitats near water.

- Black-bellied plover, Pluvialis squatarola
- American golden-plover, Pluviali dominicas
- Killdeer, Charadrius vociferus
- Semipalmated plover, Charadrius semipalmatus
- Piping plover, Charadrius melodus (R)
- Wilson's plover, Charadrius wilsonia (R)

== Sandpipers and allies ==
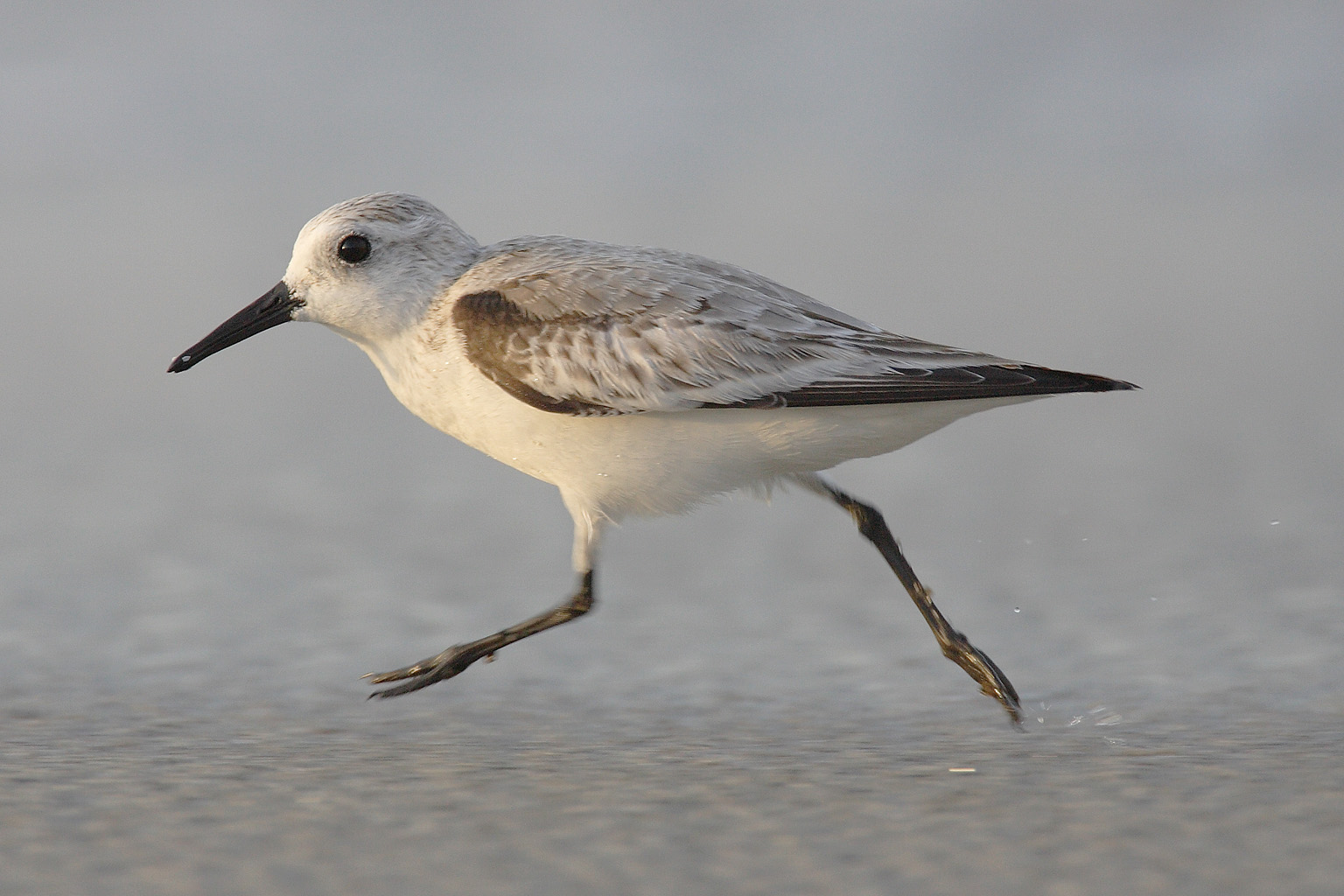
Sanderling

Order: Charadriiformes Family: Scolopacidae

Scolopacidae is a large and diverse family of small to medium-sized shorebirds which includes the sandpipers, curlews, godwits, shanks, tattlers, woodcocks, snipes, dowitchers, and phalaropes. Most eat small invertebrates picked out of the mud or sand. Different lengths of legs and bills enable multiple species to feed in the same habitat, particularly on the coast, without direct competition for food.

- Upland sandpiper, Bartramia longicauda
- Whimbrel, Numenius phaeopus (R)
- Long-billed curlew, Numenius americanus (O)
- Ruddy turnstone, Arenaria interpres
- Red knot, Calidris canutus (O)
- Ruff, Calidris pugnax (O)
- Stilt sandpiper, Calidris himantopus (O)
- Sanderling, Calidris alba
- Dunlin, Calidris alpina (O)
- Baird's sandpiper, Calidris bairdii (O)
- Least sandpiper, Calidris minutilla
- White-rumped sandpiper, Calidris fuscicollis
- Buff-breasted sandpiper, Calidris subruficollis (O)
- Pectoral sandpiper, Calidris melanotos (R)
- Semipalmated sandpiper, Calidris pusilla
- Western sandpiper, Calidris mauri (R)
- Short-billed dowitcher, Limnodromus griseus
- Long-billed dowitcher, Limnodromus scolopaceus (O)
- American woodcock, Scolopax minor (O)
- Wilson's snipe, Gallinago delicata (R)
- Spotted sandpiper, Actitis macularius
- Solitary sandpiper, Tringa solitaria (R)
- Lesser yellowlegs, Tringa flavipes
- Willet, Tringa semipalmata
- Greater yellowlegs, Tringa melanoleuca
- Wilson's phalarope, Phalaropus tricolor (O)
- Red-necked phalarope, Phalaropus lobatus (O)

== Skuas and jaegers ==
Order: Charadriiformes Family: Stercorariidae

Skuas are medium to large seabirds, typically with gray or brown plumage, often with white markings on the wings. They have longish bills with hooked tips and webbed feet with sharp claws. They look like large dark gulls, but have a fleshy cere above the upper mandible. They are strong, acrobatic fliers.

- Pomarine jaeger, Stercorarius pomarinus (O)
- Parasitic jaeger, Stercorarius parasiticus (O)

== Auks, murres, and puffins ==
Order: Charadriiformes Family: Alcidae

Alcids are superficially similar to penguins due to their black-and-white colors, their upright posture, and some of their habits; however they are not closely related to penguins and are (with one extinct exception) able to fly. Auks live on the open sea, only deliberately coming ashore to breed.

- Dovekie, Alle alle (O)

== Gulls, terns, and skimmers ==
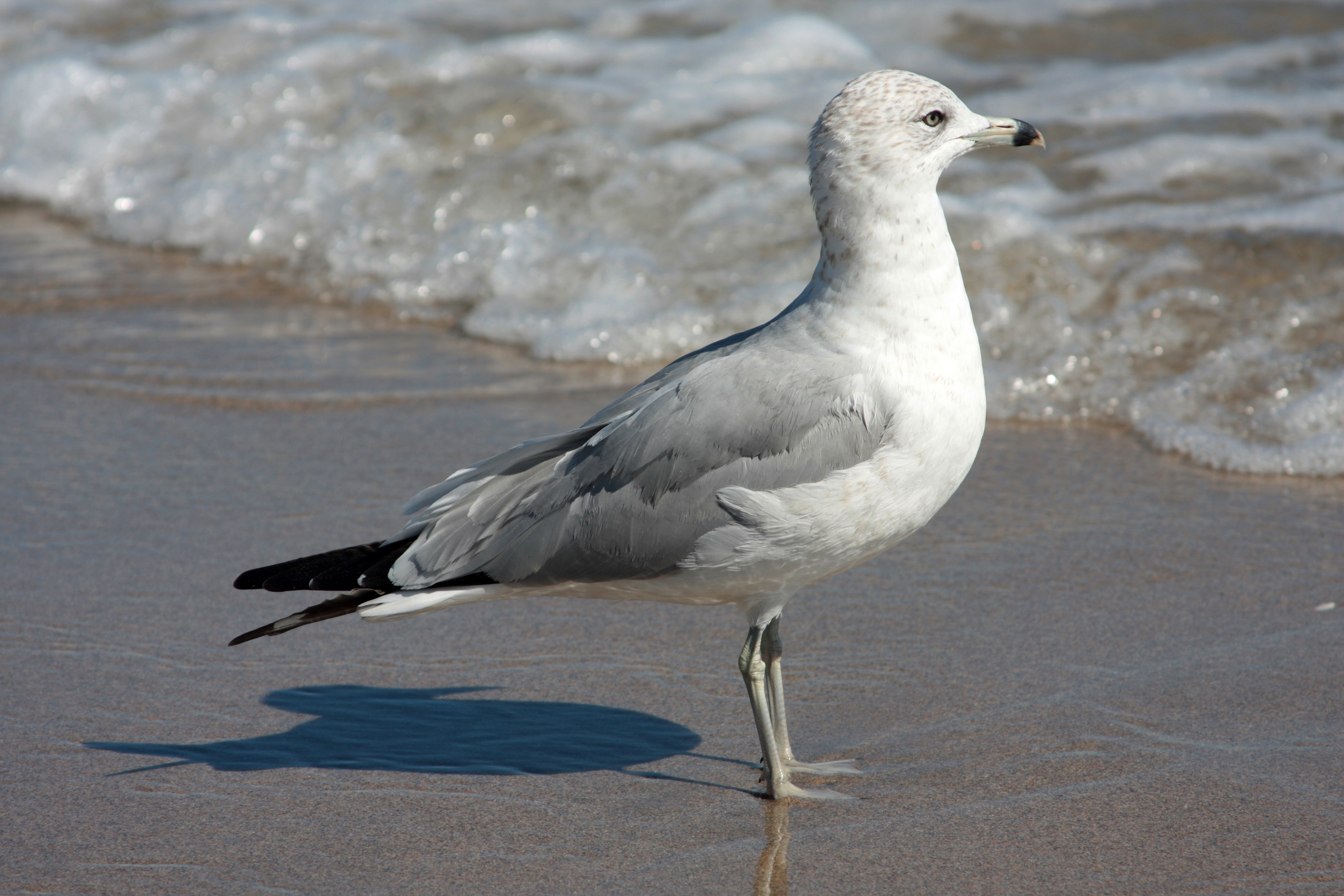
Ring-billed gull

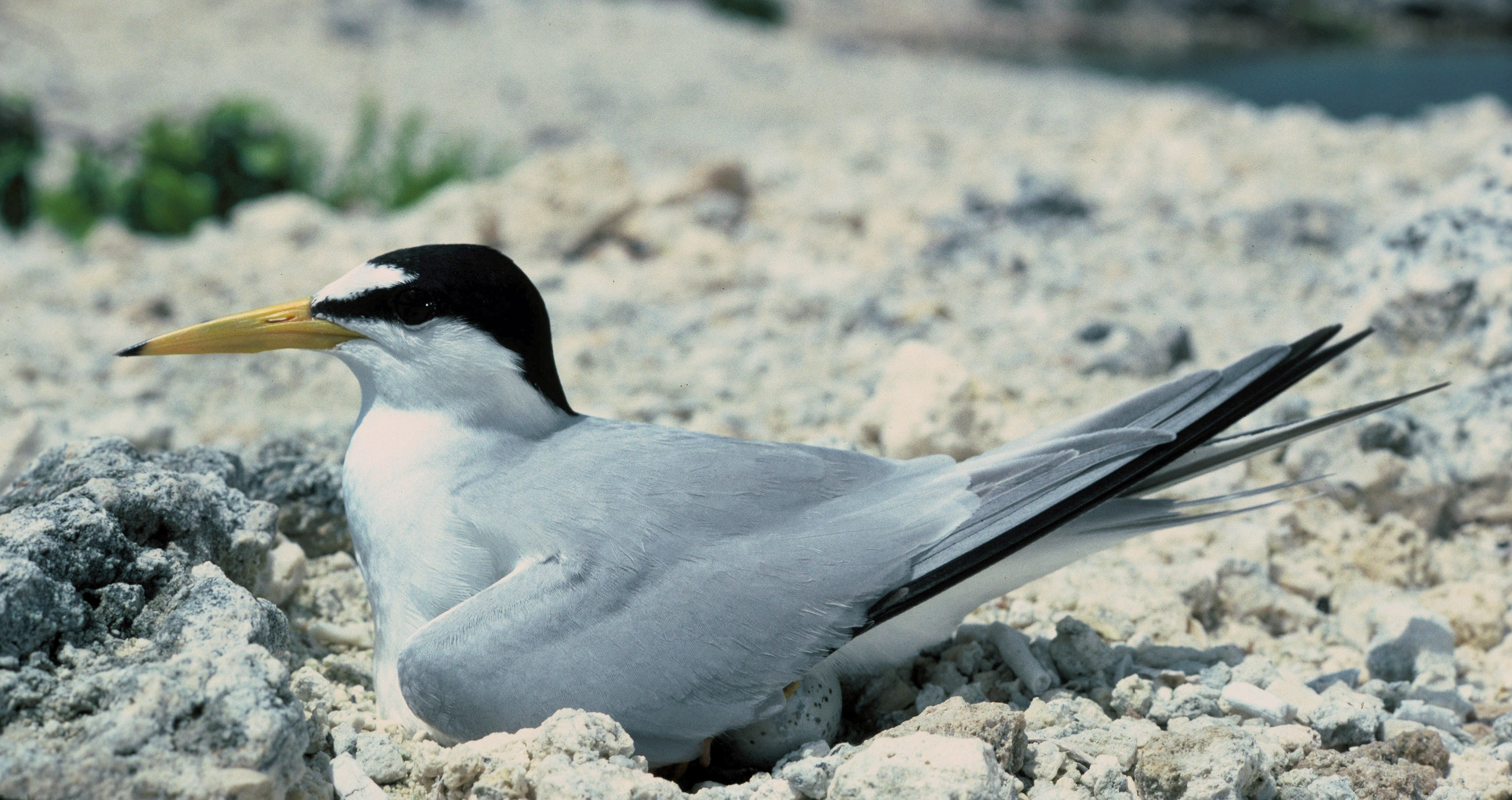
Least tern

Order: Charadriiformes Family: Laridae

The Laridae are a family of medium to large seabirds and containing the gulls, terns, kittiwakes, and skimmers. They are typically gray or white, often with black markings on the head or wings. They have stout, longish bills and webbed feet.

- Sabine's gull, Xema sabini (O)
- Bonaparte's gull, Chroicocephalus philadelphia (O)
- Laughing gull, Leucophaeus atricilla (B)
- Ring-billed gull, Larus delawarensis
- Herring gull, Larus argentatus
- Lesser black-backed gull, Larus fuscus (O)
- Glaucous gull, Larus hyperboreus (O)
- Great black-backed gull, Larus marinus (O)
- Brown noddy, Anous stolidus (B)
- Black noddy, Anous minutus (R)
- Sooty tern, Onychoprion fuscata (B)
- Bridled tern, Onychoprion anaethetus (O)
- Least tern, Sternula antillarum (B) (R)
- Gull-billed tern, Gelochelidon nilotica (O)
- Caspian tern, Hydroprogne caspia (R)
- Black tern, Chlidonias niger (O)
- Roseate tern, Sterna dougallii (B)
- Common tern, Sterna hirundo (B?) (R)
- Forster's tern, Sterna forsteri (R)
- Royal tern, Thalasseus maxima (B?)
- Sandwich tern, Thalasseus sandvicensis
- Black skimmer, Rynchops niger

== Tropicbirds ==
Order: Phaethontiformes Family: Phaethontidae

Tropicbirds are slender white birds of tropical oceans with exceptionally long central tail feathers. Their long wings have black markings, as does the head.

- White-tailed tropicbird, Phaethon lepturus (B?)

== Loons ==
Order: Gaviiformes Family: Gaviidae

Loons are aquatic birds the size of a large duck, to which they are unrelated. Their plumage is largely gray or black and they have spear-shaped bills. Loons swim well and fly adequately but, because their legs are placed towards the rear of the body, are clumsy on land.

- Pacific loon, Gavia pacifica (O)
- Common loon, Gavia immer (R)

== Southern storm-petrels ==
Order: Procellariiformes Family: Oceanitidae

The storm-petrels are the smallest seabirds, relatives of the petrels, feeding on planktonic crustaceans and small fish picked from the surface, typically while hovering. The flight is fluttering and sometimes bat-like. Until 2018, this family's three species were included with the other storm-petrels in family Hydrobatidae.

- Wilson's storm-petrel, Oceanites oceanicus (R)

== Northern storm-petrels ==
Order: Procellariiformes Family: Hydrobatidae

Though the members of this family are similar in many respects to the southern storm-petrels, including their general appearance and habits, there are enough genetic differences to warrant their placement in a separate family.

- Band-rumped storm-petrel, Hydrobates castro (O)

== Shearwaters and petrels ==
Order: Procellariiformes Family: Procellariidae

The procellariids are the main group of medium-sized "true petrels", characterized by united tubular nostrils with a median septum.

- Sargasso shearwater, Puffinus lherminieri (O)

== Frigatebirds ==
Order: Suliformes Family: Fregatidae

Frigatebirds are large seabirds usually found over tropical oceans. They are large, black, or black-and-white, with long wings and deeply forked tails. The males have colored inflatable throat pouches. They do not swim or walk and cannot take off from a flat surface. Having the largest wingspan-to-body-weight ratio of any bird, they are essentially aerial, able to stay aloft for more than a week.

- Magnificent frigatebird, Fregata magnificens (B)

== Boobies and gannets ==
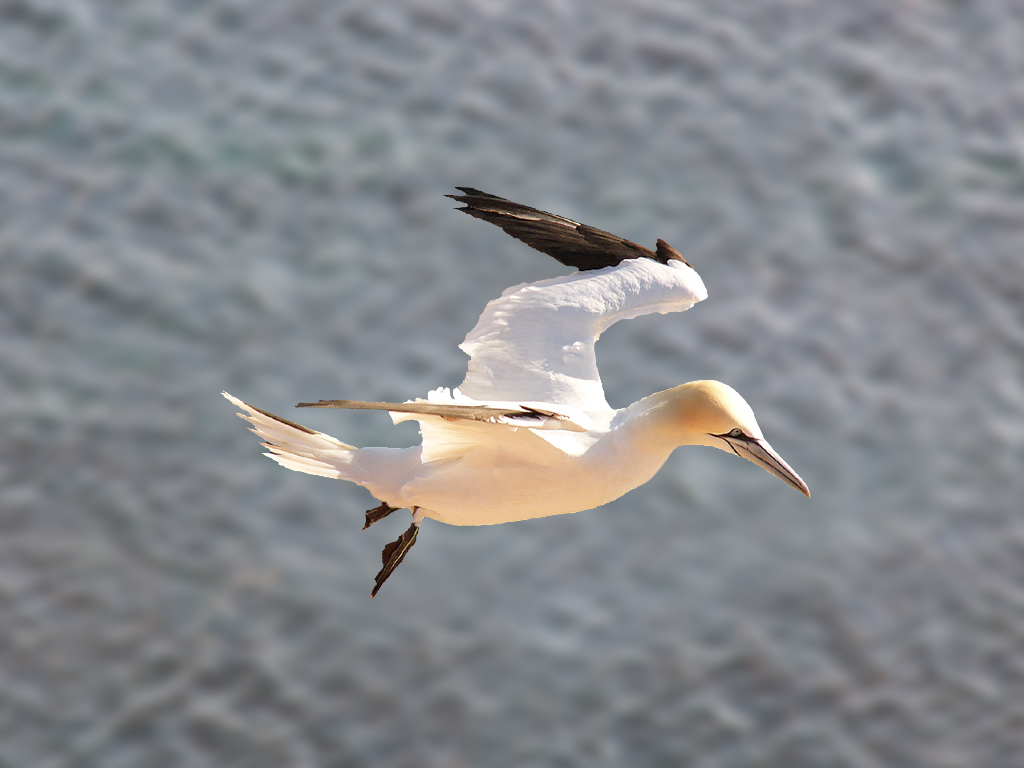
Northern gannet

Order: Suliformes Family: Sulidae

The sulids comprise the gannets and boobies. Both groups are medium-large coastal seabirds that plunge-dive for fish.

- Masked booby, Sula dactylatra (B)
- Brown booby, Sula leucogaster (B?)
- Red-footed booby, Sula sula (R)
- Northern gannet, Morus bassanus (R)

== Anhingas ==
Order: Suliformes Family: Anhingidae

Anhingas, also known as darters or snakebirds, are cormorant-like water birds with long necks and long, straight beaks. They are fish eaters, diving for long periods, and often swim with only their neck above the water, looking rather like a water snake.

- Anhinga, Anhinga anhinga (O)

== Cormorants and shags ==
Order: Suliformes Family: Phalacrocoracidae

Cormorants are medium-to-large aquatic birds, usually with mainly dark plumage and areas of colored skin on the face. The bill is long, thin, and sharply hooked. Their feet are four-toed and webbed.

- Double-crested cormorant, Nannopterum auritum

== Ibises and spoonbills ==
Order: Pelecaniformes Family: Threskiornithidae

The family Threskiornithidae includes the ibises and spoonbills. They have long, broad wings. Their bodies are elongated, the neck more so, with long legs. The bill is also long, curved downward in the ibises, straight and markedly flattened in the spoonbills.

- White ibis, Eudocimus albus
- Glossy ibis, Plegadis falcinellus (R)
- Roseate spoonbill, Platalea ajaja (O)

== Pelicans ==
Order: Pelecaniformes Family: Pelecanidae

Pelicans are very large water birds with a distinctive pouch under their beak. Like other birds in the order Pelecaniformes, they have four webbed toes.

- American white pelican, Pelecanus erythrorhynchos (O)
- Brown pelican, Pelecanus occidentalis (B)

== Herons, egrets, and bitterns ==
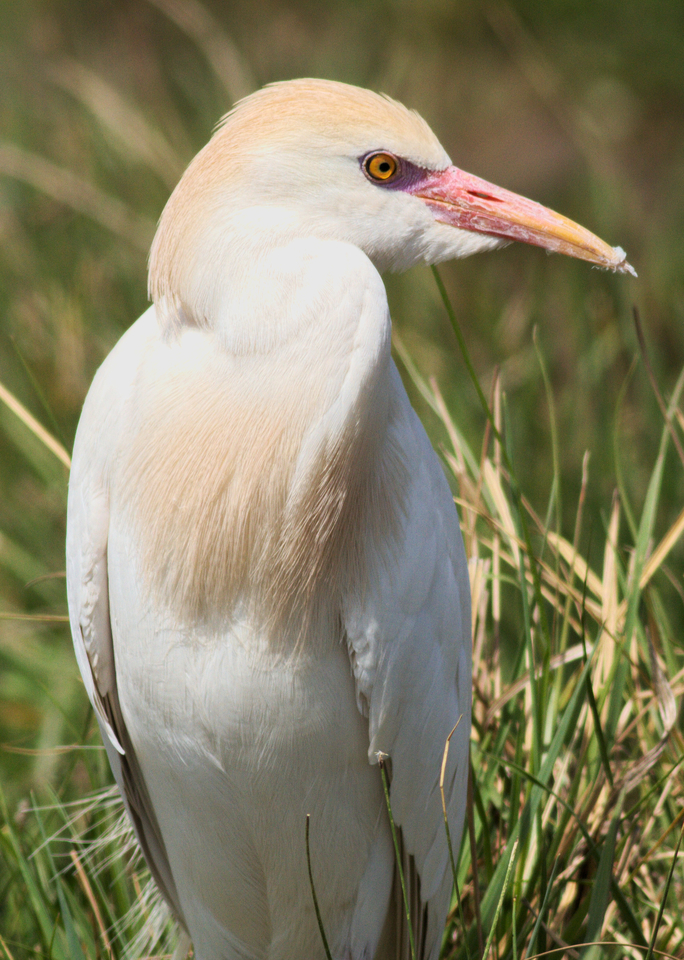
Cattle egret

Order: Pelecaniformes Family: Ardeidae

The family Ardeidae contains the herons, egrets, and bitterns. Herons and egrets are wading birds with long necks and legs. Herons are large and egrets are smaller. The cattle egret or "cow bird" is seen amongst flocks of cattle, for instance in ranches north of the Everglades. A bird will often attach itself to a particular bull, cow or calf, even being tolerated perching on the back or even the head of the animal. The birds are more shy than the animals, and will fly away if approached. The birds feed on various items turned over by the cattle as they graze and tramp the ground. Bitterns tend to be shorter necked and more secretive. Unlike other long-necked birds such as storks, ibises, and spoonbills, members of the Ardeidae fly with their necks pulled back into a curve.

- American bittern, Botaurus lentiginosus (O)
- Least bittern, Ixobrychus exilis (R)
- Great blue heron, Ardea herodias
- Great egret, Ardea alba
- Snowy egret, Egretta thula
- Little blue heron, Egretta caerulea
- Tricolored heron, Egretta tricolor
- Reddish egret, Egretta rufescens (O)
- Cattle egret, Bubulcus ibis
- Green heron, Butorides virescens (B?)
- Black-crowned night-heron, Nycticorax nycticorax (R)
- Yellow-crowned night-heron, Nyctanassa violacea

== New World vultures ==
Order: Cathartiformes Family: Cathartidae

New World vultures are not closely related to Old World vultures, but superficially resemble them because of convergent evolution. Like the Old World vultures, they are scavengers. Unlike Old World vultures, which find carcasses by sight, New World vultures have a good sense of smell with which they locate carcasses.

- Turkey vulture, Cathartes aura (O)

== Osprey ==
Order: Accipitriformes Family: Pandionidae

Pandionidae is a family of fish-eating birds of prey possessing a very large, powerful hooked beak for tearing flesh from their prey, strong legs, powerful talons, and keen eyesight. The family is monotypic.

- Osprey, Pandion haliaetus

== Hawks, eagles, and kites ==
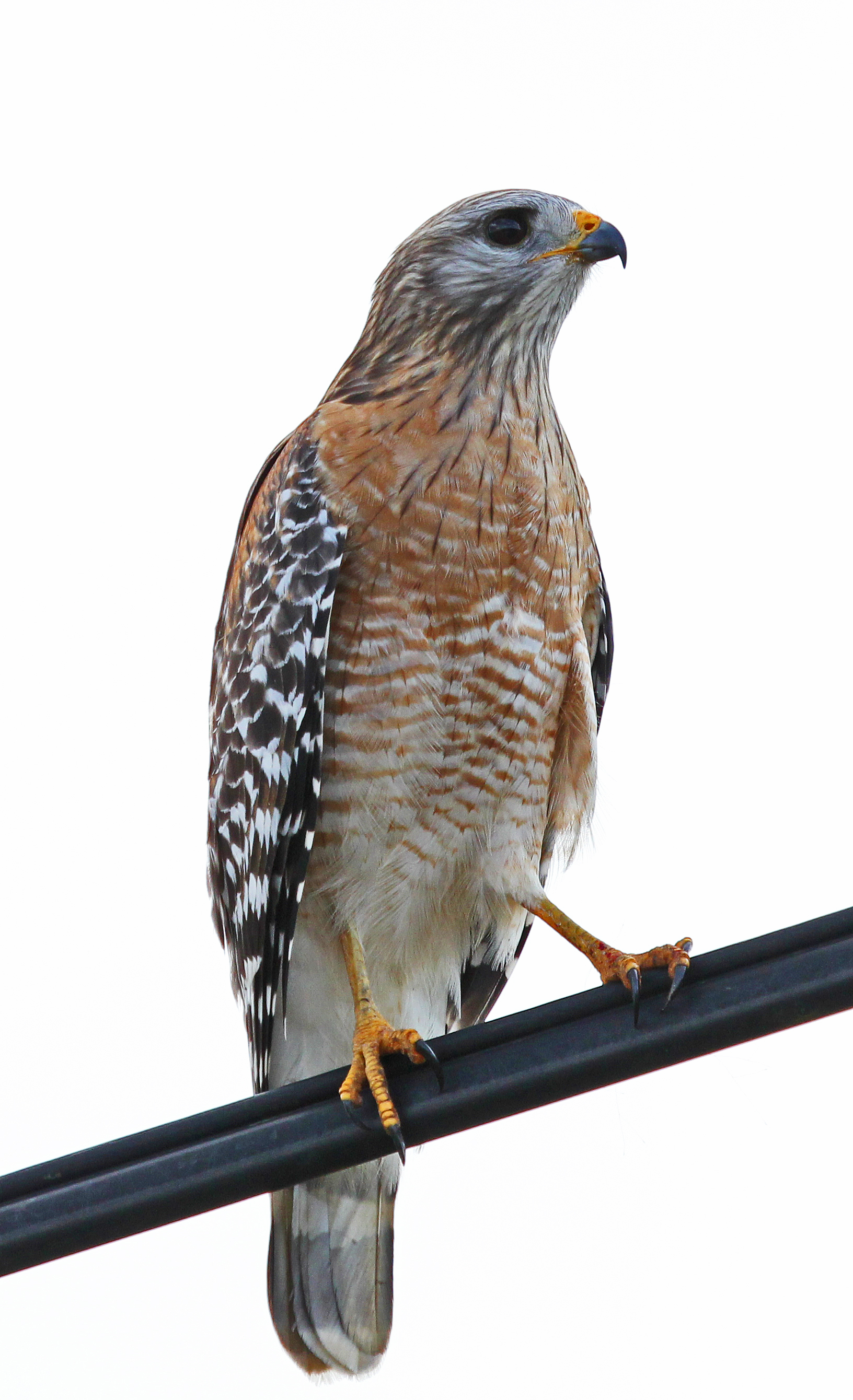
Red-shouldered hawk

Order: Accipitriformes Family: Accipitridae

Accipitridae is a family of birds of prey that includes hawks, eagles, kites, harriers, and Old World vultures. They have very large, hooked beaks for tearing flesh from their prey, strong legs, powerful talons, and keen eyesight.

- Swallow-tailed kite, Elanoides forficatus (O)
- Sharp-shinned hawk, Accipiter striatus
- Cooper's hawk, Astur cooperii (O)
- Northern harrier, Circus hudsonius
- Red-shouldered hawk, Buteo lineatus (R)
- Broad-winged hawk, Buteo platypterus
- Swainson's hawk, Buteo swainsoni (O)
- Red-tailed hawk, Buteo jamaicensis (O)

== Barn-owls ==
Order: Strigiformes Family: Tytonidae

Barn-owls are medium to large owls with large heads and characteristic heart-shaped faces. They have long strong legs with powerful talons.

- Barn owl, Tyto alba (O)

== Owls ==
Order: Strigiformes Family: Strigidae

Typical owls are small to large solitary nocturnal birds of prey. They have large forward-facing eyes and ears, a hawk-like beak, and a conspicuous circle of feathers around each eye called a facial disk.

- Eastern screech-owl, Megascops asio (O)
- Burrowing owl, Athene cunicularia (R)
- Barred owl, Strix varia (O)
- Long-eared owl, Asio otus (O)
- Short-eared owl, Asio flammeus

== Kingfishers ==
Order: Coraciiformes Family: Alcedinidae

Kingfishers are medium-sized birds with large heads, long pointed bills, short legs, and stubby tails.

- Belted kingfisher, Megaceryle alcyon

== Woodpeckers ==
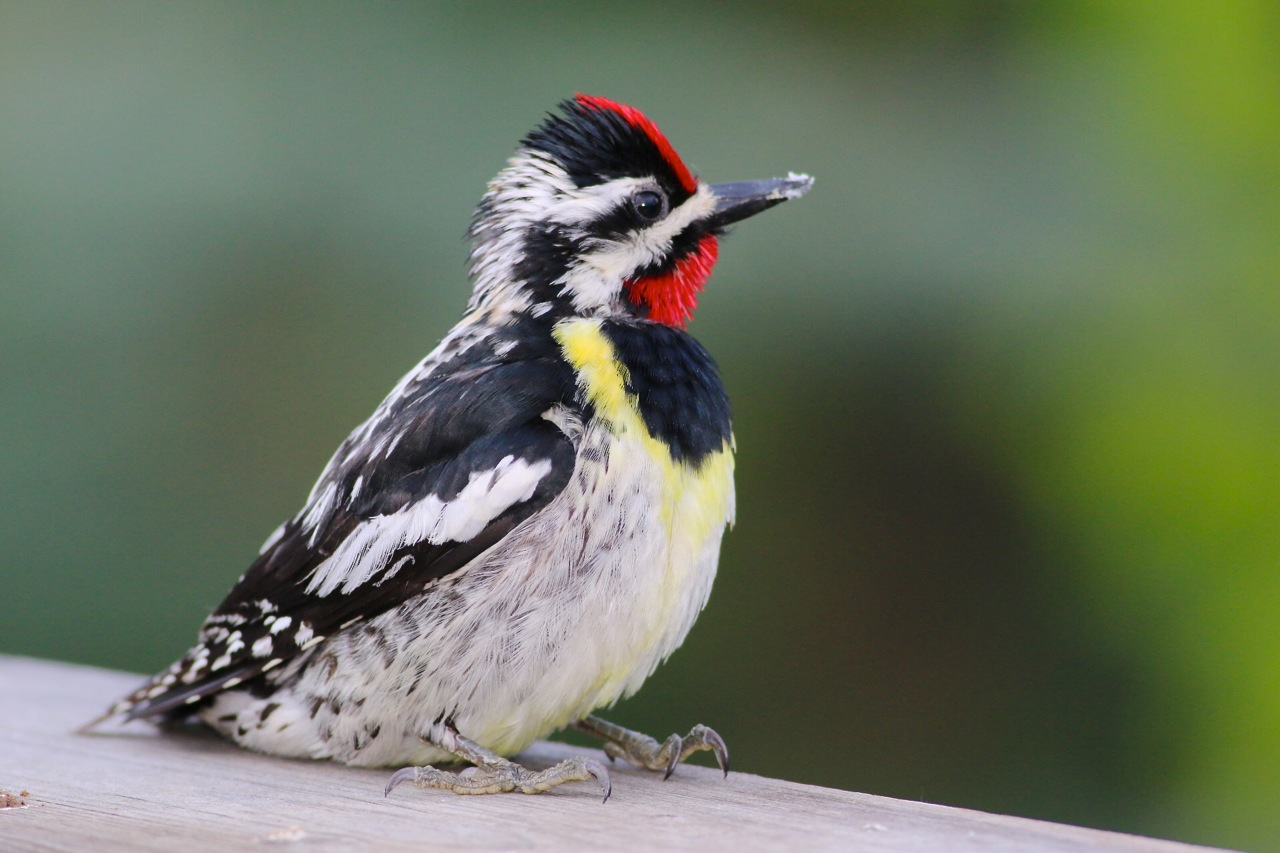
Yellow-bellied sapsucker

Order: Piciformes Family: Picidae

Woodpeckers are small to medium-sized birds with chisel-like beaks, short legs, stiff tails, and long tongues used for capturing insects. Some species have feet with two toes pointing forward and two backward, while several species have only three toes. Many woodpeckers have the habit of tapping noisily on tree trunks with their beaks.

- Red-headed woodpecker, Melanerpes erythrocephalus (O)
- Yellow-bellied sapsucker, Sphyrapicus varius
- Hairy woodpecker, Dryobates villosus (O)
- Northern flicker, Colaptes auratus (O)

== Falcons and caracaras ==
Order: Falconiformes Family: Falconidae

The Falconidae is a family of diurnal birds of prey containing the falcons and caracaras. They differ from hawks, eagles, and kites in that they kill with their beaks instead of their talons.

- American kestrel, Falco sparverius
- Merlin, Falco columbarius
- Peregrine falcon, Falco peregrinus

== Tyrant flycatchers ==
Order: Passeriformes Family: Tyrannidae

Tyrant flycatchers are passerines which occur throughout North and South America. They superficially resemble the Old World flycatchers, but are more robust and have stronger bills. They do not have the sophisticated vocal capabilities of the songbirds. Most, but not all, are rather plain. As the name implies, most are insectivorous.

- Great crested flycatcher, Myiarchus crinitus (R)
- La Sagra's flycatcher, Myiarchus sagrae (O)
- Variegated flycatcher, Empidonomus varius (O)
- Tropical kingbird, Tyrannus melancholicus (O)
- Western kingbird, Tyrannus verticalis (R)
- Eastern kingbird, Tyrannus tyrannus
- Gray kingbird, Tyrannus dominicensis (B?)
- Scissor-tailed flycatcher, Tyrannus forficatus (O)
- Fork-tailed flycatcher, Tyrannus savana (O)
- Olive-sided flycatcher, Contopus cooperi (O)
- Eastern wood-pewee, Contopus virens
- Cuban pewee, Contopus cariibaeus (O)
- Yellow-bellied flycatcher, Empidonax flaviventris (O)
- Acadian flycatcher, Empidonax virescens (O)
- Least flycatcher, Empidonax minimus (O)
- Black phoebe, Sayornis nigricans (O)
- Eastern phoebe, Sayornis phoebe (R)

== Vireos, shrike-babblers, and erpornis ==
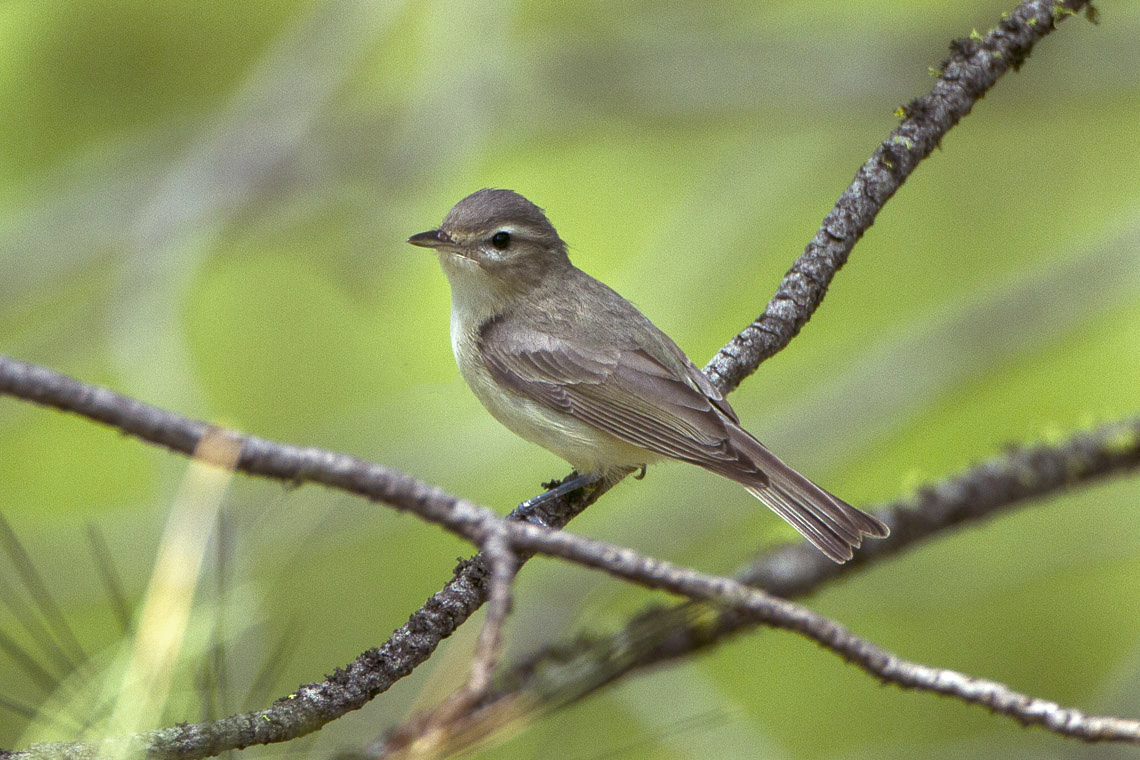
Warbling vireo

Order: Passeriformes Family: Vireonidae

The vireos are a group of small to medium-sized passerines restricted to the New World. They are typically greenish in color and resemble wood warblers apart from their heavier bills.

- White-eyed vireo, Vireo griseus
- Thick-billed vireo, Vireo crassirostris (O)
- Yellow-throated vireo, Vireo flavifrons
- Blue-headed vireo, Vireo solitarius
- Philadelphia vireo, Vireo philadelphicus (R)
- Warbling vireo, Vireo gilvus (R)
- Red-eyed vireo, Vireo olivaceus
- Black-whiskered vireo, Vireo altiloquus (B?)

== Shrikes ==
Order: Passeriformes Family: Laniidae

Shrikes are passerines known for their habit of catching other birds and small animals and impaling the uneaten portions of their bodies on thorns. A shrike's beak is hooked, like that of a typical bird of prey.

- Loggerhead shrike, Lanius ludovicianus (O)

== Crows, jays, and magpies ==
Order: Passeriformes Family: Corvidae

The family Corvidae includes crows, ravens, jays, choughs, magpies, treepies, nutcrackers, and ground jays. Corvids are above average in size among the Passeriformes and some of the larger species show high levels of intelligence.

- American crow, Corvus brachyrhynchos (O)

== Tits, chickadees, and titmice ==
Order: Passeriformes Family: Paridae

The Paridae are mainly small stocky woodland species with short stout bills. Some have crests. They are adaptable birds, with a mixed diet including seeds and insects.

- Tufted titmouse, Baeolophus bicolor (O)

== Swallows ==
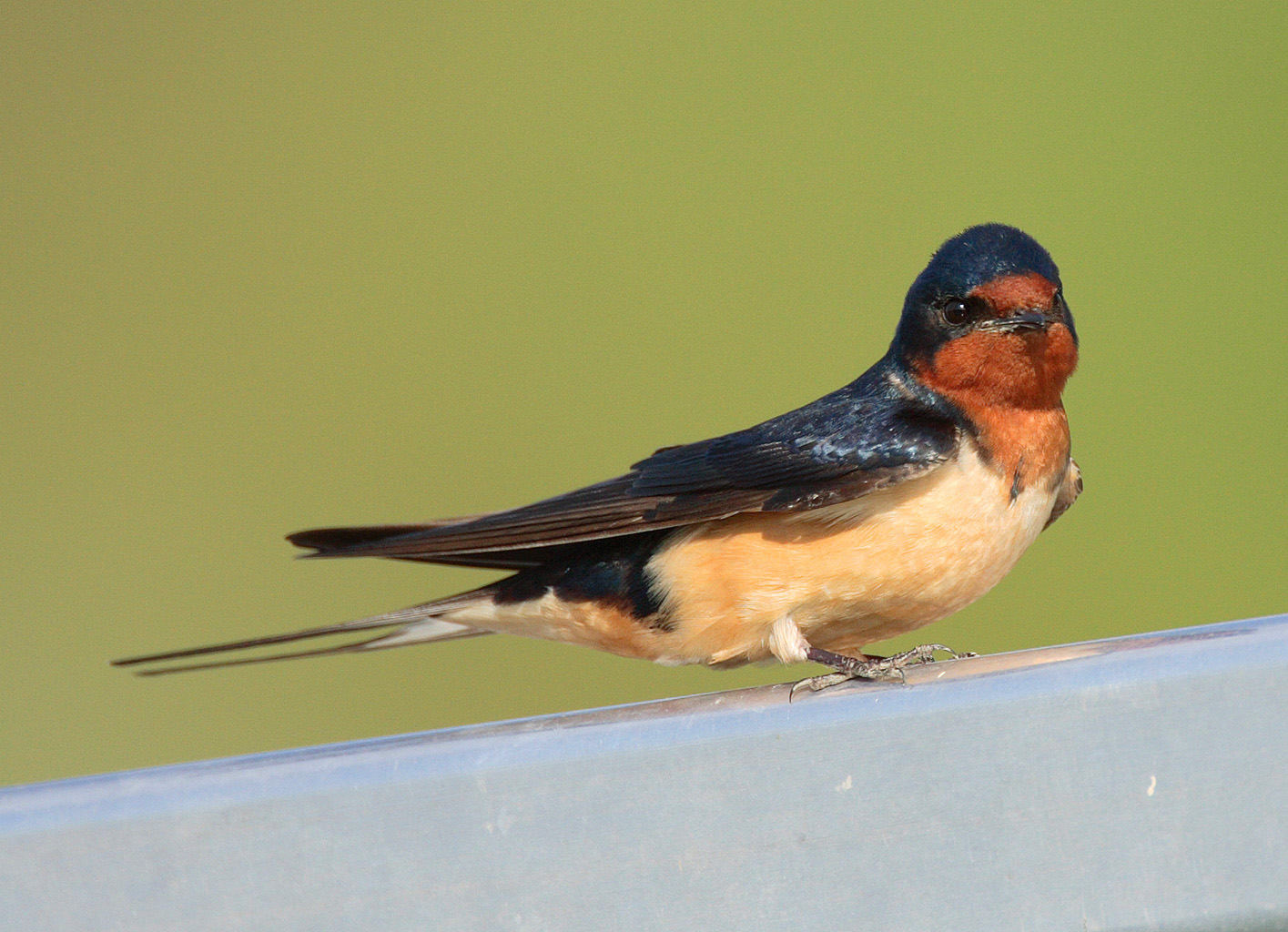
Barn swallow

Order: Passeriformes Family: Hirundinidae

The family Hirundinidae is adapted to aerial feeding. They have a slender streamlined body, long pointed wings, and a short bill with a wide gape. The feet are adapted to perching rather than walking, and the front toes are partly joined at the base.

- Bank swallow, Riparia riparia
- Tree swallow, Tachycineta bicolor
- Bahama swallow, Tachycineta cyaneovirdis (O)
- Northern rough-winged swallow, Stelgidopteryx serripennis
- Purple martin, Progne subis
- Barn swallow, Hirundo rustica (B?)
- Cliff swallow, Petrochelidon pyrrhonota
- Cave swallow, Petrochelidon fulva

== Kinglets ==
Order: Passeriformes Family: Regulidae

The kinglets are a small family of birds which resemble the titmice. They are very small insectivorous birds in the genus Regulus. The adults have colored crowns, giving rise to their name.

- Ruby-crowned kinglet, Corthylio calendula (R)

== Waxwings ==
Order: Passeriformes Family: Bombycillidae

The waxwings are a group of birds with soft silky plumage and unique red tips to some of the wing feathers. In the Bohemian and cedar waxwings, these tips look like sealing wax and give the group its name. These are arboreal birds of northern forests. They live on insects in summer and berries in winter.

- Cedar waxwing, Bombycilla cedrorum

== Gnatcatchers ==
Order: Passeriformes Family: Polioptilidae

The family Polioptilidae is a group of small insectivorous passerine birds containing the gnatcatchers and gnatwrens.

- Blue-gray gnatcatcher, Polioptila caerulea

== Wrens ==
Order: Passeriformes Family: Troglodytidae

Wrens are small and inconspicuous birds, except for their loud songs. They have short wings and thin down-turned bills. Several species often hold their tails upright. All are insectivorous.

- Northern house wren, Troglodytes aedon
- Sedge wren, Cistothorus platensis (O)

== Mockingbirds and thrashers ==
Order: Passeriformes Family: Mimidae

The mimids are a family of passerine birds which includes thrashers, mockingbirds, tremblers, and the New World catbirds. They are notable for their vocalization, especially their remarkable ability to mimic a wide variety of birds and other sounds heard outdoors. The species tend towards dull grays and browns in their appearance.

- Gray catbird, Dumetella carolinensis
- Brown thrasher, Toxostoma rufum (O)
- Bahama mockingbird, Mimus gundlachii (O)
- Northern mockingbird, Mimus polyglottos (B?)

== Starlings ==
Order: Passeriformes Family: Sturnidae

Starlings are small to medium-sized passerines with strong feet. Their flight is strong and direct and they are very gregarious. Their preferred habitat is open country, and they eat insects and fruit. Their plumage is typically dark with a metallic sheen.

- European starling, Sturnus vulgaris (I) (O)

== Thrushes and allies ==
Order: Passeriformes Family: Turdidae

The thrushes are a group of passerine birds that occur mainly but not exclusively in the Old World. They are plump, soft plumaged, small to medium-sized insectivores or sometimes omnivores, often feeding on the ground. Many have attractive songs.

- Eastern bluebird, Sialia sialis (O)
- Veery, Catharus fuscescens
- Gray-cheeked thrush, Catharus minimus
- Swainson's thrush, Catharus ustulatus
- Hermit thrush, Catharus guttatus (R)
- Wood thrush, Hylocichla mustelina
- American robin, Turdus migratorius (O)

== Old World sparrows ==
Order: Passeriformes Family: Passeridae

Old World sparrows are small passerine birds. In general, sparrows tend to be small plump brownish or grayish birds with short tails and short powerful beaks. Sparrows are seed eaters, but they also consume small insects.

- House sparrow, Passer domesticus (I)

== Wagtails and pipits ==
Order: Passeriformes Family: Motacillidae

Motacillidae is a family of small passerine birds with medium to long tails. They include the wagtails, longclaws, and pipits. They are slender, ground-feeding insectivores of open country.

- American pipit, Anthus rubescens (O)

== Finches, euphonias, and allies ==
Order: Passeriformes Family: Fringillidae

Finches are seed-eating passerines. They are small to moderately large and have strong, usually conical and sometimes very large, beaks. All have twelve tail feathers and nine primaries. They have a bouncing flight with alternating bouts of flapping and gliding on closed wings, and most sing well.

- American goldfinch, Spinus tristis (O)

== New World sparrows ==
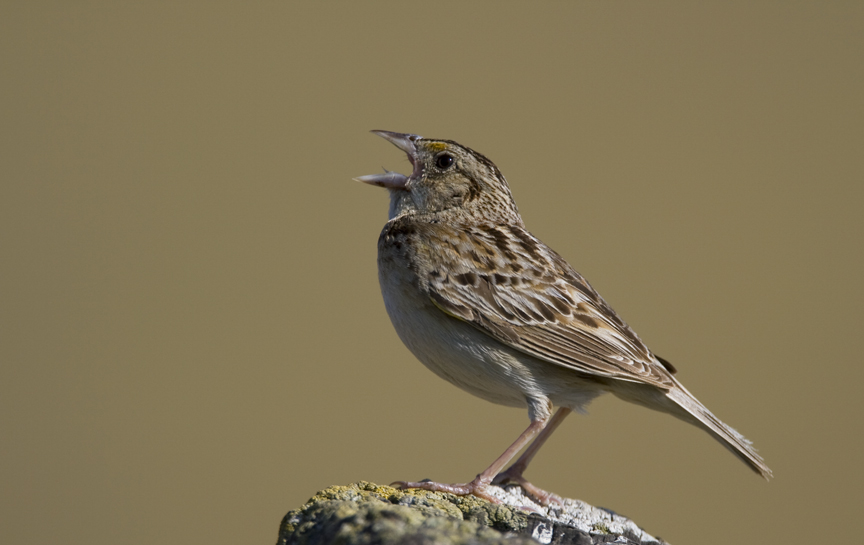
Grasshopper sparrow

Order: Passeriformes Family: Passerellidae

Until 2017, these species were considered part of the family Emberizidae. Most of the species are known as sparrows, but these birds are not closely related to the Old World sparrows which are in the family Passeridae. Many of these have distinctive head patterns.

- Grasshopper sparrow, Ammodramus savannarum
- Lark sparrow, Chondestes grammacus (O)
- Chipping sparrow, Spizella passerina (O)
- Clay-colored sparrow, Spizella pallida (O)
- Field sparrow, Spizella pusilla (O)
- Fox sparrow, Passerella iliaca (O)
- Dark-eyed junco, Junco hyemalis (O)
- White-crowned sparrow, Zonotrichia leucophrys (O)
- White-throated sparrow, Zonotrichia albicollis (O)
- Vesper sparrow, Pooecetes gramineus (O)
- Seaside sparrow, Ammospiza maritima (O)
- Savannah sparrow, Passerculus sandwichensis
- Song sparrow, Melospiza melodia (O)
- Lincoln's sparrow, Melospiza lincolnii (R)
- Swamp sparrow, Melospiza georgiana (O)
- Eastern towhee, Pipilo erythrophthalmus (O)

== Spindalises ==
Order: Passeriformes Family: Phaenicophilidae

The members of this family are native to the Greater Antilles. One species occurs fairly frequently in Florida.

- Western spindalis, Spindalis zena (O)

== Yellow-breasted chat ==
Order: Passeriformes Family: Icteriidae

This species was historically placed in the wood-warblers (Parulidae) but nonetheless most authorities were unsure if it belonged there. It was placed in its own family in 2017.

- Yellow-breasted chat, Icteria vireos (O)

== Troupials and allies ==
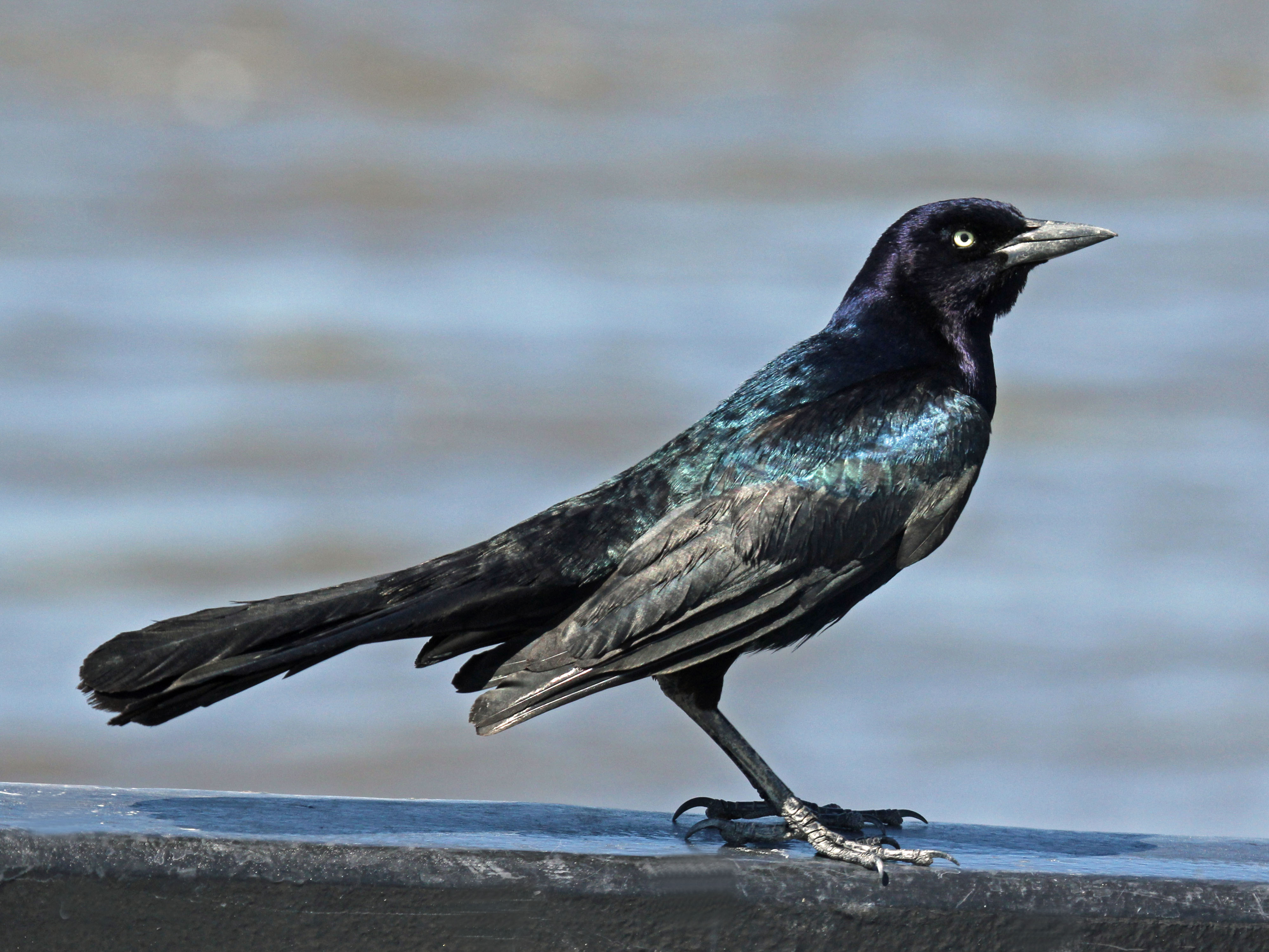
Boat-tailed grackle

Order: Passeriformes Family: Icteridae

The icterids are a group of small to medium-sized, often colorful, passerines restricted to the New World, including the grackles, New World blackbirds and New World orioles. Most have black as a predominant plumage color, often enlivened by yellow, orange or red.

- Yellow-headed blackbird, Xanthocephalus xanthocephalus (O)
- Bobolink, Dolichonyx oryzivorus
- Eastern meadowlark, Sturnella magna (O)
- Orchard oriole, Icterus spurius
- Baltimore oriole, Icterus galbula
- Red-winged blackbird, Agelaius phoeniceus (R)
- Tawny-shouldered blackbird, Agelaius umeralis (O)
- Shiny cowbird, Molothrus bonariensis (O)
- Brown-headed cowbird, Molothrus ater (O)
- Common grackle, Quiscalus quiscula (O)

== New World warblers ==
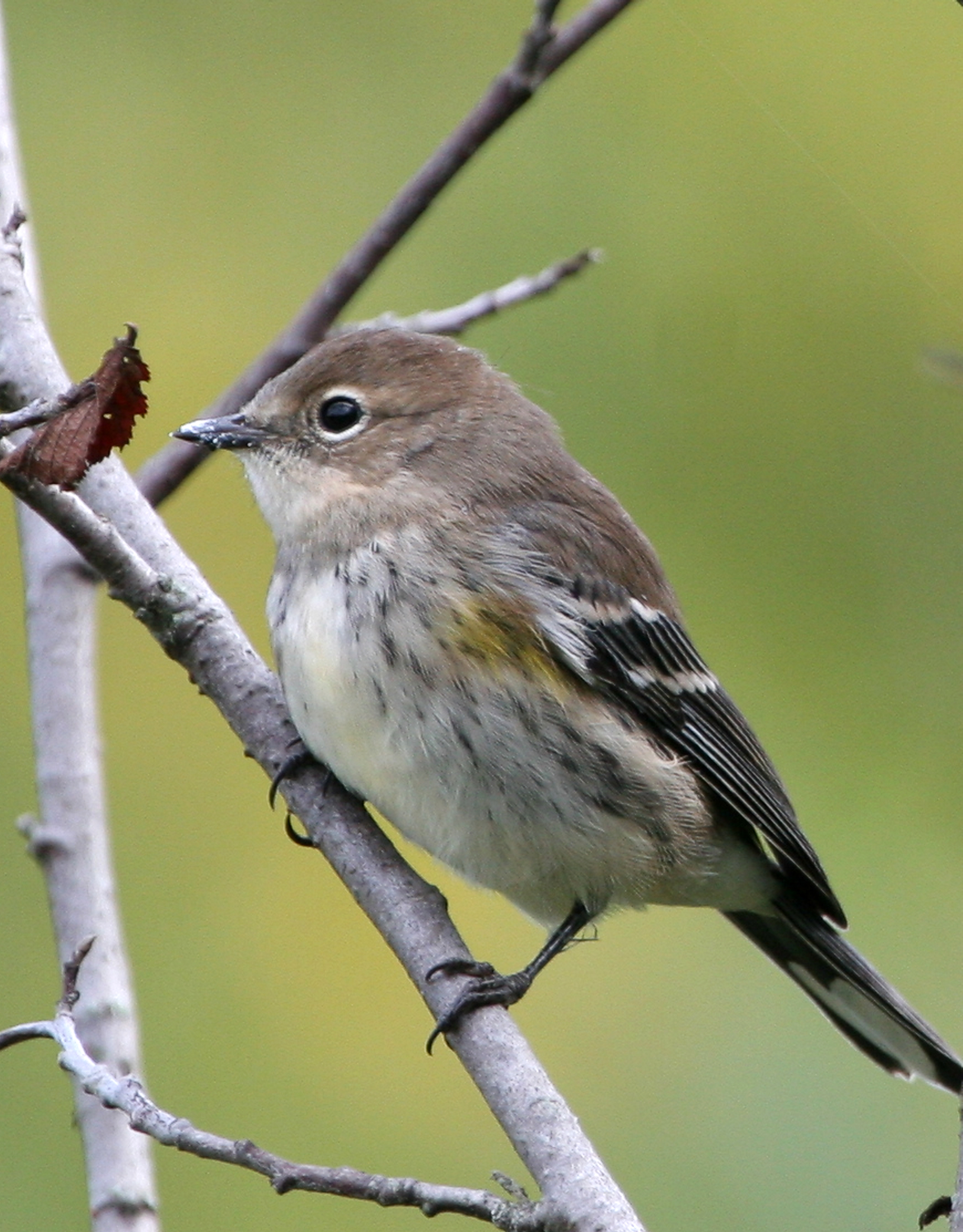
Yellow-rumped warbler

Order: Passeriformes Family: Parulidae

The wood warblers are a group of small, often colorful, passerines restricted to the New World. Most are arboreal, but some are terrestrial. Most members of this family are insectivores.

- Ovenbird, Seiurus aurocapilla
- Worm-eating warbler, Helmitheros vermivorum
- Louisiana waterthrush, Parkesia motacilla
- Northern waterthrush, Parkesia noveboracensis
- Bachman's warbler, Vermivora bachmanii (E) (O)
- Golden-winged warbler, Vermivora chrysoptera
- Blue-winged warbler, Vermivora cyanoptera
- Black-and-white warbler, Mniotilta varia
- Prothonotary warbler, Protonotaria citrea
- Swainson's warbler, Limnothlypis swainsonii (R)
- Tennessee warbler, Leiothlypis peregrina
- Orange-crowned warbler, Leiothlypis celata (O)
- Nashville warbler, Leiothlypis ruficapilla
- Connecticut warbler, Oporornis agilis
- Mourning warbler, Geothlypis philadelphia (O)
- Kentucky warbler, Geothlypis formosa
- Common yellowthroat, Geothlypis trichas
- Hooded warbler, Setophaga citrina
- American redstart, Setophaga ruticilla
- Cape May warbler, Setophaga tigrina
- Cerulean warbler, Setophaga cerulea
- Northern parula, Setophaga americana
- Magnolia warbler, Setophaga magnolia
- Bay-breasted warbler, Setophaga castanea
- Blackburnian warbler, Setophaga fusca
- Yellow warbler, Setophaga petechia
- Chestnut-sided warbler, Setophaga pensylvanica
- Blackpoll warbler, Setophaga striata
- Black-throated blue warbler, Setophaga caerulescens
- Palm warbler, Setophaga palmarum
- Pine warbler, Setophaga pinus (O)
- Yellow-rumped warbler, Setophaga coronata
- Yellow-throated warbler, Setophaga dominica
- Prairie warbler, Setophaga discolor
- Black-throated gray warbler, Setophaga nigrescens (O)
- Townsend's warbler, Setophaga townsendi (O)
- Black-throated green warbler, Setophaga virens
- Canada warbler, Cardellina canadensis (R)
- Wilson's warbler, Cardellina pusilla (R)

== Cardinals and allies ==
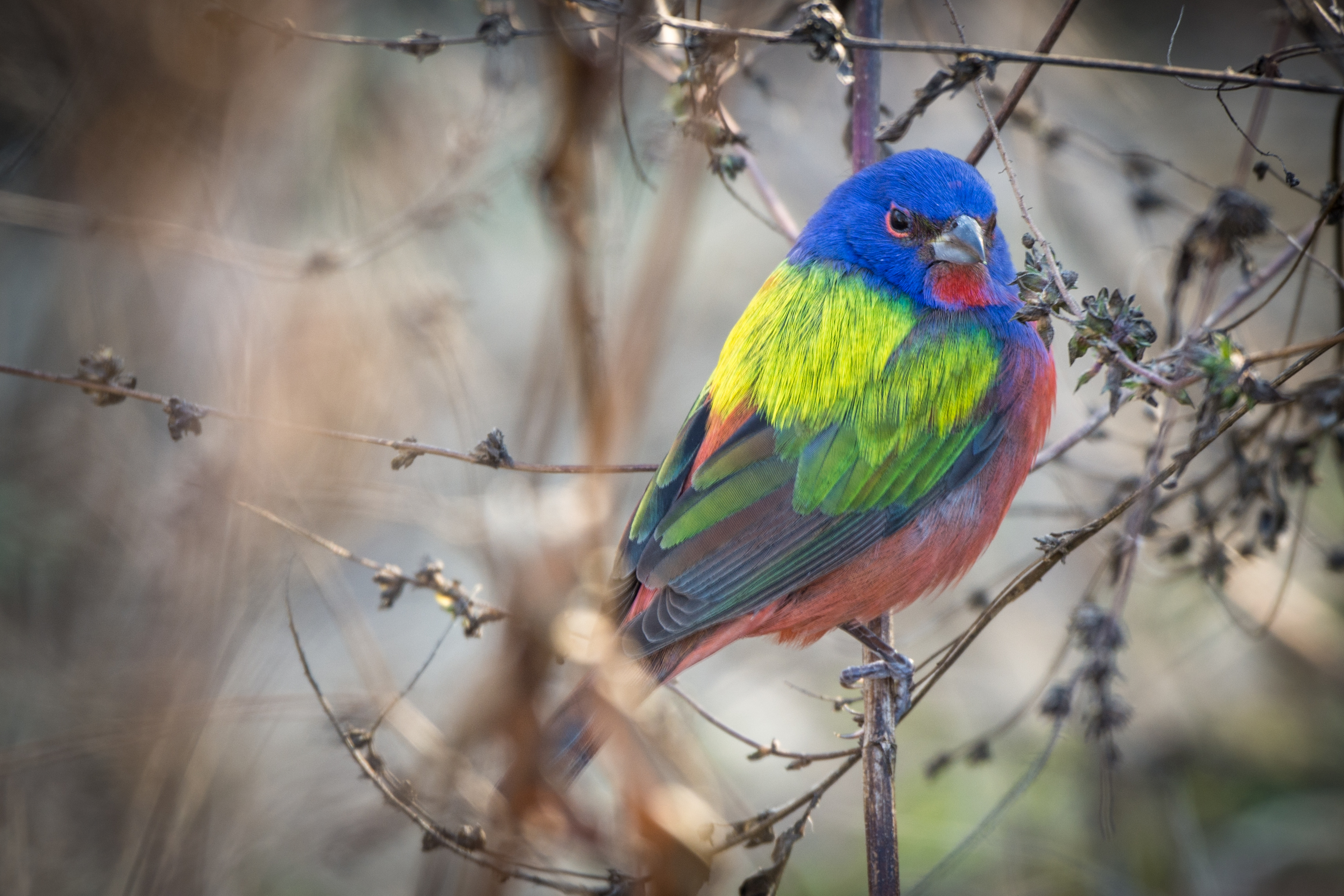
Painted bunting

Order: Passeriformes Family: Cardinalidae

The cardinals are a family of robust, seed-eating birds with strong bills. They are typically associated with open woodland. The sexes usually have distinct plumages.

- Summer tanager, Piranga rubra
- Scarlet tanager, Piranga olivacea
- Western tanager, Piranga ludoviciana (O)
- Northern cardinal, Cardinalis cardinalis (O)
- Rose-breasted grosbeak, Pheucticus ludovicianus
- Blue grosbeak, Passerina caerulea
- Indigo bunting, Passerina cyanea
- Painted bunting, Passerina ciris
- Dickcissel, Spiza americana

== Tanagers and allies ==
Order: Passeriformes Family: Thraupidae

The tanagers are a large group of small to medium-sized passerine birds restricted to the New World, mainly in the tropics. Many species are brightly colored. As a family they are omnivorous, but individual species specialize in eating fruits, seeds, insects, or other types of food. Most have short, rounded wings.

- Bananaquit, Coereba flaveola (O)
- Yellow-faced grassquit, Tiaris olivaceus (O)

== See also ==
- List of birds of the United States
- List of birds of Florida
- List of birds of Everglades National Park
