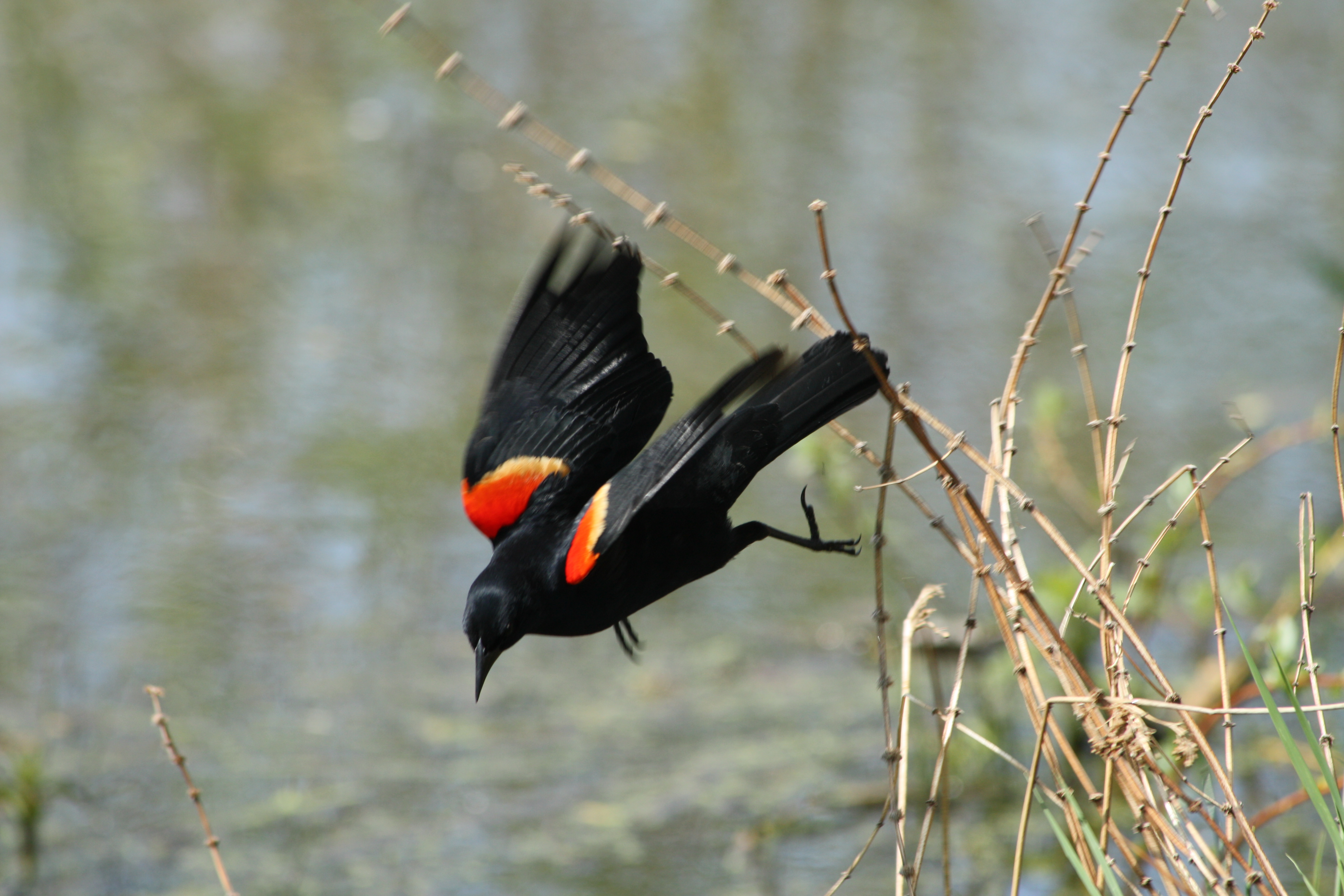
- A male red-winged blackbird (Agelaius phoeniceus) while flying

Scientific classification
- Kingdom: Animalia
- Phylum: Chordata
- Class: Aves
- Order: Passeriformes
- Family: Icteridae
- Genus: Agelaius; Vieillot, 1816

Type species
- Oriolus phoeniceus Linnaeus, 1766

Species
- See text

= Agelaius =

Genus of birds

Agelaius is a genus of blackbirds in the New World family Icteridae. Established by Louis Pierre Vieillot in 1816, it contains five species:

| Image | Scientific name | Common name | Distribution |
|---|---|---|---|
| | Agelaius phoeniceus | Red-winged blackbird | North and much of Central America |
| | Agelaius assimilis | Red-shouldered blackbird | Cuba |
| | Agelaius tricolor | Tricolored blackbird | Pacific coast of North America, from Northern California in the U.S. (with occasional strays into Oregon), to upper Baja California in Mexico. |
| | Agelaius humeralis | Tawny-shouldered blackbird | Cuba, Hispaniola, and the Cayman Islands |
| | Agelaius xanthomus | Yellow-shouldered blackbird | Puerto Rico |

The name Agelaius comes from the Greek agelaios, meaning "gregarious".
