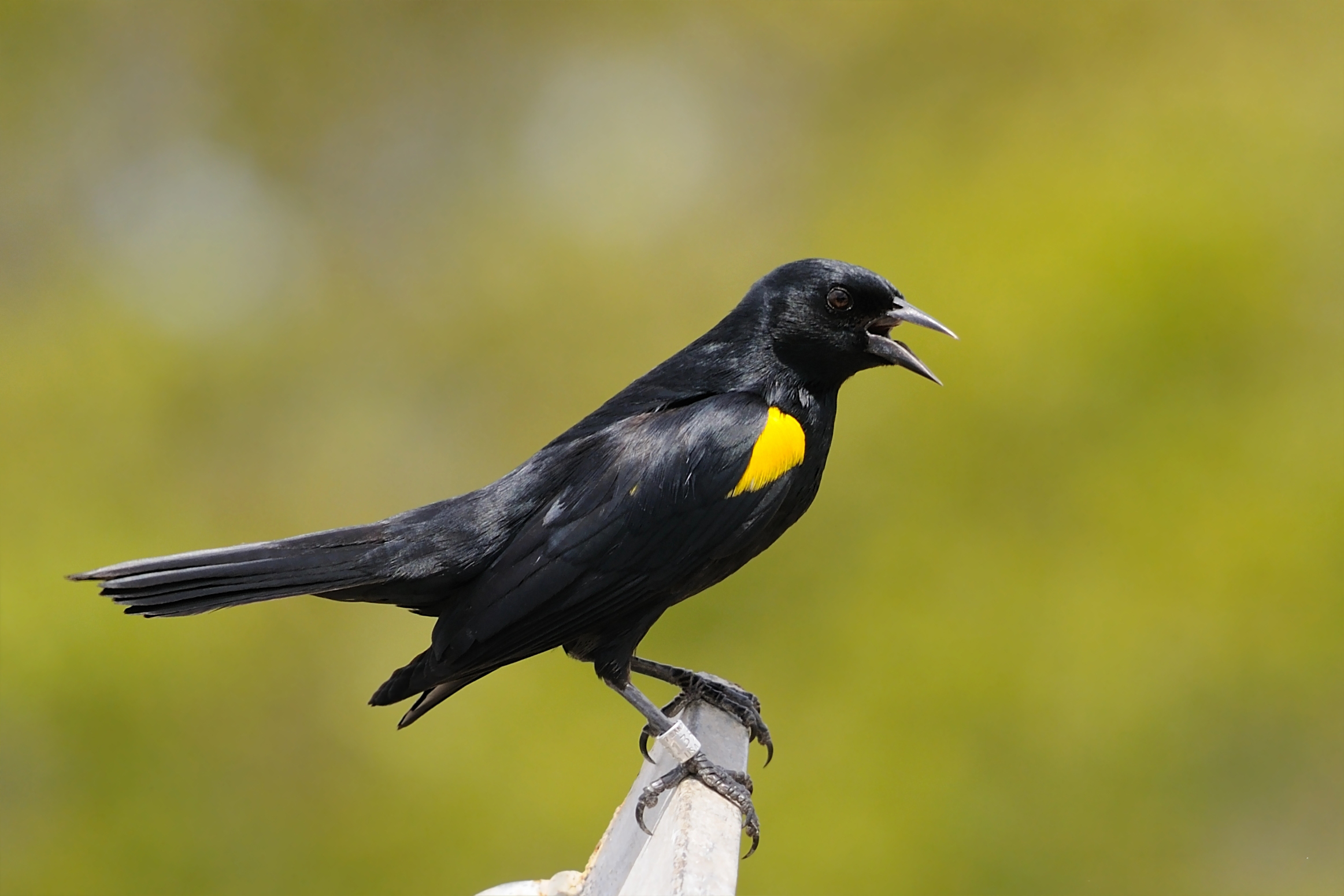

Conservation status
- Endangered (IUCN 3.1)

Scientific classification
- Kingdom: Animalia
- Phylum: Chordata
- Class: Aves
- Order: Passeriformes
- Family: Icteridae
- Genus: Agelaius
- Species: A. xanthomus

Binomial name
- Agelaius xanthomus (P.L. Sclater, 1862)

Subspecies
- A. x. monensis Barnes Jr, 1945; A. x. xanthomus

Synonyms
- Icterus xanthomus

= Yellow-shouldered blackbird =

Species of bird

The yellow-shouldered blackbird (Agelaius xanthomus), known in Puerto Rican Spanish as mariquita de Puerto Rico or capitán, is a species of blackbird endemic to Puerto Rico. It has black plumage with a prominent yellow patch on the wing. Adult males and females are of similar appearance. The species is predominantly insectivorous.

== Taxonomy ==
The nominate form of the yellow-shouldered blackbird (A. x. xanthomus) was first described from Puerto Rico and Vieques in 1862 by Philip Sclater as Icterus xanthomus. The recognized subspecies A. x. monensis, or Mona yellow-shouldered blackbird, was described by Barnes in 1945 from the islands of Mona and Monito.

The species is closely related to, and possibly derived from, the red-winged blackbird (Agelaius phoeniceus). The tawny-shouldered blackbird (Agelaius humeralis), a species from Cuba and Hispaniola, is morphologically intermediate between A. xanthomus and A. phoeniceus. Until recently, some authors considered A. xanthomus as a subspecies of A. humeralis. The 1983 American Ornithologists' Union edition considered A. xanthomus, together with A. humeralis, a superspecies. The main physical difference between A. xanthomus and A. humeralis resides in their bills, with that of A. humeralis being broader toward the base.

== Description ==
The yellow-shouldered blackbird, as its name implies, is a glossy black bird with a small yellow humeral patch around its "shoulders" outlined by a white margin. Immature individuals possess a duller coloration and a brown abdomen. Although plumage coloration is indistinguishable between the sexes, sexual dimorphism is present in this species with males being larger than females. Plumage abnormality is rare in this species. Adult individuals measure from 20–23 cm (7.9–9.1 in); on average, males weigh 41 g (1.4 oz) and females weigh 35 g (1.2 oz). Sexual categorization may also be made by measurement of the wings, with males' being 1.1 times larger and having a mean length of 102 cm (40 in), while females' wings have an average length of 93.3 cm (36.7 in).

== Conservation and habitat ==
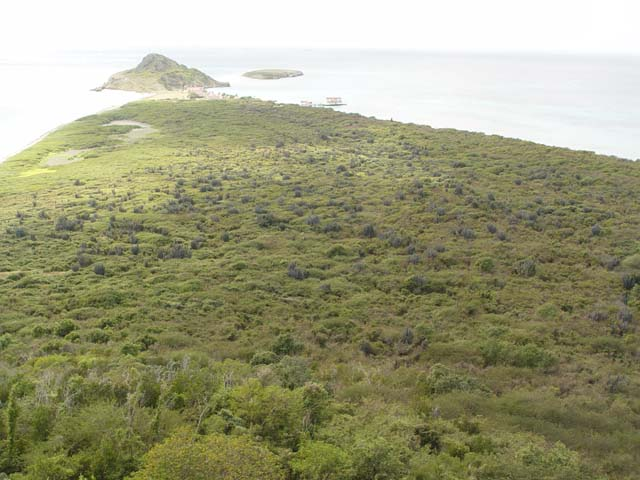
Puerto Rican dry forest in the island of Caja de Muertos off the southern coast of Puerto Rico, habitat of the yellow-shouldered blackbird.

The species was once commonly found in the coastal forests of the archipelago of Puerto Rico, but during the early 20th century, these forests were cut down to allow for the development of sugarcane plantations. After the decline of the sugar industry after the 1930s the coastal areas were developed for housing. As a result, the species is now limited to three areas: the islands of Mona and Monito, where a subspecies developed (A. g. xmonensis); the Roosevelt Roads Naval Station area in eastern Puerto Rico; and the southern Puerto Rican dry forests and mangroves. Although all three locations are considered coastal subtropical dry forests, the species has been observed as far inland as the mountain town of Lares and in subtropical wet forests during the non-breeding season. The species has also been observed at the Cabo Rojo National Wildlife Refuge. The destruction of habitat and brood parasitism by the shiny cowbird (Molothrus bonariensis) led to a drastic population decline from the mid-1970s to early 1980s. In 1976, the population of the nominate form was estimated at 2000 individuals, but in 1982, the population estimate dropped to 300 individuals. Conservation efforts have increased the population to 1250 pairs.

In 1976 Post and Wiley estimated the Mona subspecies population at 200 individuals. Subsequent roost counts and studies from 1981 to 1995 estimated the population at anywhere between 220 and 400 individuals. Studies performed in the island of Monito, located 5 km (3.1 mi) northwest of Mona, revealed an average of 25 individuals with breeding being observed. The studies also revealed that birds traveled from the west coast of Mona to Monito.

Yellow-shouldered blackbirds are non-migratory birds, but a portion of the population of the nominate form moves from coastal areas to inland areas during the non-breeding season to feed.

== Diet ==
Yellow-shouldered blackbirds are omnivorous, but are considered to be arboreal insectivores since the majority of their diet consists of insects. William Post performed studies to determine the dietary habits of the nominate form A. x. xanthomus. The studies analyzed samples of food parents brought to nestlings, and found evidence of consumption of insects belonging to the orders Lepidoptera, Orthoptera, Hemiptera, Coleoptera, Diptera, Dermaptera and Hymenoptera, arachnid material of the order Araneae, unidentified molluscs, and plant matter. Aside from natural material, the species also consumes processed food such as cattle ration, human food (cooked rice and sugar), dog food and monkey chow. Plant matter was acquired from processed foods while insects are gleaned from the canopy and sub-canopy layers of trees. During the nesting season their diet is composed of 90% arthropod material.

Studies have not been performed to determine the dietary habits of the Mona subspecies, but consumption of insects, spiders, fruits from Pithecellobium species and the cacti Selenicereus species, Pilosocereus armatus (as P. royenii), Harrisia portoricensis, and Opuntia species, seeds from gumbo limbo (Bursera simaruba) and Ficus species and nectar from Aloe vera, yucca and Croton discolor have been observed.

== Reproduction and behavior ==
The yellow-shouldered blackbird breeding season commonly spans from April to August but breeding activity has been observed from February to November. The breeding season's start coincides with the start of the rainy season, thus explaining the fluctuation in the start and end of the breeding season. The species is believed to be monogamous with a single attempt at nesting per year and with nesting being performed in loose colonies. Nests of both the nominate form and the Mona subspecies contain from one to four eggs with an average of three. Eggs are blue-green with brown spots and are incubated for 13 days by the female. Both sexes reach sexual maturity at one year of age. As with other Agelaius species, it usually builds open, cup-shaped nests in trees, but nest locations and shapes may vary depending on location and availability of building materials. The Roosevelt Roads' population builds nests on hollows in dead mangroves, while the Mona subspecies builds nests in ledges or crevices near the coastal cliffs. In all, the species uses eight distinct nesting habitats: mudflats and salinas; offshore red mangrove cays; black mangrove forest; lowland pastures (dry coastal forest); suburban areas; coconut plantations; and coastal cliffs. Building of the nest is performed solely by females while feeding of the young is performed by both sexes. Nestlings leave the nest 13 to 16 days after hatching. Males defend small territories, usually around 3 metres, during the nesting period. Before the nesting period males defend slightly larger territories to repel other males.

Yellow-shouldered blackbirds engage in anting, a rare behavior only observed in the Puerto Rican tanager among West Indian birds. Individuals were observed applying Pheidole species ants to their body and feathers for a short period of time (8 minutes).

The species engages in mobbing, a behavior in which a pack of birds, from one or more species, attack a known predator (usually to defend eggs or hatchlings).

== Threats and conservation efforts ==
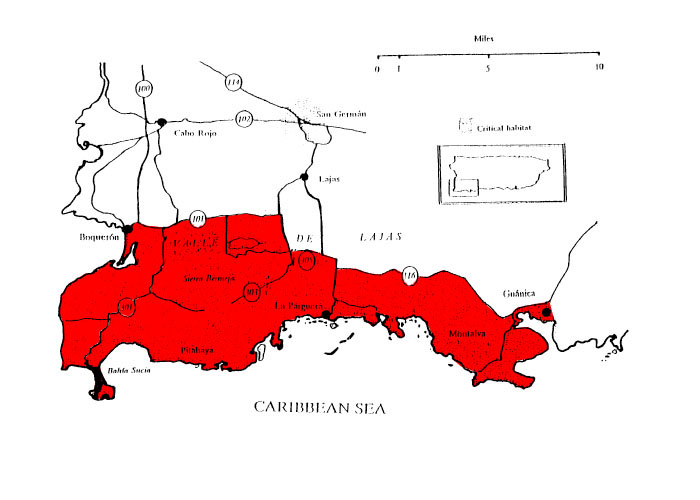
Critical habitat in southwest Puerto Rico for the yellow-shouldered blackbird

The yellow-shouldered blackbird was listed as an endangered species on November 19, 1976, by the U.S. Fish and Wildlife Service. Critical habitat was subsequently established for the entire Mona and Monito islands, the Roosevelt Roads Naval Station in Ceiba, an area expanding from Cabo Rojo to Guánica in the southwest region of Puerto Rico, and a small area in San Germán.

Diseases such as avian pox have been associated with extinction of bird populations such as Hawaiian honeycreepers. For this species only one type of parasite has been observed, the chewing louse (formerly classified as Mallophaga), with three species being observed: Philopterus agelaii; Machaerilaemus species; and Myrsidea species. The parasites predominantly occur in the head area with adult males having the highest infestation percentage and juveniles having a lower infestation rate than adults. The mites Ornithonyssus bursa and Androlaelaps casalis have also been observed in nests, but the information presently available does not indicate they are a threat. Another disease commonly experienced by yellow-shouldered blackbirds is fowlpox, also known as avian pox. Lesions caused by this disease occur in exposed areas such as the legs and the bend of the wings.

Nest predation has been an important contributor to the decline of the yellow-shouldered blackbird. Known terrestrial predators include rats (Rattus rattus), mongooses and feral cats, all introduced species to Puerto Rico. Rats constituted the main nest predator eating both eggs and hatchlings. A 1983 report concluded that rat predation accounted for 48% of nest failures that year. The majority of the activity coincided with the recession of water from July to August which exposed the mangrove nesting area to dry land. Since the middle 1980s artificial PVC nesting structures have been created in mudflats surrounding mangrove forests to reduce rat predation. These structures replaced old wooden nesting boxes and were readily accepted by the species. Presently, few (one or two) natural nests are observed each year in the area.

The loss of feeding and breeding habitat and brood parasitism by the shiny cowbird are among other threats that limit and endanger the yellow-shouldered blackbird populations. Natural predators, such as the pearly-eyed thrasher (Margarops fuscatus), also represent a threat, although minor, to the populations. These animals have been reported to steal eggs and young from nests and to also destroy or steal nesting materials which in many cases leaves the young as prey for the predators.

== See also ==
- Fauna of Puerto Rico
- List of birds of Puerto Rico
- List of endemic fauna of Puerto Rico
- List of Puerto Rican birds
- List of Vieques birds
- El Toro Wilderness
