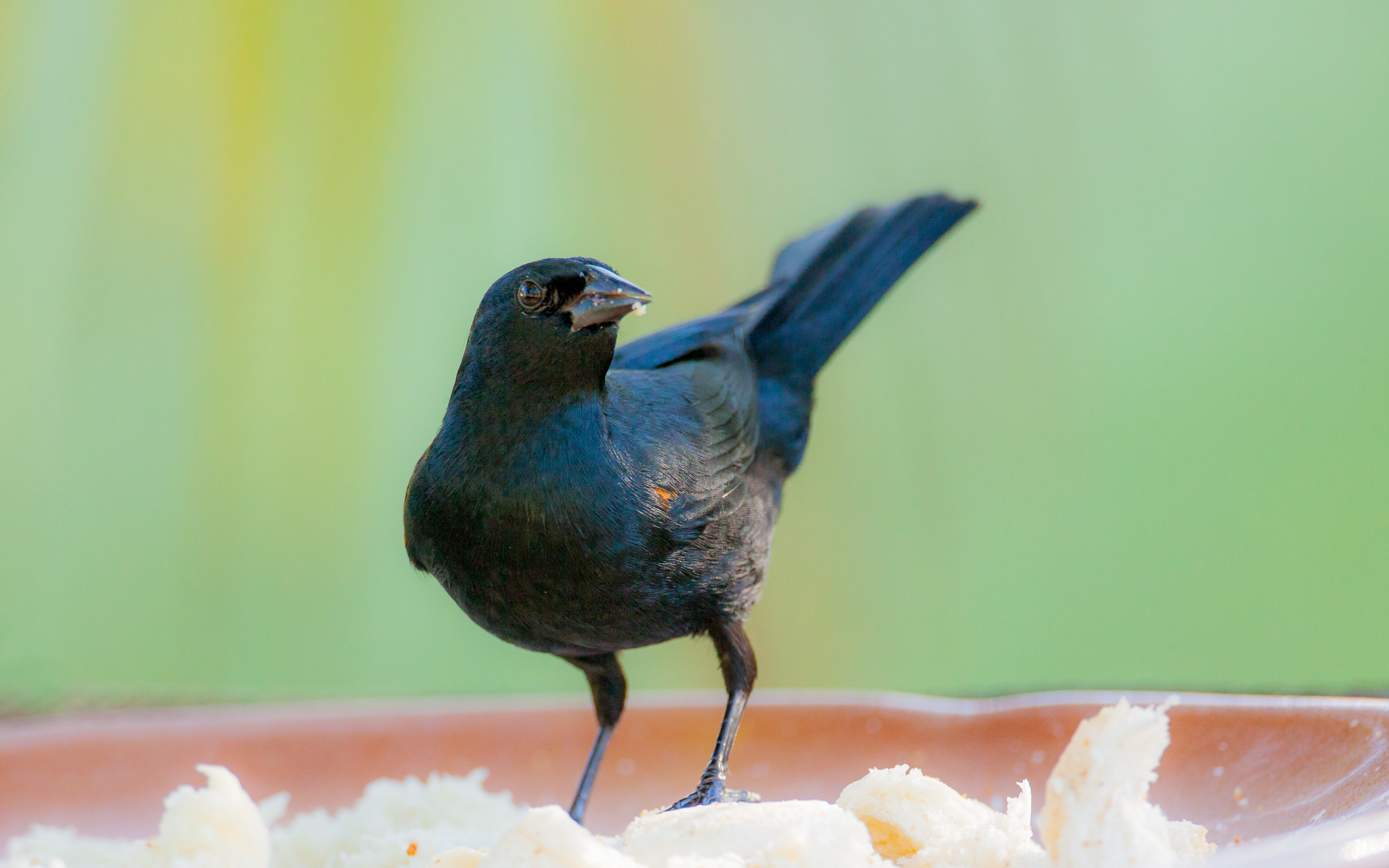

Conservation status
- Least Concern (IUCN 3.1)

Scientific classification
- Kingdom: Animalia
- Phylum: Chordata
- Class: Aves
- Order: Passeriformes
- Family: Icteridae
- Genus: Agelaius
- Species: A. humeralis

Binomial name
- Agelaius humeralis (Vigors, 1827)
- Range of A. humeralis

= Tawny-shouldered blackbird =

Species of bird

The tawny-shouldered blackbird (Agelaius humeralis) is a species of bird in the family Icteridae, the oropendolas, New World orioles, and New World blackbirds. It is found in Cuba and Haiti and possibly the Dominican Republic. It is also a vagrant to the Florida Keys in the United States.

== Taxonomy and systematics ==
The tawny-shouldered blackbird was formally described in 1827 with the binomial Leistes humeralis. It and the yellow-shouldered blackbird (A. xanthomus) are sister species and form a superspecies. It is known in Cuba as "mayito" and in Haiti as "ti kawouj".

The tawny-shouldered blackbird has two subspecies, the nominate A. h. humeralis (Vigors, 1827) and A. h. scopulus (Garrido, 1970).

== Description ==
The tawny-shouldered blackbird is 19 to 22 cm (7.5 to 8.7 in) long. Males weigh an average of 38.3 g (1.4 oz) and females an average of 34.5 g (1.2 oz). Adult males of the nominate subspecies are mostly black with a slight bluish gloss. Their lesser and median upperwing coverts are tawny and the median coverts have yellowish cream tips. Adult females are duskier than males and lack the bluish gloss. They have a smaller amount of tawny on the coverts and the median coverts are partly black. Both sexes have a dark brown iris, a black bill, and black legs and feet. Juveniles are dusky black with minimal or no tawny on their wing. Subspecies A. h. scopulus is smaller than the nominate with a smaller tawny patch and a thinner bill.

== Distribution and habitat ==
According to most sources the nominate subspecies of the tawny-shouldered blackbird is found throughout mainland Cuba, on some small Cuban islands, and in Haiti. The IUCN's text places it also in the Dominican Republic but does not include that country in its map. The sources place subspecies A. h. scopulus on Cayo Cantiles, a small Cuban island east of Isla de la Juventud ("Isle of Pines"). The species has also been recorded in the Florida Keys and at least once in mainland Florida.

The tawny-shouldered blackbird inhabits a variety of open habitats including woodlands and their edges, rice fields and other agricultural areas, swampy areas, and scrublands. In elevation it ranges from sea level to 900 m (3,000 ft).

== Behavior ==
=== Movement ===
The tawny-shouldered blackbird is not migratory though some small local movements have been observed.

=== Feeding ===
The tawny-shouldered blackbird feeds mostly on insects, other arthropods, small lizards, and seeds, and also includes fruit and nectar in its diet. It forages in trees, lower vegetation, and on the ground. It forms large flocks and that often include other icterids.

=== Breeding ===
The tawny-shouldered blackbird breeds between April and August in Cuba; its season in Haiti has not been defined. It usually breeds solitarily but sometimes in small loose colonies, and a large tree may have several nests. The nest is a cup built by the female from dry grass, moss, twigs, hair, and feathers. It is usually placed in a tree or palm and often near water. Nests have also been found in low marsh vegetation and once on an outdoor lamp. The clutch is three to four eggs that are bluish to greenish with brown spots. Females incubate the clutch and both parents provision nestlings. The incubation period and time to fledging are not known. The shiny cowbird (Molothrus bonariensis) is believed to parasitize its nests.

=== Vocalization ===
Both sexes of the tawny-shouldered blackbird sing, "1–2 protracted buzzing notes, sometimes introduced with [a] shorter buzz at higher pitch", and pairs sometimes duet. Their calls include "chuk or cheek" and "nasal and metallic notes".

== Status ==
The IUCN has assessed the tawny-shouldered blackbird as being of Least Concern. It has a large range;l its population size is not known but is believed to be stable. No immediate threats have been identified. It is considered common in Cuba and "uncommon and local" in Haiti. It "[a]dapts well to man-modified environments".

== See also ==
- Red-shouldered blackbird (mayito de la ciénaga)
