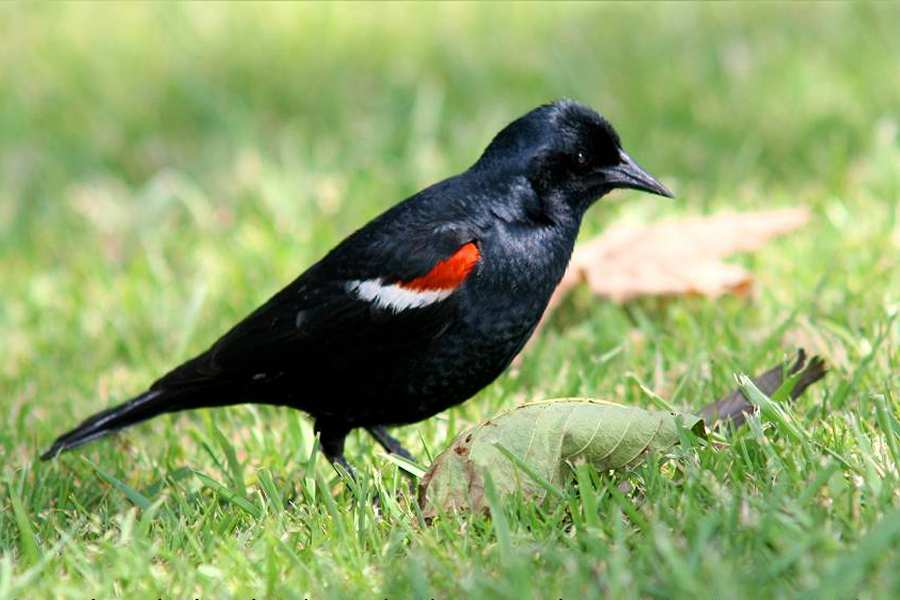
- A male tricolored blackbird in California, United States

Conservation status
- Endangered (IUCN 3.1)

Scientific classification
- Kingdom: Animalia
- Phylum: Chordata
- Class: Aves
- Order: Passeriformes
- Family: Icteridae
- Genus: Agelaius
- Species: A. tricolor

Binomial name
- Agelaius tricolor (Audubon, 1837)
- range of Tricolored blackbird

= Tricolored blackbird =

Species of bird

The tricolored blackbird (Agelaius tricolor) is a passerine bird of the family Icteridae. Its range is limited to the coastal areas of the Pacific coast of North America, from Northern California in the U.S. (with occasional strays into Oregon), to upper Baja California in Mexico.

This highly social and gregarious bird forms the largest colonies of any North American landbird, with a single breeding colony often consisting of tens of thousands of birds.

The common name is taken from the male bird's distinctive white stripes underneath their red shoulder patches, or "epaulets", which are visible when the bird is flying or displaying.

Despite the similar names, this bird is not related to the Old World common blackbird, which is a thrush (Turdidae).

The species' call sounds slightly more nasal than that of the red-wing's - a nasal kip and a sharp check. The male's song is a garbled on-ke-kaaangh. The bird migrates south during the colder seasons to Mexico and back to northern California during the warmer seasons.

== Taxonomy ==
The tricolored blackbird does not have any officially recognized subspecies, although there is a population in southern California that may require genetic evaluation.

== Distribution ==
The tricolored blackbird nests in colonies, but scholars disagree on whether the costs outweigh the benefits of these breeding habits. Nonetheless, nesting in colonies makes the tricolor susceptible to environmental changes. Although the tricolor has been able to adapt to some of the landscape changes, habitat loss played a major role in the reduction of its population.

The tricolor originally could be found in the marshes of California, nesting in wetland cattails and bulrushes. Scholars have noted a reduction in freshwater marshes as breeding grounds for the tricolored blackbird. Largely, this is due to human activity, and it's estimated that between the 1930s and 1980s alone, over 95% of wetlands were disappeared. Also in this period, the observed tricolor population saw an 89% reduction, while the average colony size saw a 63% reduction. Altogether, the tricolor population dropped from several million to only a few hundred thousand during the twentieth century. Nevertheless, the tricolor was able to adapt in response to these severe landscape reductions. It began to use both native and non-native vegetation as well as agricultural fields as their breeding and foraging grounds.

In the 1930s, over 93% of the tricolor's colonies were nested in freshwater marshes, but by the early twenty-first century, only 35% of colonies could be found in wetlands. In 2008, over a fourth of colonies were using non-native vegetation to nest, most notably Himalayan blackberry brambles. Although population decline was a consequence of agricultural intensification over the twentieth century, the birds were able to use these environmental changes to their advantage. The 2008 tricolored blackbird census found that nearly half of the total population nested in colonies inside of the grain fields of dairy farms.

As the twentieth century progressed, the tricolor began to increase in concentration within certain colonies. Specifically, in 2000, 59% birds were housed in one of California's ten largest colonies, and this number increased to 81% by 2011. Mega-colonies of the tricolor have begun to form in the San Joaquin Valley's numerous agricultural fields. Although the tricolor population consistently decreased during the twentieth century and into the twenty-first century, the population nested in San Joaquin Valley grew exponentially during this time. The number of tricolors in California's San Joaquin Valley in 1994 was 230% of what it was in 1937. By 2008, over 86% of California's population were located here.

Conservation efforts by the National Audubon Society in collaboration with the U.S. Fish and Wildlife Service have seen an impact on population numbers. The California population of tricolors saw an increase in the 2017 state survey from previous years. Nonetheless, most of this population gain was within the San Joaquin Valley or in San Benito County. Other regions of California saw a reduction in population in the 2017 census, including Sacramento Valley, with observations down by about 33% from the prior census in 2014. There has been a steady decline of the tricolors observed in this region over the twentieth and twenty-first centuries, with a greater proportion of birds moving to the San Joaquin Valley. There has also been an overall population decline in Southern California as well, following the dairy industry's move out of Southern California in the 1980s, in favor of the San Joaquin Valley. The other California region that saw a population increase in 2017 was the Central Coast. Historically, the Central Coast and Central Valley housed millions of tricolors before the population decline associated with human agricultural activity. Still, the population increase seen in 2017—from 627 to 17,576 birds—likely was not due to a growing number of tricolors coming to the Central Coast. Instead, this drastic population increase likely was a result of better survey efforts. Three large new colonies were observed in 2017, two of which were in previously unknown or un-surveyed locations. Expanded knowledge of the tricolor's breeding habits led researchers to increase their survey efforts in locations they suspected housed bird colonies.

Although most regions of California either remained constant or saw a decrease in the tricolor population in 2017, there was an increase in the state overall. The 2017 census, however, did prove that human conservation efforts can be successful. In Southern California, the population remained relatively constant from 2014 to 2017, but the distribution in this region changed. Riverside County saw a significant increase in population, and 57% of the tricolors observed in Southern California were in one single colony. The San Jacinto Wildlife Area in Riverside County had been the site of successful conservation efforts to provide the tricolor with nesting and foraging habitats.

== Endangered status ==
In 1990 the Department of Fish and Game (DFG) of California, based on significant decline in population numbers documented in the 1980s, added the tricolored blackbird to the published list of "Bird Species of Special Concern". This classification is an "administrative designation intended to alert biologists, land managers and others to a species declining status and encourages them to provide additional management considerations". At this time the tricolored was added to the U.S. Fish and Wildlife Service (USFWS) list of Birds of Conservation Concern.

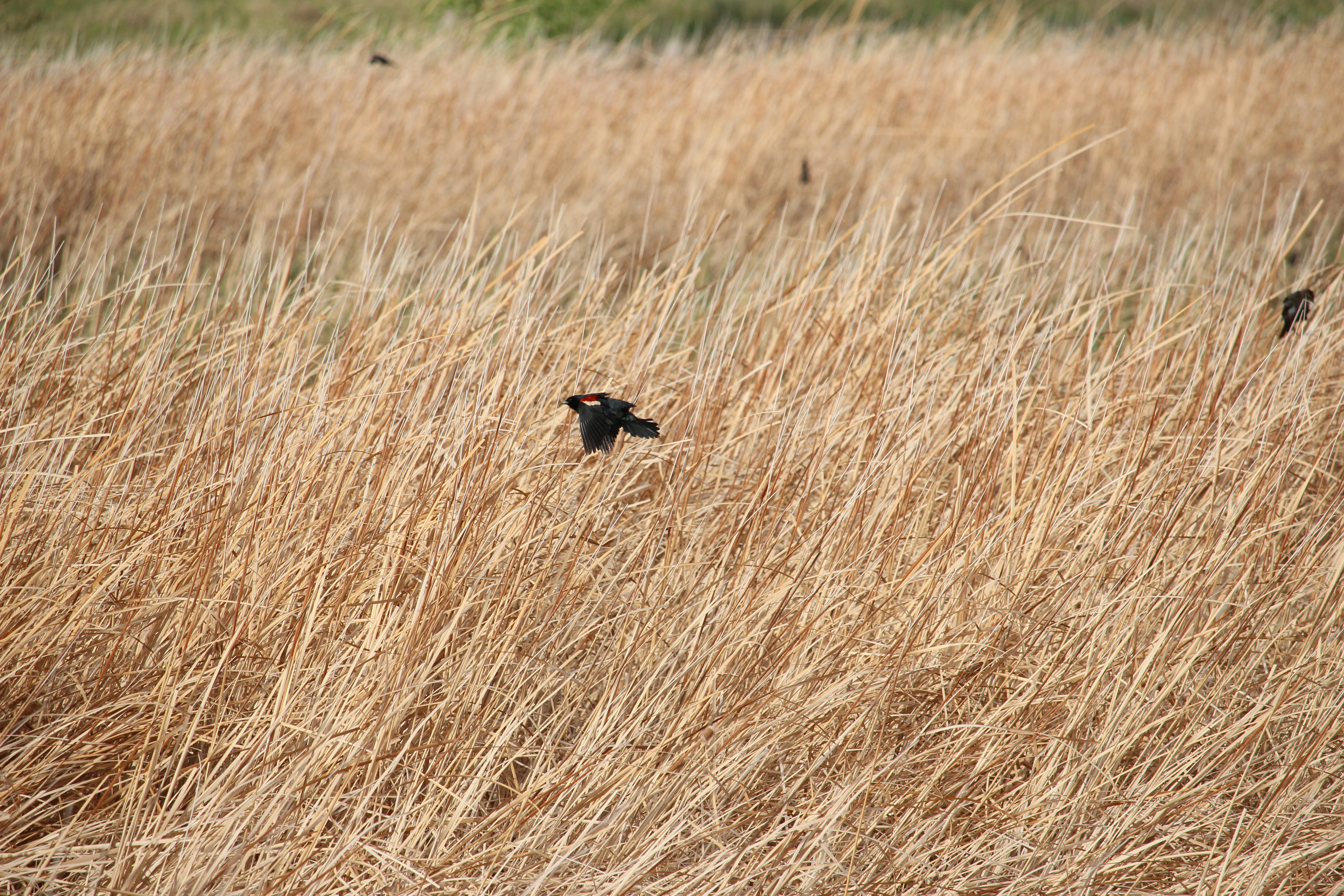
The tricolored blackbird breeds in large colonies such as this one in western Antelope Valley, California.

By 1991, the tricolor blackbird's breeding population had fallen to approximately thirty-five thousand adults. This prompted a petition submitted by the Yolo chapter of the National Audubon Society to the California Fish and Game Commission. The petition brought the tricolored blackbird under consideration for endangered classification. The classification was granted until the breeding season in 1992. It was then that researchers discovered a population exceeding three hundred thousand adults. A petition to withdraw the endangered classification was submitted and accepted. Conservation measures were supposed to be developed and implemented to avoid a future decline as seen before. These measures were developed, but only very limited progress was made in preventing the future decline of the tricolored blackbird. Interested groups started reconvening shortly after the year 2000. Managing groups found startling results when conducting population research.

In 2006 the tricolored blackbird was classified as Endangered by BirdLife International. Like the extinct passenger pigeon, the colonial nature of the tricolored blackbird makes it particularly vulnerable to extinction. Native grasslands once used for nesting and feeding have been lost to urban and agricultural development. Birds adapted to nesting in agricultural fields have been disturbed by harvesting during the breeding season when farmers would run harvesters through fields where thousands of nesting flightless chicks were killed within minutes. Once the tricolored blackbird was placed on the BirdLife Endangered Species list, it officially became a concern both regionally and nationally.

The U.S. Fish and Wildlife Service maintained the following "Primary conservation priorities for Tricolor habitat conservation and management" (The Tricolored Blackbird Working Group, 2007):

- Maintain, enhance, and protect existing habitat suitable for nesting, foraging, and wintering activities;
- Create and restore additional protected breeding habitats to support nesting and foraging;
- Identify mechanisms for protecting nesting and foraging habitats;
- To the extent allowable by law, survey private lands and identify largest and most vulnerable colonies;
- Encourage private landowners to protect active breeding colonies; and
- Encourage and enhance active breeding colonies on public lands.

In 2018, the tricolored blackbird was listed as a threatened species under the California Endangered Species Act, years after petitioning by the Center for Biological Diversity.

Beginning in 2015, Audubon California formalized a coalition operation with researchers, dairy groups, and governmental wildlife managers that identified colonies in grain fields, contacting farm owners, and paying them to delay their harvest, with the goal to leave the birds a safe haven until the chicks had fledged. With funding from the Natural Resources Conservation Service, the first year of the initiative protected 67,000 adult birds and their nests across 5 different nesting sites. By 2019, the number had grown to 158,000. In this time, the species was listed as threatened under the California Endangered Species Act, meaning that farmers could no longer harm them legally, even if they were not compensated for lost crops. However the program continued paying farmer owners to delay their harvests in order to maintain amicable relationships between all stakeholders.
